= Warnick =

Warnick is a surname. Notable people with the surname include:

- Angela Buchdahl (born 1972), née Warnick, American rabbi
- Judith Warnick (born 1950), American politician
- Karl Foster Warnick, American engineer
- Kim Warnick (born 1959), American rock musician
- Spencer K. Warnick (1874–1954), American politician
