= Senator McEwen =

Senator McEwen (or MacEwen or McEwan) may refer to:

- Anne McEwen (politician) (born 1954), Senate of Australia
- Drew MacEwen (born 1973), Washington State Senate
- James B. McEwan (1855–1915), New York State Senate
- Jen McEwen (born 1977), Minnesota State Senate
- Robert C. McEwen (1920–1997), New York State Senate
