= Almanzo =

Almanzo is a masculine given name. Notable people with the given name include:

- Almanzo W. Litchard (1841–1906), American soldier, farmer, and legislator
- Almanzo Wilder (1859–1949), American relative of authors
