= Senator O'Donnell =

Senator O'Donnell may refer to:

- John O'Donnell (Lewis County, New York) (1827–1899), New York State Senate
- Michael O'Donnell (Kansas politician) (born 1985), Kansas State Senate
- Frank A. O'Donnel (1852–1906), New York State Senate
