= J. Franklin Barnes =

American physician and politician

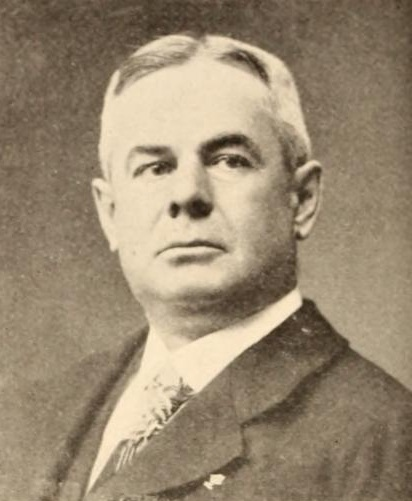
J. Franklin Barnes (1900)

James Franklin Barnes (June 2, 1852, Bellona, New York – October 28, 1914, Watkins Glen, New York) was an American physician and politician from New York.

== Life ==
He was born on June 2, 1852. He studied medicine at Bellevue Hospital from 1872 to 1875. Afterwards he practiced medicine in Watkins, Schuyler County, New York.

Barnes was Supervisor of the Town of Dix in 1883; and a member of the New York State Assembly (Schuyler Co.) in 1884.

In 1894, he was appointed as Secretary to the State Board of Health.

In November 1895, he ran in the 40th District for the New York State Senate, but was defeated by Republican Edwin C. Stewart. In November 1898, he ran again for the State Senate, but was defeated by Republican Charles T. Willis.

Barnes was again a member of the State Assembly in 1900; and was Minority Leader.

== Sources ==
New York State Assembly
Preceded by Adrian Tuttle	New York State Assembly; Schuyler County; 1884	Succeeded by Fremont Cole
Preceded by Charles A. Sloane	New York State Assembly; Schuyler County; 1900	Succeeded by Olin T. Nye
Political offices
Preceded by George M. Palmer	Minority Leader in the New York State Assembly; 1900	Succeeded by Daniel D. Frisbie
