= Clarence W. Smith =

American politician

Member of the New York State Assembly
- In office 1902–1903
- Preceded by: William Harris
- Succeeded by: Frank C. Wood
- Constituency: Fulton and Hamilton Counties

Mayor of Johnstown, New York
- In office 1914–1915
- In office 1918–1919

Personal details
- Born: October 19, 1855 Jay, New York, U.S.
- Died: June 24, 1937 (aged 81) Mount Stewart, Prince Edward Island, Canada
- Party: Republican
- Spouse: Cora Bruce
- Education: University of Michigan Law School
- Profession: Lawyer, Judge

Clarence W. Smith (October 19, 1855 – June 24, 1937) was an American lawyer, judge, and politician from New York.

== Early life and education ==
Smith was born on October 19, 1855, in Jay, New York, the son of Eli Smith, a blacksmith, and Mary Atwood.

Smith initially worked as an assistant for his father and became a teacher at 19. He later attended the academy in Elizabethtown. In 1877, he began studying at the University of Michigan Law School, where he earned his LL.B. and was admitted to the Michigan bar in 1879. After a brief trip west, he returned to Jay. In 1882, he moved to Wells and taught school. After reading law under T. D. Trumbull of Jay, he was admitted to the New York bar in 1883. A few months later, he was elected county judge. After his term as judge expired in 1890, he moved to Johnstown and practiced law with Philip Keck.

== Political career ==
In 1901, Smith was elected to the New York State Assembly as a Republican, representing Fulton and Hamilton Counties. He served in the Assembly in 1902 and 1903. He was later elected mayor of Johnstown, serving from 1914 to 1915 and again from 1918 to 1919. He also served as city attorney for many years, retiring in 1930 at the age of 75.

== Personal life ==
In 1881, Smith married Cora Bruce of Jay. They had one daughter, Mrs. Marion McDonald. Smith was a member of the Freemasons and the Independent Order of Odd Fellows.

Later in life, while living with his sister Sarah Fletcher in Bloomingdale, Smith suffered a stroke. His daughter Marion then brought him to her home in Mount Stewart, Prince Edward Island, Canada, where he spent the last several weeks of his life. He died at Marion's home on June 24, 1937. He was buried in the Central Cemetery in Jay.

New York State Assembly
Preceded by William Harris	New York State Assembly; Fulton and Hamilton Counties; 1902–1903	Succeeded by Frank C. Wood
