= Wicke =

Wicke is a German surname. Notable people with this surname include:

- Carsten Wicke, German-born Indian musician
- Gus Wicke, American voice actor
- Lloyd Christ Wicke, American bishop of the Methodist Church
- Otto Wicke, Danish-American politician
- Peter Wicke, German musicologist
