= John Ford (New York politician) =

American lawyer and politician

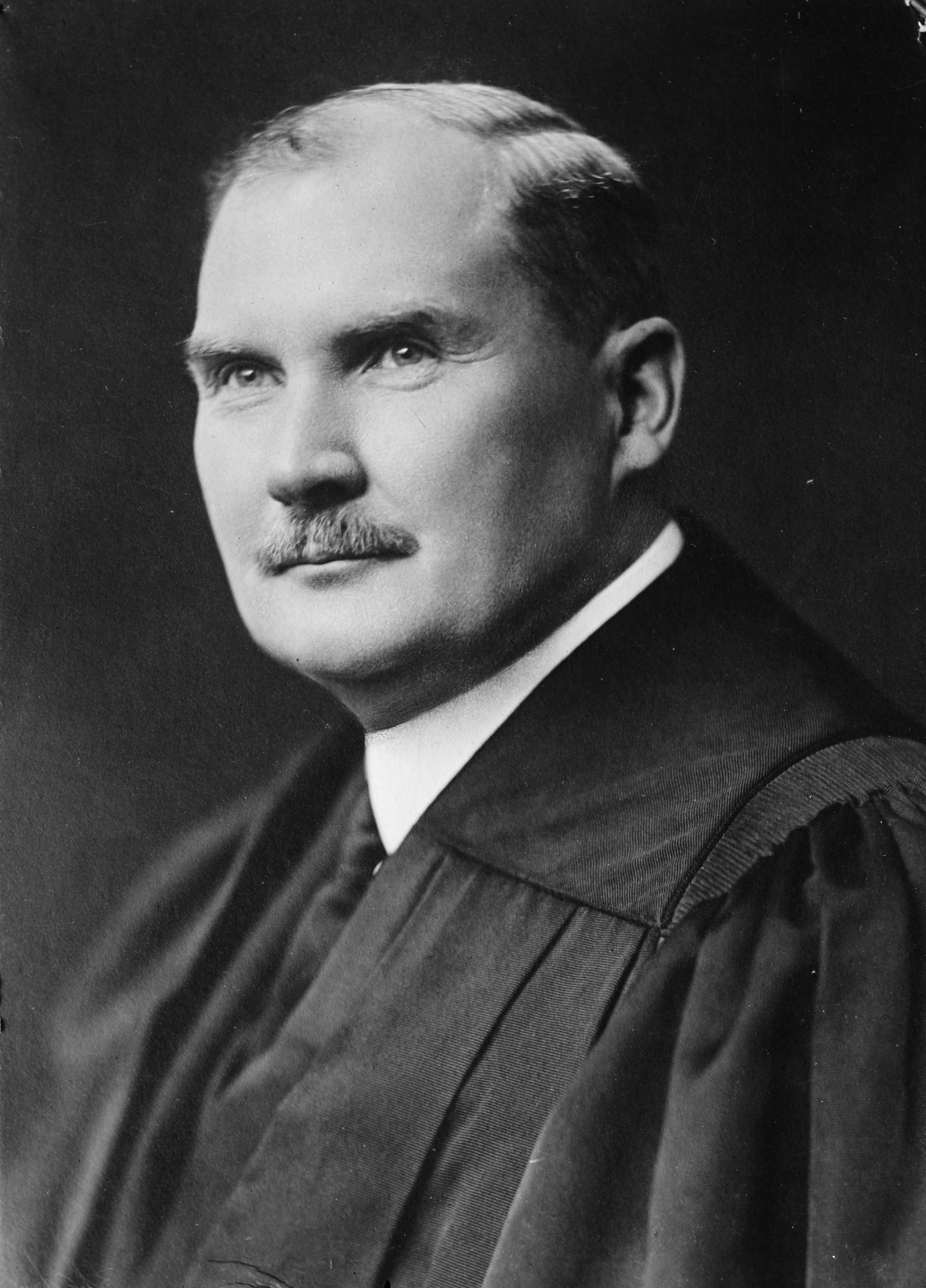
Justice John Ford (1915)

John Ford (July 28, 1862 – July 1941) was an American lawyer and politician from New York.

== Biography ==
Ford was Born in Knowlesville, New York, the son of Michael and Sarah (O'Malley) Ford. He attended occasionally the district schools, and worked as a farm laborer. While working in the stone quarries of Medina, he learned privately, and attended Medina Academy for five months, so that he could go to college. In a competitive examination, he won a free tuition scholarship at Cornell University, and graduated four years later.

While at Cornell, he wrote the essay which won the first prize offered nationwide to senior college students by the American Protective Tariff League. After graduation, he became first an occasional contributor to, then associate editor, and finally editor of, the American Economist, the organ of the Protective Tariff League. For the 1892 presidential campaign, he published a Pocket Cyclopedia of Protection.

While writing for the newspapers, he studied law with Edmund L. Pitts, was admitted to the bar, and practiced in New York City.

Ford was a member of the New York State Senate (18th D.) from 1896 to 1900, sitting in the 119th, 120th, 121st, 122nd, 123rd New York State Legislatures.

In 1905, Ford was proposed as a fusion candidate for Mayor of New York, but the Republican party leaders would not commit themselves to municipal ownership of utilities, and the fusion did not materialize. Ford, who had been a Republican since he had entered politics, favored municipal ownership and joined William Randolph Hearst's Municipal Ownership League.

In 1906, Ford was nominated on the Tammany Hall/Independence League fusion ticket for the New York Supreme Court, and was renominated on the Democratic and Republican tickets in 1920. Ford was a justice of the Supreme Court (1st D.) from 1907 to 1932 when he reached the constitutional age limit. In 1924, Ford supported Progressive Robert M. La Follette for President. Ford publicly supported strengthening obscenity laws in 1923 believing that the average citizen should decide what was obscene rather than a group of the elite.

Ford died from a stroke at the Neurological Institute of New York on July 25, 1941.

New York State Senate
Preceded by Amasa J. Parker, Jr.	New York State Senate; 19th District; 1896–1900	Succeeded by Samuel S. Slater
