= Henry Harrison (New York politician) =

American politician

Henry Harrison (April 2, 1854 – January 3, 1935) was an American businessman and politician from New York.

== Life ==
Harrison was born on April 2, 1854, in Brockport, New York, the son of Josiah Harrison, a grain and produce businessman, and Adelia Field.

Harrison graduated from the Brockport Normal School in 1873. He then went to the University of Rochester, graduating from there in 1877. He initially worked in the grain business in Detroit, but in 1879 he returned to Brockport and became associated with Horace Belden and continued the grain firm established by his father. The firm was one of the largest of its kind in western New York, and in 1897 the company was incorporated as the Henry Harrison Company, with Harrison serving as its president and treasurer.

In 1895, Harrison was elected to the New York State Senate as a Republican, representing New York's 44th State Senate district (Monroe County west of the Genesee River). He served in the Senate in 1896, 1897, and 1898. In 1900, he was appointed collector of customs in Rochester, and he served in that positions for five years. His business grew over time, and he owned 20 grain elevators in western New York by 1925. He was also president of the board of managers of the Brockport Normal School and a director of the Brockport Cold Storage Company and the First National Bank.

Harrison was a member of the Freemasons and Alpha Delta Phi. He was chairman of the board of trustees of the Brockport Presbyterian Church. In 1881, he married Florence J. Lewis. Florence died in 1910, and in 1912 he married Emma P. Smith.

Harrison died at home on January 3, 1935. He was buried in Lake View Cemetery.

New York State Senate
Preceded by District Created	New York State Senate; 44th District; 1896–1898	Succeeded by William W. Armstrong
