= Charles A. Sloane =

American politician

Charles Albert Sloane (May 19, 1850 – January 15, 1912) was an American farmer and politician from New York.

== Life ==
Sloane was born on May 19, 1850 in Middleville, New York, the son of James K. Sloane and Louisa Reno. During the American Civil War, James enlisted in the 76th New York Volunteer Infantry, was wounded in Gettysburg and Antietam, was mustered out and re-enlisted twice, and was killed in the Battle of Fort Fisher.

Sloane grew up in Springfield Center, and until his father died he attended the local schools and academy. When he was 17, he began learning carriage ironing under a Mr. Durfee, working under him for a year. He then moved to Fulton County and began working in the carriage shop of his brother-in-law Moses L. Stockley for the next six years. After his marriage in 1873, he formed a partnership with his father-in-law James Newton in the glove manufacturing business in Johnstown. He was the first to introduce hog-skin gloves, and he travelled across various states for the firm for the next ten years. He then began working as a traveling salesman for D. McCarthy & Sons of Syracuse for the next six years.

In 1877, Sloane moved to Montour Falls. In 1893, he bought an 85-acre farm and began working in general farming and market-gardening. He also engaged in the dairy business by furnishing butter.

Sloane served as a trustee of the village for two years, and was a member of the board of education for six years. He was a town supervisor for Montour and served as chairman of the board of supervisors. In 1897, Sloane was elected to the New York State Assembly as a Republican, representing Schuyler County. He served in the Assembly in 1898 and 1899.

In 1873, Sloane married Annie Newton. They had two sons, James M. and Charles A. He was a member of the Presbyterian church. He was a Freemason

Sloane died of heart failure on January 15, 1912. He was buried in Montour Cemetery.

New York State Assembly
Preceded by Oliver H. Budd	New York State Assembly; Schuyler County; 1898-1899	Succeeded by J. Franklin Barnes
