= Charles T. Willis =

American politician

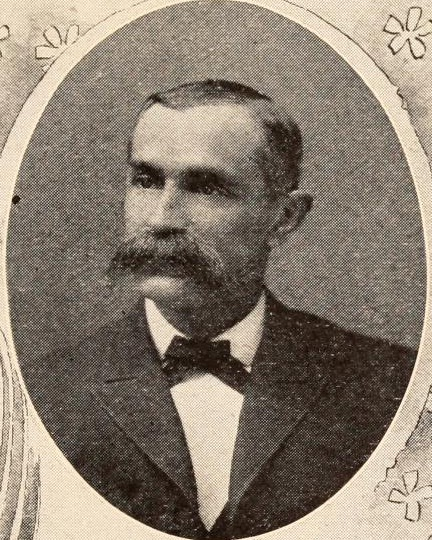
Charles T. Willis (1900)

Charles T. Willis (February 7, 1841 – 1921) was an American politician from New York.

== Life ==
He was born on February 7, 1841, in Waterloo, Seneca County, New York. He attended the common schools, and then became a miller, and later also a farmer, in Tyrone, Schuyler County, New York. He married Emma Jane Williams (1847–1897), and they had several children.

Willis was a member of the New York State Assembly (Schuyler Co.) in 1890 and 1891.

In August 1898, he was nominated in the 40th senatorial district Republican convention with the votes of the delegates from Schuyler and Tompkins counties, defeating Judson A. Gibson who was backed by J. Sloat Fassett and received the votes of Chemung County. At the election in November, Willis defeated the Democratic Ex-Assemblyman J. Franklin Barnes. Willis was a member of the New York State Senate (40th D.) in 1899 and 1900.

He died in 1921, and was buried at the Union Cemetery in Tyrone, New York.

== Sources ==
New York State Assembly
Preceded by Fremont Cole	New York State Assembly; Schuyler County; 1890–1891	Succeeded by William H. Wait
New York State Senate
Preceded by Edwin C. Stewart	New York State Senate; 40th District; 1899–1900	Succeeded by Edwin C. Stewart
