= William Ellison Mills =

American leather manufacturer and politician

William Ellison Mills (April 28, 1859 – September 18, 1930) was an American leather manufacturer and politician from New York.

== Life ==
Mills was born on April 28, 1859, in Gloversville, New York, the son of Darius Case Mills and Eloisa Andalusia Leonard.

After finishing public school at 16, Mills began conducting a retail meat market. In 1880, he joined his brothers Edward H., Leonard C., and Charles O. in paper manufacturing. In 1884, they sold the business and started manufacturing leather under the name Mills Brothers Company. The firm later began manufacturing shoe leather. In 1885, they erected a mill. Mills continued running the business even after the three brothers died. He was also vice president of the City National Bank and Trust Company.

Mills served on the Gloversville City Council. In 1905, he was elected to the New York State Assembly as a Republican, representing Fulton and Hamilton Counties. He served in the Assembly in 1906, 1907, and 1908. During World War I, he directed Liberty Loan drives. In 1926, he was appointed to the Board of the Hudson River Regulating District.

In 1881, Mills married Elwilda Boyle. She died in 1924. In 1928, he married Mrs. Clara Fox. He was a member of the First Methodist church, and was president of its board of trustees. He was president of the board of managers of the Nathan Littauer Hospital, president of the board of trustees for the Gloversville YMCA, a trustee of the Troy Conference Academy, and a director of the Gloversville Chamber of Commerce.

Mills was one of the speakers at the dedication of the Sacandaga Reservoir and the Conklingville Dam. He left the next day for San Francisco. He died there on September 18, 1930, the day before he was to embark on a tour of South Pacific islands. He was buried in the family plot in Prospect Hill Cemetery.

New York State Assembly
Preceded by Frank C. Wood	New York State Assembly; Fulton and Hamilton Counties; 1906-1908	Succeeded by Scott Partridge (New York politician)
