= Lewis Varney =

American lawyer and politician

Lewis Varney (January 29, 1838 – October 5, 1898) was an American lawyer and politician from New York.

== Life ==
He was born in Lake Luzerne, New York on January 29, 1838. His parents were Stephen and Susan Varney. He resided with them in Hadley until he was 21. He attended the Jonesville Academy and the Glen Falls Academy.

Varney studied law in the office of Ellsworth & Butler in Saratoga Springs. He was admitted to the bar in 1861, and quickly won several notable cases. He was a delegate to the 1887 judicial convention and helped get John R. Putnam nominated to the New York Supreme Court.

In 1890, Varney was elected to the New York State Assembly as a Republican, representing the Saratoga County 2nd District. He served in the Assembly in 1891 and 1892. While in the Assembly, he introduced and passed a measure that abolished pensions for judges on the New York Court of Appeals and Supreme Court.

In 1864, Varney married Kate E. Hill. Their four children were Gertrude Hodgeman, Mrs. William H. Waterbury, Lewis C. Varney, and Katherine Varney.

Varney died at home on October 5, 1898, of Bright's disease. He was buried in Greenridge Cemetery.

New York State Assembly
Preceded by Frank M. Boyce	New York State Assembly; Saratoga County, 2nd District; 1891-1892	Succeeded by District Abolished
