= Olin T. Nye =

American politician

Olin Tracy Nye (March 13, 1872 – January 6, 1943) was an American lawyer, judge, and politician from New York. He served on the New York State Assembly.

== Early life ==
Nye was born on March 13, 1872 in Beaver Dams, New York. He was the son of E. M. W. Nye and Margaret Sharpe. He attended Dundee Preparatory School. In 1893, he was appointed clerk of the Schuyler County Surrogate's Court. In 1896, he graduated from Albany Law School.

== Career ==
In 1896, Nye was admitted to the bar, and was elected district attorney of Schuyler County.

In 1899, Nye unsuccessfully ran for the New York State Assembly, losing to J. Franklin Barnes. In 1900, he was elected to the Assembly as a Republican, representing Schuyler County. He served in the Assembly in 1901, 1902, 1903, and 1904.

After serving in the Assembly, Nye served as County Judge and Surrogate for eleven years. After resigning in 1918, he joined a law firm in Buffalo. There, he represented International Railway and tried over 2,000 cases for them, mainly involving a strike against the railway after a train wreck killed and injured many and led to over 4,000 arrests. In 1925, he re-established a law office in Schuyler County. In 1936, he was elected judge, an office he held until a few days before he died.

He was dean of the Schuyler County Bar Association.

=== Personal life ===
Nye had two children, John and Mrs. Carolyn Sams. They lived in Watkin Glens, New York.

Nye was an active member of the Elks and the Red Men, serving as state Grand Sachen of the latter organization. He was also a member of the Knights of Pythias and the Independent Order of Odd Fellows. He served as a vestryman of St. James Episcopal Church.

Nye died at home in Watkins Glenn on January 6, 1943. He was buried in Glenwood Cemetery in Watkins Glen.

New York State Assembly
| Preceded by J. Franklin Barnes | New York State Assembly; Schuyler County; 1901-1904 | Succeeded by John W. Gurnett |
