= William W. Armstrong (politician) =

American lawyer and politician

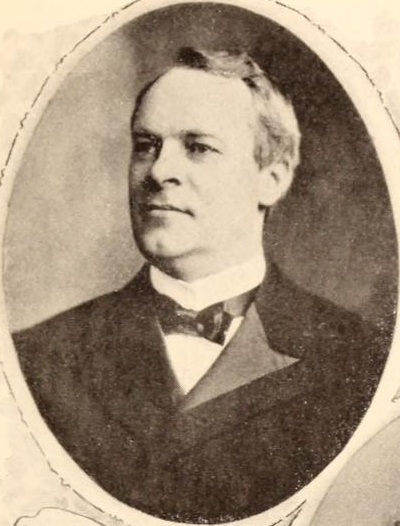
William W. Armstrong (1902)

William W. Armstrong (1864 – July 20, 1944) was an American lawyer and politician from Rochester, Monroe County, New York. In addition to his long legal career in Rochester, he represented his city in both houses of the state legislature. While a member of the state Senate he led an investigation into life insurance company operations and financing that led to publishing the Armstrong Report in 1906. He described himself once as a minority of a minority, since he was "An Irishman, a protestant, and a Republican."

== Life ==
Armstrong was born to Irish immigrants in Rochester, New York, but while an infant his family moved to Albion, New York where he attended public schools and spent his young adulthood. His formal education was ended in 1880 when he started work to help his family after his father became blind. But he continued study and was admitted to the bar early in 1888.

Armstrong was a member of the New York State Assembly (Monroe Co., 3rd D.) in 1895, 1896, 1897 and 1898. During his second term, he caused quite a row and made his reputation for honesty. While speaking against a bill wanted by the Insurance companies and the state commission, he read aloud into the record a note he had been handed from Senator J. Irving Burns that it could be made worth his while to drop his opposition. In 1898, Armstrong was elected to the state Senate while Burns was defeated.

Armstrong was a member of the New York State Senate from 1899 to 1908, sitting in the 122nd, 123rd, 124th, 125th, 126th, 127th, 128th, 129th (all eight 44th D.), 130th and 131st New York State Legislatures (both 46th D.).

== Notes ==
New York State Assembly
Preceded by William H. Denniston	New York State Assembly; Monroe County, 3rd District; 1895–1898	Succeeded by Richard Gardiner
New York State Senate
Preceded by Henry Harrison	New York State Senate; 44th District; 1899–1906	Succeeded by S. Percy Hooker
Preceded by Frederick C. Stevens	New York State Senate; 46th District; 1907–1908	Succeeded by Charles J. White
