= 121st New York State Legislature =

New York state legislative session

| ← | 120th | 122nd | → |
- New York State Capitol (2009)

Overview
- Legislative body: New York State Legislature
- Jurisdiction: New York, United States
- Term: January 1 – December 31, 1898

Senate
- Members: 50
- President: Lt. Gov. Timothy L. Woodruff (R)
- Temporary President: Timothy E. Ellsworth (R)
- Party control: Republican (36-14)

Assembly
- Members: 150
- Speaker: James M. E. O'Grady (R)
- Party control: Republican (80-70)

Sessions
- 1st: January 5 – March 31, 1898
- 2nd: July 11 – 16, 1898

The 121st New York State Legislature, consisting of the New York State Senate and the New York State Assembly, met from January 5 to July 16, 1898, during the second year of Frank S. Black's governorship, in Albany.

== Background ==
Under the provisions of the New York Constitution of 1894, 50 Senators and 150 assemblymen were elected in single-seat districts; senators for a two-year term, assemblymen for a one-year term. The senatorial districts were made up of entire counties, except New York County (twelve districts), Kings County (seven districts), Erie County (three districts) and Monroe County (two districts). The Assembly districts were made up of contiguous area, all within the same county.

At the 1895 New York state election, the state officers and state senators were elected to an exceptional three-year term (for the sessions of 1896, 1897 and 1898), so that the election of these officers would be held, beginning in 1898, in even-numbered years, at the same time as the gubernatorial election.

At this time there were two major political parties: the Republican Party and the Democratic Party. The Socialist Labor Party and the Prohibition Party also nominated tickets.

== Elections ==
The 1897 New York state election was held on November 2. The only statewide elective office up for election was carried by Democrat Alton B. Parker. The approximate party strength at this election, as expressed by the vote for Chief Judge of the Court of Appeals, was: Democratic 555,000; Republican 494,000; Socialist Labor 21,000; and Prohibition 20,000.

== Sessions ==
The Legislature met for the regular session at the State Capitol in Albany on January 5, 1898; and adjourned on March 31.

James M. E. O'Grady (R) was re-elected Speaker, against Thomas F. Donnelly (D).

On April 25, Congress declared that the Spanish–American War had begun four days previously. Many New Yorkers volunteered to fight for the independence of Cuba, among them Assistant U.S. Secretary of the Navy Theodore Roosevelt and Assemblyman William A. Chanler.

The Legislature met for a special session on July 11; and adjourned on July 16. The Legislature enacted a Metropolitan District Elections law which took the organization of elections in New York City out of the hands of the metropolitan police force, then headed by Chief William Stephen Devery, and placed them instead in the hands of a State Superintendent of Elections, appointed by the Governor, and confirmed by the Senate. A few minutes after the law was passed, John McCullagh, Devery's predecessor as head of the metropolitan police, was appointed to the office. The Legislature also appropriated money to an additional war fund; and enacted a Soldiers Vote law, expecting it being necessary to take the vote of the New Yorkers engaged in the Spanish–American War in the field during the next state election.

== State Senate ==
=== Districts ===
- 1st District: Richmond and Suffolk counties
- 2nd District: Queens County
- 3rd District: 1st, 2nd, 3rd, 4th, 5th and 6th Ward of Brooklyn, as constituted in 1894
- 4th District: 7th, 13th, 19th and 21st Ward of Brooklyn, as constituted in 1894
- 5th District: 8th, 10th, 12th and 30th Ward of Brooklyn, and the annexed former Town of Gravesend, as constituted in 1894
- 6th District: 9th, 11th, 20th and 22nd Ward of Brooklyn, as constituted in 1894
- 7th District: 14th, 15th, 16th and 17th Ward of Brooklyn, as constituted in 1894
- 8th District: 23rd, 24th, 25th and 29th Ward of Brooklyn; and the annexed former Town of Flatlands, as constituted in 1894
- 9th District: 18th, 26th, 27th and 28th Ward of Brooklyn, as constituted in 1894
- 10th, 11th, 12th, 13th, 14th, 15th, 16th, 17th, 18th, 19th, 20th and 21st District: Parts of the City of New York, defined geographically by their bordering streets, regardless of Wards or Assembly districts
- 22nd District: Westchester County
- 23rd District: Orange and Rockland counties
- 24th District: Columbia, Dutchess and Putnam and counties
- 25th District: Greene and Ulster counties
- 26th District: Chenango, Delaware and Sullivan counties
- 27th District: Fulton, Hamilton, Montgomery and Schoharie counties
- 28th District: Saratoga, Schenectady and Washington counties
- 29th District: Albany County
- 30th District: Rensselaer County
- 31st District: Clinton, Essex and Warren counties
- 32nd District: Franklin and St. Lawrence counties
- 33rd District: Otsego and Herkimer counties
- 34th District: Oneida County
- 35th District: Jefferson and Lewis counties
- 36th District: Onondaga County
- 37th District: Oswego and Madison counties
- 38th District: Broome, Cortland and Tioga counties
- 39th District: Cayuga and Seneca counties
- 40th District: Chemung, Schuyler and Tompkins counties
- 41st District: Steuben and Yates counties
- 42nd District: Ontario and Wayne counties
- 43rd District: 4th, 6th, 7th, 8th, 12th, 13th, 14th, 16th, 17th and 18th Ward of Rochester; and the towns of Brighton, Henrietta, Irondequoit, Menden, Penfield, Perinton, Pittsford, Rush and Webster, in Monroe County
- 44th District: 1st, 2nd, 3rd, 5th, 9th, 10th, 11th, 15th, 19th and 20th Ward of Rochester; and the towns of Chili, Clarkson, Gates, Greece, Hamlin, Ogden, Parma, Riga, Sweden and Wheatland, in Monroe County
- 45th District: Genesee, Niagara and Orleans counties
- 46th District: Allegany, Livingston and Wyoming counties
- 47th District: 1st, 2nd, 3rd, 6th, 15th, 19th, 20th, 21st, 22nd, 23rd and 24th Ward of Buffalo
- 48th District: 4th, 5th, 7th, 8th, 9th, 10th, 11th, 12th, 13th, 14th and 16th Ward of Buffalo
- 49th District: 17th, 18th and 25th Ward of the City of Buffalo; and all area in Erie County outside Buffalo
- 50th District: Cattaraugus and Chautauqua counties

Note: In 1897, New York County (the boroughs of Manhattan and Bronx), Kings County (the borough of Brooklyn), Richmond County (the borough of Staten Island) and the Western part of Queens County (the borough of Queens) were consolidated into the present-day City of New York. The Eastern part of Queens County (the non-consolidated part) was separated in 1899 as Nassau County. Parts of the 1st and 2nd Assembly districts of Westchester County were annexed by New York City in 1895, and became part of the Borough of the Bronx in 1898.

=== Members ===
The asterisk (*) denotes members of the previous Legislature who continued in office as members of this Legislature.

| District | Senator | Party | Notes |
|---|---|---|---|
| 1st | Richard Higbie* | Republican | |
| 2nd | Theodore Koehler* | Democrat | |
| 3rd | Frank Gallagher* | Democrat | |
| 4th | George W. Brush* | Republican | |
| 5th | Michael J. Coffey* | Democrat | |
| 6th | Peter H. McNulty* | Democrat | |
| 7th | Patrick H. McCarren* | Democrat | |
| 8th | Albert A. Wray* | Republican | |
| 9th | Julius L. Wieman* | Republican | |
| 10th | John F. Ahearn* | Democrat | |
| 11th | Timothy D. Sullivan* | Democrat | |
| 12th | Samuel J. Foley* | Democrat | |
| 13th | Bernard F. Martin* | Democrat | |
| 14th | Thomas F. Grady* | Democrat | |
| 15th | Frank D. Pavey* | Republican | |
| 16th | Louis Munzinger* | Democrat | |
| 17th | Charles B. Page* | Republican | |
| 18th | Maurice Featherson* | Democrat | |
| 19th | John Ford* | Republican | |
| 20th | Jacob A. Cantor* | Democrat | Minority Leader |
| 21st | Charles L. Guy* | Democrat | |
| 22nd | J. Irving Burns* | Republican | |
| 23rd | Clarence Lexow* | Republican | |
| 24th | William C. Daley* | Republican | |
| 25th | Charles Davis* | Republican | |
| 26th | John Grant* | Republican | |
| 27th | Hobart Krum* | Republican | |
| 28th | Edgar T. Brackett* | Republican | |
| 29th | Myer Nussbaum* | Republican | |
| 30th | LeGrand C. Tibbits* | Republican | |
| 31st | George Chahoon* | Republican | |
| 32nd | George R. Malby* | Republican | |
| 33rd | Walter L. Brown* | Republican | |
| 34th | Henry J. Coggeshall* | Ind. Rep. | |
| 35th | Elon R. Brown | Republican | elected to fill vacancy, in place of Joseph Mullin |
| 36th | Horace White* | Republican | |
| 37th | Nevada N. Stranahan* | Republican | |
| 38th | William Elting Johnson* | Republican | |
| 39th | Benjamin M. Wilcox* | Republican | |
| 40th | Edwin C. Stewart* | Republican | |
| 41st | John S. Sheppard* | Republican | |
| 42nd | John Raines* | Republican | |
| 43rd | Cornelius R. Parsons* | Republican | |
| 44th | Henry Harrison* | Republican | |
| 45th | Timothy E. Ellsworth* | Republican | President pro tempore |
| 46th | Lester H. Humphrey* | Republican | |
| 47th | Charles Lamy* | Republican | |
| 48th | Simon Seibert* | Republican | |
| 49th | George Allen Davis* | Republican | |
| 50th | Frank W. Higgins* | Republican | |

=== Employees ===
- Clerk: James S. Whipple
- Sergeant-at-Arms: Garret J. Benson
- Doorkeeper: Nathan Lewis
- Stenographer: Edward Shaughnessy

== State Assembly ==
=== Assemblymen ===
| District | | Assemblymen | Party | Notes |
|---|---|---|---|---|
| Albany | 1st | William L. Coughtry | Republican | |
| Albany | 2nd | James B. McEwan* | Republican | |
| Albany | 3rd | George T. Kelly* | Democrat | |
| Albany | 4th | George W. Stedman | Republican | |
| Allegany | | Almanzo W. Litchard | Republican | |
| Broome | 1st | Charles E. Fuller* | Republican | |
| Broome | 2nd | Edgar L. Vincent | Republican | |
| Cattaraugus | 1st | George A. Stoneman | Republican | |
| Cattaraugus | 2nd | Girvease A. Matteson* | Republican | |
| Cayuga | 1st | Elias Q. Dutton | Republican | |
| Cayuga | 2nd | George S. Fordyce | Republican | |
| Chautauqua | 1st | Frederick R. Peterson* | Republican | |
| Chautauqua | 2nd | S. Frederick Nixon* | Republican | Majority Leader |
| Chemung | | John H. Holbert* | Republican | |
| Chenango | | Jotham P. Allds* | Republican | |
| Clinton | | Edmund J. Pickett | Democrat | |
| Columbia | | Robert Hoes* | Republican | |
| Cortland | | David W. Van Hoesen | Democrat | |
| Delaware | | Delos Axtell | Republican | |
| Dutchess | 1st | John A. Hanna* | Republican | |
| Dutchess | 2nd | William A. Tripp | Republican | |
| Erie | 1st | Anthony J. Boland | Democrat | |
| Erie | 2nd | Henry W. Hill* | Republican | |
| Erie | 3rd | William Maloney* | Democrat | |
| Erie | 4th | John C. Mohring | Democrat | |
| Erie | 5th | Henry Streifler | Democrat | |
| Erie | 6th | Nicholas J. Miller* | Republican | |
| Erie | 7th | John K. Patton | Republican | |
| Erie | 8th | E. Freeman Baker | Republican | |
| Essex | | James H. Pierce* | Republican | |
| Franklin | | Thomas A. Sears* | Republican | |
| Fulton and Hamilton | | Daniel Hays | Republican | |
| Genesee | | John J. Ellis | Republican | |
| Greene | | Sylvester B. Sage | Democrat | |
| Herkimer | | E. LaGrange Smith | Republican | |
| Jefferson | 1st | Walter Zimmerman* | Republican | |
| Jefferson | 2nd | Cornelius J. Clark* | Republican | |
| Kings | 1st | Henry S. Griggs | Democrat | |
| Kings | 2nd | John McKeown* | Democrat | |
| Kings | 3rd | Thomas H. Cullen* | Democrat | |
| Kings | 4th | David Floyd Davis | Republican | |
| Kings | 5th | Abram C. DeGraw | Republican | |
| Kings | 6th | William R. McGuire | Democrat | |
| Kings | 7th | Francis P. Gallagher | Democrat | |
| Kings | 8th | Thomas J. Farrell | Democrat | |
| Kings | 9th | John J. Cain* | Democrat | |
| Kings | 10th | Samuel M. Hubbard | Democrat | |
| Kings | 11th | Joseph A. Guider | Democrat | |
| Kings | 12th | Charles C. Schoeneck | Democrat | |
| Kings | 13th | Bartley J. Wright | Democrat | |
| Kings | 14th | August F. Schmid | Democrat | |
| Kings | 15th | Harry H. Dale | Democrat | |
| Kings | 16th | Edward C. Brennan* | Republican | |
| Kings | 17th | Henry Marshall* | Republican | |
| Kings | 18th | George Tiffany | Republican | |
| Kings | 19th | Frederick Schmid* | Democrat | |
| Kings | 20th | Otto Wicke | Democrat | |
| Kings | 21st | John E. Reisert | Democrat | |
| Lewis | | Addison L. Clark | Republican | |
| Livingston | | Otto Kelsey* | Republican | |
| Madison | | Robert J. Fish* | Republican | |
| Monroe | 1st | James B. Perkins | Republican | |
| Monroe | 2nd | James M. E. O'Grady* | Republican | re-elected Speaker; on November 8, 1898, elected to the 56th U.S. Congress |
| Monroe | 3rd | William W. Armstrong* | Republican | |
| Monroe | 4th | Jacob S. Haight | Democrat | |
| Montgomery | | Richard Murphy | Republican | |
| New York | 1st | Daniel E. Finn* | Democrat | |
| New York | 2nd | James Oliver | Democrat | |
| New York | 3rd | Dominick F. Mullaney | Democrat | |
| New York | 4th | Patrick H. Roche* | Democrat | |
| New York | 5th | William A. Chanler | Democrat | did not attend the special session, due to engagement in the Spanish–American War; on November 8, 1898, elected to the 56th U.S. Congress |
| New York | 6th | Timothy P. Sullivan* | Democrat | |
| New York | 7th | John F. Maher | Democrat | |
| New York | 8th | Charles S. Adler* | Republican | |
| New York | 9th | N. Taylor Phillips | Democrat | |
| New York | 10th | Julius Harburger | Democrat | |
| New York | 11th | John J. O'Connor | Democrat | |
| New York | 12th | Joseph Schulum* | Democrat | |
| New York | 13th | Patrick F. Trainor* | Democrat | |
| New York | 14th | Jacob Fritz* | Democrat | |
| New York | 15th | Thomas Smith | Democrat | |
| New York | 16th | Benjamin Hoffman* | Democrat | |
| New York | 17th | John F. Brennan | Democrat | |
| New York | 18th | Charles P. Dillon | Democrat | |
| New York | 19th | Solomon C. Weill | Democrat | contested in the courts; election vacated after his death; died on April 28, 1898 |
| New York | 19th | Perez M. Stewart | Citizens Union | seated on July 11, by order of the Court of Appeals |
| New York | 20th | Cornelius F. Collins | Democrat | |
| New York | 21st | Thomas J. Murray | Democrat | |
| New York | 22nd | Henry Hachemeister | Democrat | |
| New York | 23rd | Mark J. Lowenthal | Republican | |
| New York | 24th | John B. Fitzgerald* | Democrat | |
| New York | 25th | John A. Weekes Jr. | Republican | |
| New York | 26th | Charles S. Sinsheimer | Democrat | |
| New York | 27th | Francis E. Laimbeer* | Ind. Rep. | |
| New York | 28th | Joseph I. Green* | Democrat | |
| New York | 29th | Alfred F. Seligsberg | Gold Dem. | |
| New York | 30th | George W. Meyer Jr.* | Democrat | |
| New York | 31st | Albert E. Crabtree | Democrat | |
| New York | 32nd | Thomas F. Donnelly* | Democrat | Minority Leader |
| New York | 33rd | John J. Egan | Democrat | |
| New York | 34th | Lyman W. Redington | Democrat | |
| New York | 35th | Richard H. Mitchell | Democrat | |
| Niagara | 1st | Dow Vroman | Democrat | |
| Niagara | 2nd | Henry S. Tompkins | Democrat | |
| Oneida | 1st | John Williams | Republican | |
| Oneida | 2nd | Louis M. Martin | Republican | |
| Oneida | 3rd | John E. Mason | Republican | |
| Onondaga | 1st | William G. Cottle | Ind. Rep. | |
| Onondaga | 2nd | Edward G. Ten Eyck* | Republican | |
| Onondaga | 3rd | Joseph Bondy* | Republican | |
| Onondaga | 4th | John T. Delaney | Republican | |
| Ontario | | Robert B. Simmons | Republican | |
| Orange | 1st | Louis F. Goodsell* | Republican | |
| Orange | 2nd | Daniel P. Shultz | Democrat | |
| Orleans | | Dennis W. Evarts | Republican | |
| Oswego | 1st | Louis P. Taylor* | Republican | |
| Oswego | 2nd | Thomas M. Costello* | Republican | |
| Otsego | | Leland M. Cowles | Republican | |
| Putnam | | Emerson W. Addis* | Republican | |
| Queens | 1st | George L. Glaser | Democrat | |
| Queens | 2nd | Cyrus B. Gale | Democrat | |
| Queens | 3rd | George Wallace | Republican | |
| Rensselaer | 1st | Benjamin O. Brewster | Republican | |
| Rensselaer | 2nd | William Hutton Jr.* | Democrat | |
| Rensselaer | 3rd | Michael Russell | Republican | |
| Richmond | | Charles J. Kullman | Democrat | |
| Rockland | | Irving Brown | Democrat | |
| St. Lawrence | 1st | Ira C. Miles* | Republican | |
| St. Lawrence | 2nd | Martin V. B. Ives* | Republican | |
| Saratoga | | George W. Kavanaugh* | Republican | |
| Schenectady | | John C. Myers | Democrat | |
| Schoharie | | George M. Palmer* | Democrat | |
| Schuyler | | Charles A. Sloane | Republican | |
| Seneca | | William V. Van Rensselaer | Republican | |
| Steuben | 1st | Edward D. Cross | Republican | |
| Steuben | 2nd | Hyatt C. Hatch | Republican | |
| Suffolk | 1st | Erastus F. Post* | Republican | |
| Suffolk | 2nd | Carll S. Burr Jr.* | Republican | |
| Sullivan | | George McLaughlin* | Republican | |
| Tioga | | Daniel P. Witter* | Republican | |
| Tompkins | | Theron Johnson | Republican | |
| Ulster | 1st | Jacob H. Tremper | Republican | |
| Ulster | 2nd | Charles J. Ackert | Democrat | |
| Warren | | Taylor J. Eldridge* | Republican | |
| Washington | | Charles R. Paris | Republican | |
| Wayne | | Marvin I. Greenwood | Republican | |
| Westchester | 1st | Jared Sandford | Democrat | |
| Westchester | 2nd | William J. Graney | Democrat | |
| Westchester | 3rd | John Gibney | Democrat | |
| Wyoming | | Daniel P. Whipple | Republican | |
| Yates | | Miles W. Raplee* | Republican | |

=== Employees ===
- Clerk: Archie E. Baxter
- Assistant Clerk: Ray B. Smith
- Sergeant-at-Arms: James C. Crawford

== Sources ==
- The New York Red Book compiled by Edgar L. Murlin (published by James B. Lyon, Albany NY, 1897; see pg. 133–177 for senators' bios; between pg. 136 and 137 for senators' portraits; pg. 404 for list of senators; and pg. 712–716 for senate districts)
- Official New York from Cleveland to Hughes by Charles Elliott Fitch (Hurd Publishing Co., New York and Buffalo, 1911, Vol. IV; see pg. 338f for assemblymen; and 364 for senators)
- Public Service by James S. Barcus (The Globe Publishing Co., New York, 1898; see pg. 164 for senators; 165–168 for assemblymen; 168 for senate employees; and 169 for assembly employees; has also maps of senate and assembly districts)
- THE DEMOCRATIC CAUCUS in NYT on January 5, 1898
