= Baxter T. Smelzer =

American politician

Baxter Timothy Smelzer (March 27, 1852 – January 17, 1932) was an American physician and politician from New York.

== Life ==
Smelzer was born on March 27, 1852, in Lodi, New York, the son of Philip Smelzer and Matilda (Meeker) Bedell.

Smelzer attended Genesee Wesleyan Seminary in Lima and Syracuse University. He studied medicine at the University of Michigan Medical School in Ann Arbor, Michigan, and Bellevue Hospital in New York City, graduating from the latter in 1874. He then began practicing medicine in Havana, later known as Montour Falls. He served as president of the village board of trustees, and was a member and president of the board of education. He specialized in surgery, and was a member of the State and County Medical Association as well as Elmira Academy of Medicine.

In 1893, Smelzer was elected to the New York State Senate as a Republican, representing New York's 24th State Senate district (Schuyler, Seneca, Chemung, and Steuben Counties). He served in the Senate in 1894 and 1895. While in the Senate, he was chairman of a committee appointed to investigate the State Board of Health, was instrumental in passing the Public Health Law and other bills related to the medical profession, and secured appropriations for Schuyler County and a new charter for the city of Elmira. In 1895, he was appointed Secretary of the State Board of Health, an office he held until 1901. From 1901 to 1907, he worked as a medical expert for the New York State Department of Health. He then moved to Albany and practiced medicine there.

In 1876, Smelzer married Lucy Huntington Tracy. They had a son, C. Tracy. He was a member of Psi Upsilon.

Smelzer died in his Albany home on January 17, 1932. He was buried in Montour Cemetery.

New York State Senate
Preceded by Charles E. Walker	New York State Senate; 27th District; 1894–1895	Succeeded by Hobart Krum
