= Maurice Featherson =

American politician (1862–1953)

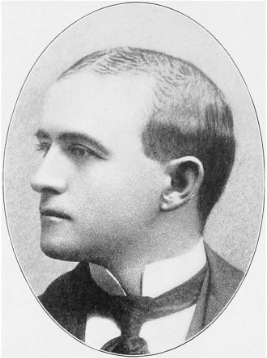
Maurice Featherson

Maurice Featherson (November 1862 – December 12, 1953) was an American politician from New York.

== Biography ==
Featherson was born in November 1862 in New York City. He attended the public schools, and then became a machinist, and later a master machinist, of the New York City Fire Department. He joined Tammany Hall, and became President of the New York Sand and Gravel Company, and was connected with the Uvalde Asphalt Paving Company. Both companies took part in public works in New York City.

Featherson was a member of the New York State Senate (18th D.) from 1896 to 1900, sitting in the 119th, 120th, 121st, 122nd, 123rd New York State Legislatures.

In 1904, he was appointed by Mayor George B. McClellan as Commissioner of Docks and Ferries, and remained in office until the end of 1905.

He died on December 12, 1953, in New York City.

New York State Senate
| Preceded by Michael F. Collins | New York State Senate; 18th District; 1896–1900 | Succeeded by Victor J. Dowling |
