= Daniel D. Frisbie =

American businessman and politician

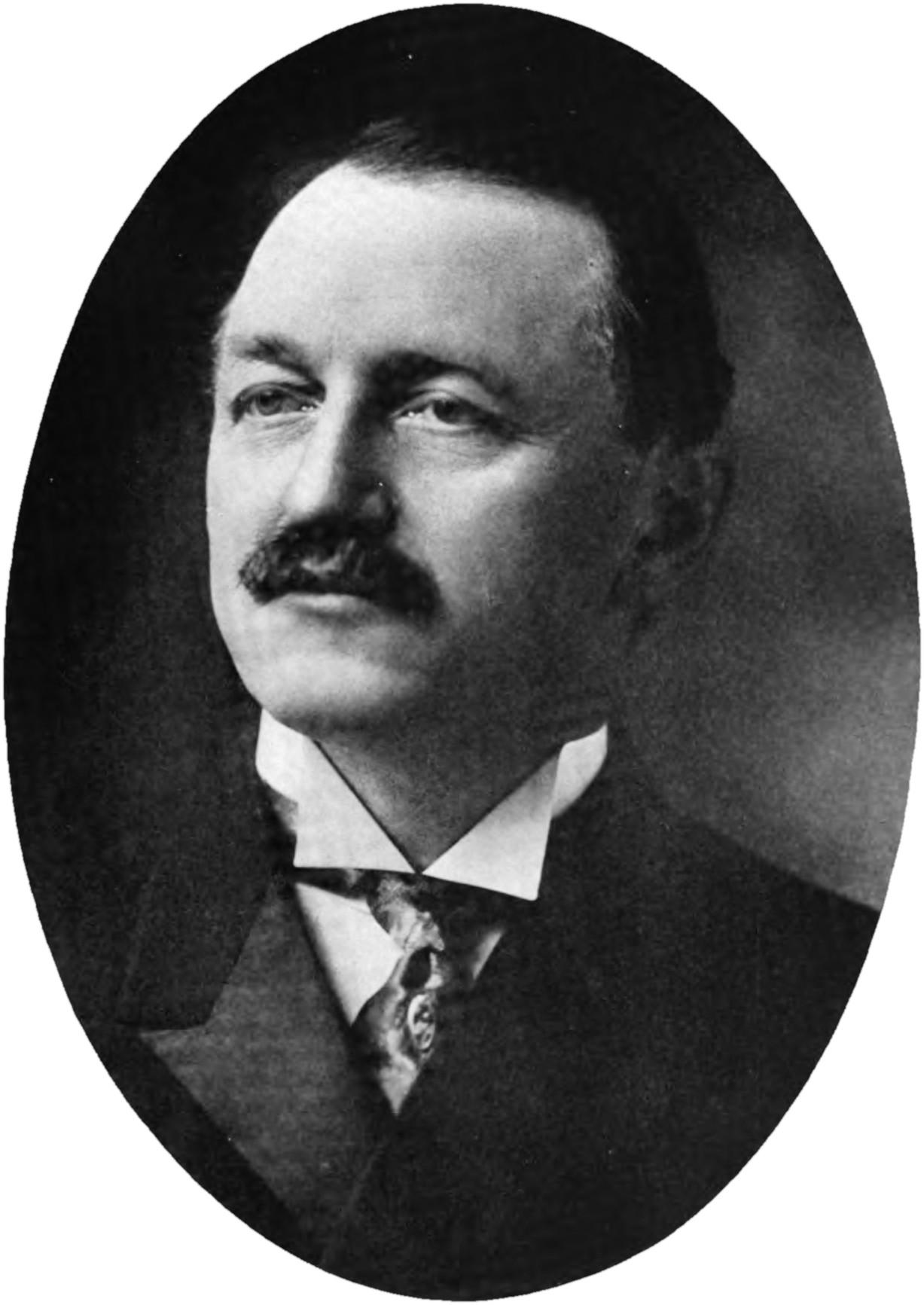
Daniel D. Frisbie (1916)

Daniel Dodge Frisbie (November 30, 1859 Middleburgh, Schoharie County, New York - August 6, 1931 Middleburgh, Schoharie Co., New York) was an American businessman and politician.

== Life ==
Frisbie was educated in his hometown and later attended Hartwick Seminary in Cooperstown, New York. In 1882, he married Eleanor Manning, and they had three children.

In the 1880s, Frisbie purchased two local newspapers and opened two insurance companies. Later, he was president of the local railroad and utility company. In 1904, as the editor of the Schoharie Democratic-Republican, he was elected President of the Democratic New York State Editorial Association.

Frisbie was a member of the New York State Assembly (Schoharie Co.) in 1900, 1901, 1909, 1910, 1911 and 1912; and was Minority Leader in 1901, 1909 and 1910; and Speaker in 1911. During his speakership happened the last election of a U.S. Senator from New York by the State Legislature: after a three-month-long deadlock, James Aloysius O`Gorman was elected to succeed Chauncey Depew.

Frisbie was a member of the New York State Commission for the Panama–Pacific International Exposition in 1915.

== Sources ==
- EDITORS HAVE BUSY DAY in NYT on September 8, 1904
- MURPHY PICKS GRADY TO LEAD THE SENATE in NYT on December 17, 1910
- WAGNER IS LEADER; GRADY STAYS AWAY in NYT on January 4, 1911
- State of New York at the Panama-Pacific International Exposition, San Francisco, California, 1915 (Albany, 1916; pg. 28)

New York State Assembly
Preceded by George M. Palmer	New York State Assembly; Schoharie County; 1900-1901	Succeeded by George M. Palmer
Preceded by George M. Palmer	New York State Assembly; Schoharie County; 1909-1912	Succeeded by Edward Dox
Political offices
Preceded by J. Franklin Barnes	Minority Leader of the New York State Assembly; 1901	Succeeded by George M. Palmer
Preceded by George M. Palmer	Minority Leader of the New York State Assembly; 1909-1910	Succeeded by Edwin A. Merritt, Jr.
Preceded by James W. Wadsworth, Jr.	Speaker of the New York State Assembly; 1911	Succeeded by Edwin A. Merritt, Jr.
