= Patrick F. Trainor =

American politician

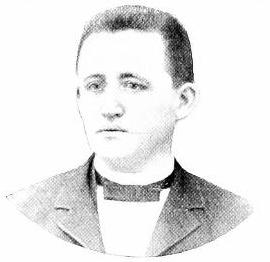
Trainor c. 1894

Patrick F. Trainor (January 4, 1863 Glasgow, Scotland – December 25, 1902 Albany, New York) was an American politician from New York.

== Life ==
The family emigrated to the United States when Patrick was still a child. He attended St. Michael's Parochial School and 35th Street Public School in New York City, and then worked for the American District Telegraph Company. Later he became the manager of the Boston and Ohio Telegraph Company's New York City branch, and then was assistant to the General Manager of the company, at Washington, D.C. He returned to New York City in 1885, and began to study law.

Trainor was a member of the New York State Assembly in 1894 (New York Co., 17th D.), 1896, 1897, 1898, 1899 and 1900 (all five New York Co., 13th D.). He was admitted to the bar in 1899.

He was a member of the New York State Senate (16th D.) in 1901 and 1902. In November 1902, he was re-elected to the State Senate, but died a few days before the next term began.

"Suffering from an insidious nervous disease", he went to take the water cure at Clifton Springs, and in August 1902 went to Albany where he died on Christmas Day at the Ten Eyck Hotel. He was buried at the Calvary Cemetery in Queens.

== Sources ==
- Official New York from Cleveland to Hughes by Charles Elliott Fitch (Hurd Publishing Co., New York and Buffalo, 1911, Vol. IV; pg. 332, 335, 337, 339f, 342 and 365)
- New York State Legislative Souvenir by Henry P. Phelps (1894; pg. 66)
- The New York Red Book compiled by Edgar L. Murlin (published by James B. Lyon, Albany NY, 1897; pg. 269)
- SENATOR TRAINOR DEAD in NYT on December 26, 1902
- SENATOR TRAINOR BURIED in NYT on DEcember 28, 1902

New York State Assembly
| Preceded by John Kerrigan | New York State Assembly; New York County, 17th District; 1894 | Succeeded by Robert Miller |
| Preceded by William Halpin | New York State Assembly; New York County, 13th District; 1896–1900 | Succeeded by Richard S. Reilley |
New York State Senate
| Preceded by Louis Munzinger | New York State Senate; 16th District; 1901–1902 | Succeeded by Peter J. Dooling |
