= Richard H. Mitchell =

American politician

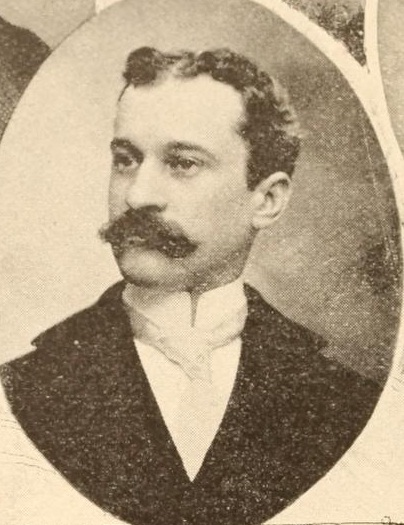
Richard H. Mitchell (1900)

Richard Henry Mitchell (August 27, 1869 – February 12, 1933) was an American lawyer and politician from New York.

== Life ==
He was born on August 27, 1869, in McKeesport, Allegheny County, Pennsylvania, the son of James B. Mitchell and Emma (Henry) Mitchell. He attended Grammar School No. 61, and graduated from City College of New York in 1888. He attended Columbia Law School, was admitted to the bar in 1891, and practiced in New York City.

Mitchell was a member of the New York State Assembly (New York Co., 35th D.) in 1898; and a member of the New York State Senate (21st D.) in 1899 and 1900. In 1900, Mitchell and Joseph P. Hennessy were nominated for the Senate by rival factions of the Democratic Party in the 21st District. The contest went to the New York Supreme Court, Appellate Division which decided in favor of Mitchell. On November 2, 1900, the New York Court of Appeals reversed the Appellate Division and ordered that Hennessy's name be placed on the ballot.

Mitchell was Assistant Corporation Counsel in charge of the Bronx from 1904; First Assistant District Attorney of Bronx County until 1916; and a justice of the New York Supreme Court (1st D.) from 1917 until his death in 1933.

He died on February 12, 1933, in Manhattan, of a stroke.

== Sources ==
New York State Assembly
| Preceded by Douglas Mathewson | New York State Assembly; New York County, 35th District; 1898 | Succeeded by George J. Grossman |
New York State Senate
| Preceded by Charles L. Guy | New York State Senate; 21st District; 1899–1900 | Succeeded by Joseph P. Hennessy |
