= Albert H. Pierson =

American politician

Albert Henry Pierson (November 17, 1839 – March 17, 1918) was an American farmer, teacher, and politician from New York.

== Life ==
Pierson was born on November 17, 1839, in Reading, New York. He attended Watkins High School and Starkey Seminary.

During the American Civil War, Pierson enlisted as a private and raised a company of volunteers. He was then mustered in as a captain of Company D, 179th New York Volunteer Infantry Regiment. He received the brevet of major for his service, and served until the end of the war. He was wounded during the Siege of Petersburg. He drove off a drunken surgeon who was about to treat the wound with his revolver and demanded he be treated by the officers' surgeon, who managed to save his limb.

After the War, he worked as a farmer in Trumansburg. He also taught school for fifteen years, and was a school commissioner for six years. He was the vice-president of the Tompkins County Agricultural Society and director of the Union Agricultural Society of Ulysses. From 1885 to 1892, he served as town supervisor of Ulysses.

In 1891, Pierson was elected to the New York State Assembly as a Republican, representing Tompkins County. He served in the Assembly in 1892 and 1893.

Pierson's wife was Harriet. Their children were Mrs. W. B. McNinch, Grace R., Elvin. He was a trustee and deacon of the local Baptist church.

Pierson died at home on March 17, 1918. He was buried in Grove Cemetery.

New York State Assembly
Preceded by Nelson Stevens	New York State Assembly; Tompkins County; 1892-1893	Succeeded by Edwin C. Stewart
