= Edgar L. Vincent =

American farmer, newspaper editor, author, and politician

Edgar La Verne Vincent (December 14, 1851 – July 4, 1936) was an American farmer, newspaper editor, author, and politician from New York.

== Life ==
Vincent was born on December 14, 1851, in Persia, New York, the son of Hiram and Wealthy Vincent. His father was a farmer who fought in the American Civil War and died as a prisoner of war at Belle Isle in 1864.

Vincent initially worked on a farm in the summer while teaching in the winter. He graduated from Friendship Literary Academy in 1876. He entered Union College a year later, staying until he left due to ill health. Interested in newspaper work since boyhood, he began working as a compositor in the offices of the Olean Times. He managed to work his way up to editor-in-chief of the paper's daily and weekly editions. In 1880, following a competitive examination, he was appointed examiner of claims in the Pension Office in Washington, D.C. He worked with them for the next six years, spending the last three of them as special examiner in Ohio and Illinois. His service came to an end when the Democratic Commissioner of Pensions for being an "offensive partisan." He then returned to the newspaper business and worked in an editorial capacity for the Binghamton Republican and the Hartford Courant before buying the Waverly Advocate. He published the latter paper as a Republican journal until 1888, when he left due to poor health. A year later, he moved to Maine, New York and bought a farm.

Vincent wrote articles on farm topics for leading agricultural papers like The Country Gentleman, the Gentleman Farmer, the Stockman and Farmer, The Ohio Farmer, and The New York Times agricultural columns. He wrote several books, including "Margaret Bowlby," "Hot Coals," "Without Sound of Hammer," and "In the Rift of Rick." He was also an editor and advisor for "Binghamton and Broome County, New York, A History."

Vincent was a member of the Board of Supervisors for five years, representing Maine. In 1897, he was elected to the New York State Assembly as a Republican, representing the Broome County 2nd District. He served in the Assembly in 1898 and 1899. He moved to Binghamton in 1905 and conducted a Farms and Farming department for the Binghamton Press for several years.

Vincent was a member of the Freemasons. He was a member and elder of the West Presbyterian Church. In 1880, he married teacher Jennie Fuller. Their children were Assemblyman Edward F. Vincent and Dr. Ralph M. Vincent.

Vincent died at home on July 4, 1936. He was buried in Floral Park Cemetery.

New York State Assembly
Preceded by Charles F. Tupper	New York State Assembly; Broome County, 2nd District; 1898–1899	Succeeded by John H. Swift
