= Leonard A. Giegerich =

American politician (1855–1927)

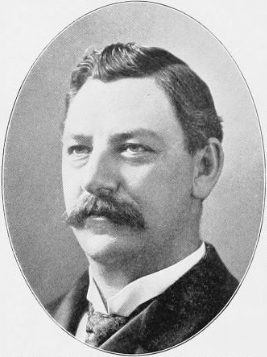

Member of the New York State Assembly from the New York County 12th district
- In office January 1, 1887 – December 31, 1887
- Preceded by: Moses Dinkelspiel
- Succeeded by: Solomon D. Rosenthal

Personal details
- Born: Leonard Anthony Giegerich; May 20, 1855 Rötz, Kingdom of Bavaria
- Died: December 20, 1927 (aged 72)
- Resting place: Woodlawn Cemetery, New York City, U.S.
- Party: Democratic
- Spouse: Louise M. Boll (m. 1877)
- Children: 2
- Education: De La Salle Institute
- Occupation: Politician, lawyer, judge

Leonard Anthony Giegerich (May 20, 1855 – December 20, 1927) was an American lawyer, politician, and judge from New York.

== Life ==
Giegerich was born on May 20, 1855, in Rötz, Kingdom of Bavaria, the son of Leonhard Giegerich and Theresa Kramer.

Giegerich immigrated to America with his family when he was one, settling with them in Woodstock, Connecticut. In 1860, they moved to New York City, settling in the Eleventh Ward. He attended the St. Nicholas parochial school and the De La Salle Institute. He began working to support his family when he was 12. He was admitted to the state bar in 1877.

Giegerich was a member of the Tammany Hall General Committee. In 1886, he was elected to the New York State Assembly as a Democrat, representing the New York County 12th District. He served in the Assembly in 1887. In 1887, President Cleveland appointed him collector of internal revenue for the third New York district. In 1890, Governor Hill appointed him to fill an empty bench on the City Court. Later that year, he was elected County Clerk. He resigned from the office in 1891, when Governor Hill appointed him to fill a vacancy in the Court of Common Pleas. In 1892, he was nominated by both parties and elected to serve a full 14-year term on the bench. He was a delegate to the 1894 New York State Constitutional Convention. Under the new state constitution, he became a justice on the New York Supreme Court. He was re-elected to the office twice and retired as justice in 1925.

Giegerich was a prominent Catholic in New York City, serving as president of the Catholic Club. He was a member of the Knights of Columbus, the Press Club, the Catholic Benevolent Legion, the Arion Society, the Manhattan Club, the New-York Historical Society, and the New York County Lawyers' Association. He was also an honorary member of the New York State Bar Association. In 1877, he married Louise M. Boll. Their children were Leonard A. Jr. and Arthur Nicholas.

Giegerich died at home on December 20, 1927. He was buried in Woodlawn Cemetery.

New York State Assembly
Preceded by Moses Dinkelspiel	New York State Assembly; New York County, 12th District; 1887	Succeeded by Solomon D. Rosenthal
