= Marcus M. Congdon =

American farmer and politician

Marcus Morton Congdon (May 20, 1844 – September 23, 1920) was an American farmer, cheese manufacturer, and politician from New York.

== Life ==
Congdon was born on May 20, 1844, in West Clarksville, New York. His parents were assemblyman Anson Congdon and Rachel Lurvey.

Congdon attended Friendship Academy. He lived in Clarksville, where he worked in farming, cheese manufacturing, and oil producing. In 1867, he helped build the first cheese factory in Clarksville. When the Clarksville oil field began developing in 1882, he promoted the drilling of the first oil well in the region. He was also director of the First National Bank of Cuba. He served as town supervisor for five terms.

In 1891, Congdon was elected to the New York State Assembly as a Republican, representing Allegany County. He defeated the Democratic candidate Hugh J. Coyle by 2508 plurality. He served in the Assembly in 1892 and 1893. He was part of the committees for railroad, electricity, gas, and water supply.

Congdon married Elma E. Keller in 1865. Their children were Mary R. Hammond, Cassius, Archie D. Gail, and Arson.

Congdon died on September 23, 1920. He was buried in Clarksville Cemetery.

New York State Assembly
Preceded by Addison S. Thompson	New York State Assembly; Allegany County; 1892-1893	Succeeded by Fred A. Robbins
