= Horace S. Judson =

American politician

Horace Sprague Judson (June 10, 1863 – November 22, 1926) was an American glove manufacturer and politician from New York.

== Life ==
Horace was born on June 10, 1863, in Kingsboro, a neighborhood in Gloversville, Fulton County, New York. His parents were Daniel Brown Judson, a prominent glove manufacturer, and Phoebe E. Brown. His brother was John B. Judson.

He attended, Williston Seminary, Union Classical Institute, and Union College. He graduated from Union College in 1886, and was a member of the Delta Phi fraternity's Alpha chapter.

After graduating, Horace returned to Gloversville, where he worked as a glove manufacturer. He was president of the local Eureka Club. Between 1890 and 1892, he served as an alderman for Gloversville.

In 1891, Horace was elected to the New York State Assembly as a Democrat, representing Fulton and Hamilton counties. He served in the Assembly in 1892.

Horace was married twice, first to Jessie Belden and then to Mabel Marstellar.

Horace died on November 22, 1926, in Gloversville. He was buried in Prospect Hill Cemetery in Gloversville.

New York State Assembly
Preceded by John Christie	New York State Assembly; Fulton and Hamilton Counties; 1892	Succeeded by Philip Keck
