= David Floyd Davis =

American politician

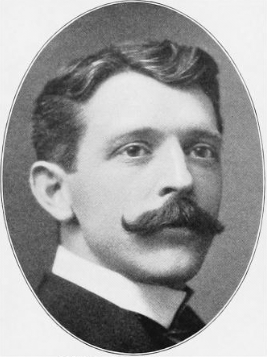

Member of the New York Senate from the 4th district
- In office 1899–1900
- Preceded by: George W. Brush
- Succeeded by: Arthur J. Audett

Personal details
- Born: July 10, 1867 Riverhead, Suffolk County, New York, US
- Died: November 7, 1951 (aged 84) Newark, New Jersey, US
- Spouse: Edith Clyde Smith (m. 1893)

David Floyd Davis (July 10, 1867 – November 7, 1951) was an American businessman and politician from New York.

== Life ==
David Floyd Davis was born in Riverhead on July 10, 1867, the son of David Frank Davis and Betsey Sophia (Wiggins) Davis. In 1890, he opened an oil distribution business. On November 15, 1893, he married Edith Clyde Smith, and they had two children.

Davis was a member of the New York State Assembly (Kings Co., 4th D.) in 1898; and a member of the New York State Senate (4th D.) in 1899 and 1900.

In 1906, he testified before the Interstate Commerce Commission to how Standard Oil was trying to push independent oil dealers out of business.

New York State Assembly
Preceded by George W. Wilson	New York State Assembly; Kings County, 4th District; 1898	Succeeded by Charles H. Cotton
New York State Senate
Preceded by George W. Brush	New York State Senate; 4th District; 1899–1900	Succeeded by Arthur J. Audett
