= Moses Dinkelspiel =

American politician

Moses Dinkelspiel (1893)

Moses Dinkelspiel (June 3, 1855 – May 30, 1916) was an American politician from New York.

== Life ==
He was born on June 3, 1855, in New York City. He was a salesman, a commission merchant, and then a dealer in pictures and artworks. He also entered politics as a Democrat.

Dinkelspiel was a member of the New York State Assembly in 1886. In January 1888, he was appointed as Paymaster at the U.S. Customs House at the port of New York. Soon after he was accused of being involved with gamblers and bookmakers, and he did not take office.

He was again a member of the Assembly in 1889, 1890, 1891, 1892, 1893 and 1894. He was Chairman of the Committee on Trade and Manufactures in 1892; and of the Committee on Public Institutions in 1893.

In April 1893, he married Carrie Sladkus, and they had two children.

He died on May 30, 1916, at his residence at 226 West 97th Street in Manhattan,

New York State Assembly
Preceded by Solomon D. Rosenthal	New York State Assembly; New York County, 12th District; 1886	Succeeded by Leonard A. Giegerich
Preceded by Solomon D. Rosenthal	New York State Assembly; New York County, 12th District; 1889–1892	Succeeded by Frank A. O'Donnel
Preceded by Samuel J. Foley	New York State Assembly; New York County, 6th District; 1893–1894	Succeeded by Benjamin Hoffman
