= Curtis N. Douglas =

American politician

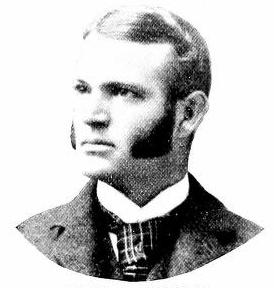
Curtis N. Douglas (1894)

Curtis Noble Douglas (May 28, 1856 in Watertown, Jefferson County, New York – February 9, 1919) was an American businessman and Senator from New York.

== Early life ==
He was the son of John Pettit Douglas and Henrietta (Hughson) Douglas. He attended Brooklyn Collegiate and Polytechnic Institute from 1864 to 1870, and John C. Overheisus Classical School from 1871 to 1873. He graduated B.A. from University of Rochester in 1877. While there, he was a member of the Fraternity of Delta Psi (St. Anthony Hall).

== Career ==
Then he became secretary of his father, an extensive land owner in Jefferson County, and supervised a variety of business operations until 1880. He then pursued a teaching and literary career, becoming headmaster of Betts Academy in Stamford, Connecticut, and then assistant headmaster of J. H. Massis College Preparatory School in New York City. In 1882, he established his own college preparatory school there. In 1886, he married Nancy Sherman Thomson (1867–1927), and they had three children. Upon his marriage, he abandoned teaching, and instead engaged with his father-in-law in the lumber business in Albany, New York.

Douglas was a member of the New York State Assembly (Albany Co., 4th D.) in 1894. His seat was contested by Republican Amos J. Ablett, and the Committee on Elections shortly before the end of the session reported in favor of Ablett, but no action was taken by the Assembly.

Douglas was a member of the New York State Senate (29th D.) in 1899 and 1900.

Douglas was appointed on November 6, 1912, by his brother-in-law, Gov. John Alden Dix, to the Public Service Commission, and remained in office until March 1914. The office carried an annual salary of $15,000, one of the highest salaries for State officers in New York.

== Personal life ==
He died on February 9, 1919; and was buried at the Albany Rural Cemetery in Menands.

== Sources ==
- Douglas-Thomson genealogy at Schenectady History
- A Compilation of Cases of Contested Elections to Seats in the Assembly of the State of New York (1899; pg. 736–760, "Douglas vs Ablett")
- HUPPUCH HAS QUIT SERVICE COMMISSION in NYT on November 7, 1912
- DOUGLAS'S SALARY IN PAWN in NYT on November 26, 1912
- CHOSEN FOR SERVICE BOARD in NYT on March 15, 1914

New York State Assembly
Preceded by George S. Rivenburgh	New York State Assembly; Albany County, 4th District; 1894	Succeeded by Amos J. Ablett
New York State Senate
Preceded by Myer Nussbaum	New York State Senate; 23rd District; 1899–1900	Succeeded by James B. McEwan
