= Michael Russell (American politician) =

American businessman and politician

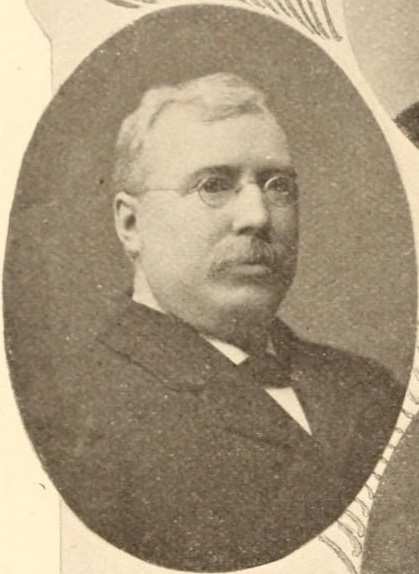
Michael Russell (1900)

Michael Russell (1844 – May 6, 1901) was an American businessman and politician from New York.

== Life ==
He was born in 1844 in Troy, Rensselaer County, New York. He attended the public schools. In 1862, he enlisted as a private in the 169th New York Volunteer Infantry, and fought in the American Civil War, being promoted eventually to the rank of brevet captain. After the war he engaged in the grocery business in Troy, and for some time was employed in the Troy Post Office.

Russell was a member of the New York State Assembly (Rensselaer Co., 3rd D.) in 1898, 1899 and 1900. He was a member of the New York State Senate (30th D.) in 1901. During the session he was stricken with apoplexy in the Senate Chamber, and was carried by his fellow senators to the Albany Hospital. On May 2, 1901, he was brought back to his home in Troy, New York, where he died four days later.

== Sources ==
New York State Assembly
| Preceded by George Anderson | New York State Assembly; Rensselaer County, 3rd District; 1898–1900 | Succeeded by Charles W. Reynolds |
New York State Senate
| Preceded by Frank M. Boyce | New York State Senate; 30th District; 1901 | Succeeded by William D. Barnes |
