= Hobart Krum =

American politician

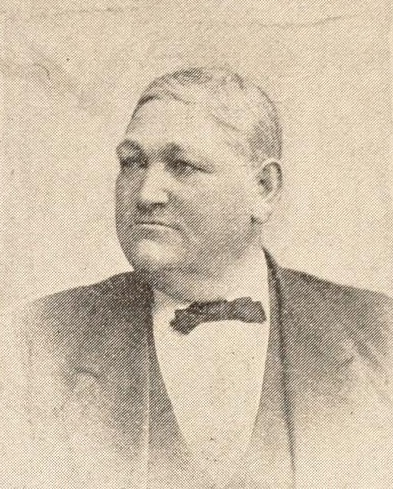
- Portrait of Krum, c. 1900

Member of the New York State Senate from the 27th district
- In office January 1, 1896 – December 31, 1902
- Preceded by: Baxter T. Smelzer
- Succeeded by: Spencer K. Warnick

Personal details
- Born: January 12, 1833 Fulton, New York, U.S.
- Died: May 4, 1914 (aged 81) Schoharie, New York, U.S.
- Party: Republican
- Spouse: Frances Washburn (died 1909)

Hobart Krum (January 12, 1833 – May 4, 1914) was an American lawyer and politician from New York.

== Life ==
He was born on January 12, 1833, in Fulton, Schoharie County, New York, the son of Jonas Krum (1790–1867) and Mary (Bixby) Krum (1793–1877). He attended the district schools, and worked on his father's farm. He graduated from the Union Free School in Chicopee Falls, Massachusetts. Then he studied law in South Worcester, was admitted to the bar in 1856, practiced for another year in South Worcester, and then settled in the village of Schoharie. He married Frances A. Washburn (1842–1909).

He was a delegate to the New York State Constitutional Convention of 1867–68; a delegate to the 1884, 1888 and 1892 Republican National Conventions; and a member of the New York State Republican Committee from 1890 to 1892.

On September 19, 1895, Krum was nominated for the State Senate by the Republican 27th senatorial district convention on the 486th ballot. He was a member of the New York State Senate (27th D.) from 1896 to 1902, sitting in the 119th, 120th, 121st, 122nd, 123rd, 124th and 125th New York State Legislatures.

He died on May 4, 1914, at his home in Schoharie, New York; and was buried at St. Paul's Lutheran Cemetery there.

== Sources ==
New York State Senate
Preceded by Baxter T. Smelzer	New York State Senate; 27th District; 1896–1902	Succeeded by Spencer K. Warnick
