= Charles F. Tupper =

American lawyer, businessman and politician (1852–1929)

Charles F. Tupper (November 8, 1852 – December 14, 1929) was an American lawyer, businessman, and politician from New York. He was a member of the New York State Assembly.

== Early life ==
Tupper was born in Kirkwood, New York on November 8, 1852, the son of Mason Ferris Tupper and Juliet Evens.

Tupper attended school at Osborne Hollow and the Old Academy in Binghamton. After he left school, he initially worked for picture-dealers U. H. Patterson & Sons. He then studied law in the law office of District Attorney Theodore F. McDonald. From 1874 to 1875, while studying law, he served as Clerk of the Board of Supervisors.

== Career ==
He was admitted to the bar in 1876, and shortly afterwards he was appointed Deputy County Clerk. In 1883, he was elected County Clerk as a Republican. He was reelected to that office for a second term, serving as County Clerk for a total of six years. At the end of his term, he founded the Security Mutual Life Association of Binghamton with Charles M. Turner. He served as its secretary until he relinquished the position to focus on his business. In 1890, he bought a photograph gallery and his picture business became a success. He was a member and secretary of the Board of Trade of Binghamton.

In 1895, Tupper was elected to the New York State Assembly as a Republican, representing the Broome County 2nd District. He served in the Assembly in 1896 (when he introduced bills to amend the provisions of the Taxation Laws related to tax equalization, establish Commercial Travelers' Home Association, provid for the manufacture and bounty payment of beat sugar, provide a fishway in the Susquehanna River, amend the Railway Law relative to the sale of franchise, and amend the Charter of Binghamton) and 1897.

When Tupper's Assembly term expired, he was appointed deputy collector of internal revenue for the Binghamton district. He served in that position for seventeen years, after which he was appointed Deputy County Clerk. He was connected with the local military organizations for fifteen years and was commissioned first lieutenant of the 20th Separate Company. When the Company was sent to Honolulu, Hawaii, Governor Frank S. Black commissioned him to organize the 120th Company to serve as Home Guard and made him captain of the Company. Theodore Roosevelt presented him with a badge for creditable service. In 1928, he was elected County Clerk.

== Personal life ==
In 1878, he married Carrie E. Landon of Vermont. Their children were Arthur W., Albert R., Charles F. Jr., Edmund, and Arleen L.

Tupper was a member of the Improved Order of Red Men, the Freemasons, the Knights of Pythias, the Binghamton Club, and the Young Men's Christian Association. He was a captain of the volunteer firemen for thirty years. He attended the Congregational Church.

Tupper died at the Binghamton City Hospital following a second operation for prostatic trouble on December 14, 1929. His funeral at the First Congregational Church was officiated by its pastor Rev. Carl A. Kallgren. He was buried in Spring Forest Cemetery.

New York State Assembly
| Preceded by District Created | New York State Assembly; Broome County, 2nd District; 1896–1897 | Succeeded by Edgar L. Vincent |
