= Joseph P. Hennessy =

American politician

Joseph P. Hennessy

Joseph P. Hennessy (ca. 1856 – April 12, 1931) was an American politician who served in the New York State Senate for a two-year term from 1901 to 1902. A Democrat, he represented The Bronx and part of Harlem in the 124th and 125th New York State Legislatures. He later served as park commissioner of The Bronx from 1918 to 1929.

Hennessy worked as newspaper reporter before passing the bar exam to become a lawyer in 1892. He then worked with former New York county clerk Henry D. Purroy before becoming secretary of New York City's Department of Street Improvements in the 23rd and 24th wards in 1893. Hennessy served as private secretary of Bronx Borough President Louis F. Haffen before running to succeed Richard H. Mitchell in the State Senate's 21st district in 1900. He won an appeal to be placed on the ballot in place of Mitchell on November 3, 1900, and he was elected on November 6. He was not renominated for reelection in 1902. In 1903, he as named assistant deputy register.

In 1918, Hennessy was appointed Bronx park commissioner. He retired in 1929.

Hennessy died at his home in the Bronx on April 12, 1931.

New York State Senate
Preceded by Richard H. Mitchell	New York State Senate; 21st District; 1901–1902	Succeeded by John A. Hawkins
