= Samuel J. Foley (politician) =

American politician

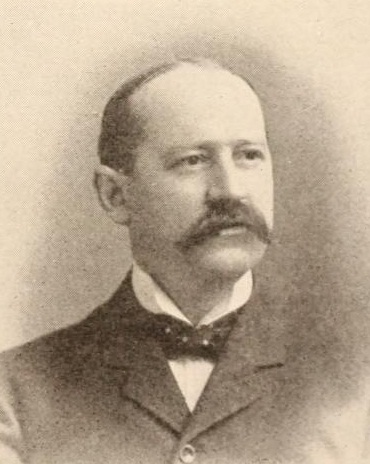
Samuel J. Foley (1902)

Samuel J. Foley (July 10, 1862 – June 25, 1922) was an American politician from New York.

== Life ==
He was born on July 10, 1862, in Canada East. The family emigrated to the United States when Samuel was still a child. He attended the public schools, and the Evening High School from 1877 to 1882. In 1876, he began to work as a buyer for a dry-goods exporting firm. Later he engaged in the real estate and insurance business.

Foley was a member of the New York State Assembly in 1891, 1892 (both New York Co., 6th D.), 1893, 1894 and 1895 (all three New York Co., 5th D.). He was Minority Leader in 1895.

He was a member of the New York State Senate (12th D.) from 1896 to 1906, sitting in the 119th, 120th, 121st, 122nd, 123rd, 124th, 125th, 126th, 127th, 128th and 129th New York State Legislatures.

He died on June 25, 1922, in a sanitarium in Central Islip, Suffolk County, New York.

His son, also named Samuel J. Foley (1891–1951), was Bronx County District Attorney from to 1933 to 1950, and a Bronx County Judge from 1950 until his death.

New York State Assembly
Preceded by Gustav Menninger	New York State Assembly; New York County, 6th District; 1891–1892	Succeeded by Moses Dinkelspiel
Preceded by Dominick F. Mullaney	New York State Assembly; New York County, 5th District; 1893–1895	Succeeded by George Gregory
Preceded by William Sulzer	Minority Leader in the New York State Assembly; 1895	Succeeded by John B. Stanchfield
New York State Senate
Preceded by Thomas C. O'Sullivan	New York State Senate; 12th District; 1896–1906	Succeeded by William Sohmer
