= John B. Judson =

American politician

John Brown Judson
- Born: August 20, 1861; Kingsborough, New York (later part of Gloversville), U.S.
- Died: October 1, 1926 (aged 65); Gloversville, New York, U.S.
- Education: Kingsborough Academy, Williston Seminary
- Occupation(s): Printer, Politician
- Known for: President of John B. Judson Printing Co.
- Spouse: Isabel Stewart (m. 1882)
- Children: Margaret Stewart, John B. Jr.
- Parent(s): Daniel Brown Judson, Phoebe E. Brown
- Relatives: Horace Sprague Judson (brother)

John Brown Judson (August 20, 1861 – October 1, 1926) was an American printer and politician from New York.

== Life ==
Judson was born on August 20, 1861, in Kingsborough, New York (later part of Gloversville), the son of glove manufacturer Daniel Brown Judson and Phoebe E. Brown. His brother was Horace Sprague Judson.

Judson attended the Kingsborough Academy and the Williston Seminary in Massachusetts. When he was 16, he became proprietor of a job-printing office in Gloversville. He developed the office into an extensive business, specializing in fine color printing and embossing. He was involved in real estate, turning a large tract of land in the eastern part of the city into a popular residential district called Judson Heights. He was a member of the Gloversville Business Men's Association and a director of the Cayadutta Electric Railroad and the Gloversville and Broadalbin Railroad. By 1924, he was president of the John B. Judson Printing Co., which had one of the largest printing plants in eastern New York. He was also president and treasurer of the Judson Heights Realty Corps. From 1913 to 1922, he served as postmaster of Gloversville.

A prominent member of the Democratic Party, Judson served as secretary and chairman of the Democratic County Committee. He was a member of the New York State Democratic Committee, and from 1894 to 1897 he was secretary of the committee. In the 1895 election, he was the Democratic candidate for New York State Comptroller. In the 1900 election, he was the Democratic candidate for the New York State Treasurer. He lost both elections.

Judson attended the Gloversville Trinity Episcopal Church. He was president of the Eccentric Club, Exalted Ruler of his Elks lodge, and a member of the Moose Lodge. In 1882, he married Isabel Stewart. Their children were Margaret Stewart and John B. Jr.

Judson died at home from a stroke of apoplexy on October 1, 1926. He was buried in Prospect Hill Cemetery in Gloversville.
