= George M. Palmer =

American politician

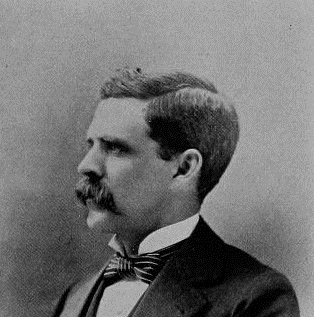
Palmer c. 1895

George M. Palmer (born September 20, 1857) was an American lawyer and politician from New York.

== Life ==
He was born on September 20, 1857, in Richmondville, Schoharie County, New York, the son of James Palmer (died 1906). He attended the public schools, and graduated from the State Normal College in 1877. He studied law, was admitted to the bar in 1882, and practiced law in Cobleskill.

Palmer was a member of the New York State Assembly (Schoharie Co.) in 1897, 1898 and 1899; and was Minority Leader in 1899.

He was again a member of the State Assembly in 1902, 1903, 1904, 1905 and 1906; and was Minority Leader from 1902 to 1906. On July 14, 1906, he married Mary Corry. On October 2, 1906, he ran for re-nomination but, because of his opposition to William Randolph Hearst, Palmer was defeated at the Democratic county convention by Charles H. Holmes.

Palmer was again a member of the State Assembly in 1908; and was Minority Leader. At the New York state election, 1908, he ran on the Democratic ticket for New York Attorney General, but was defeated by Republican Edward R. O'Malley.

On February 16, 1912, Palmer was elected as Chairman of the New York State Democratic Committee. On January 30, 1914, Palmer denied that he would step down as State Chairman. On February 19, he announced his resignation, to take effect on March 2 when William Church Osborn should be elected as his successor. At the same time he stated that he expected to be appointed as Counsel to the New York State Workmen's Compensation Commission. The deal fell through when on August 13, 1914, Jeremiah F. Connor was appointed as Counsel.

== Sources ==
New York State Assembly
| Preceded by David Enders | New York State Assembly; Schoharie County; 1897–1899 | Succeeded by Daniel D. Frisbie |
| Preceded by Daniel D. Frisbie | New York State Assembly; Schoharie County; 1902–1906 | Succeeded by Charles H. Holmes |
| Preceded by Charles H. Holmes | New York State Assembly; Schoharie County; 1908 | Succeeded by Daniel D. Frisbie |
Political offices
| Preceded by Thomas F. Donnelly | Minority Leader in the New York State Assembly; 1899 | Succeeded by J. Franklin Barnes |
| Preceded by Daniel D. Frisbie | Minority Leader in the New York State Assembly; 1902–1906 | Succeeded by James Oliver |
| Preceded by James Oliver | Minority Leader in the New York State Assembly; 1908 | Succeeded by Daniel D. Frisbie |
Party political offices
| Preceded by William S. Jackson | Democratic nominee for Attorney General of New York; 1908 | Succeeded by Thomas Carmody |
| Preceded by Norman E. Mack | Chairman of the New York State Democratic Committee; 1912–1914 | Succeeded by William Church Osborn |
