= Joseph I. Green =

American politician (1868–1939)

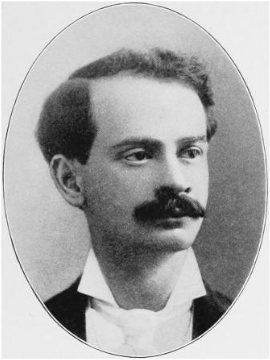

Member of the New York State Assembly
- In office 1896–1900
- Constituency: New York County, 28th District

Personal details
- Born: Joseph Isaiah Green; February 11, 1868 New York, New York, US
- Died: May 31, 1939 (aged 71) New York, New York, US
- Party: Democratic
- Spouse: Rose Hellenberg (m. 1896)
- Education: Columbia Law School; Columbia College
- Occupation: Lawyer, politician, judge

Joseph Isaiah Green (February 11, 1868 – May 31, 1939) was a Jewish-American lawyer, politician, and judge from New York.

== Life ==
Green was born on February 11, 1868, in New York City, New York, of English parents. He was the son of Israel H. Green and Ray Levett.

Green graduated from public school when he was twelve and had private tuition for four years. He then did a three-year course at Columbia Law School and Columbia College School of Political Science. He graduated in 1887 with an LL.B. from the Law School and LL.B. cum laude from the Political Science School. He was admitted to the bar when he was twenty-one and developed a large and lucrative law practice in New York City.

By 1894, Green had law offices in the Stewart Building and was chairman of the Twenty-second Assembly District Committee and a member of the Tammany Hall General Committee and his district's Committee on Organization. He was a delegate to the 1894 New York State Constitutional Convention. In 1895, he was elected to the New York State Assembly as a Democrat, representing the New York County 28th District. He served in the Assembly in 1896 (when he introduced bills that would amend commands of the Penal Code with reference to suicide, relieve New York hospitals from a water tax, require certain precautions to be made against fire, regulate the right of removal of actions in New York courts, amend the Constitution with reference to passes, make Andrew Jackson's birthday a legal holiday, and make changes to medical treatment of the sick and injured), 1897 (having run the previous election as a Democrat and Populist candidate), 1898, 1899, and 1900. He was elected Justice of the City Court, serving on the bench until the end of 1915.

Green was Jewish. He was president of the Metropolitan Hospital and Dispensary, the Hebrew Orphan Asylum, the Hebrew Infant Asylum, the Montefiore Home, Mount Sinai Hospital, the Hebrew Sheltering Guardian Society of New York, and the Cherokee Club. He was a member of the New York County Lawyers' Association, the New York State Bar Association, the Freemasons, the Knights of Pythias, and the City Club of New York. In 1896, he married Rose Hellenberg. Their children were Eleanor Constance, Dorothy Ruth, and Robert Alan.

Green died at home from a heart ailment after an illness of several months on May 31, 1939. He was buried in Acacia Cemetery.

New York State Assembly
Preceded by George W. Hamilton	New York State Assembly; New York County, 28th District; 1896–1900	Succeeded by John T. Dooling
