= Daniel Hays (New York politician) =

American politician

Daniel Hays (June 14, 1833 – June 25, 1913) was an American glove manufacturer and politician from New York.

== Life ==
Hays was born on June 14, 1833, in Scotch Bush, New York, a small settlement a few miles from Johnstown. He was the son of James Hays and Lois Dawley. His paternal grandfather, Alexander Hays, was a Scottish Highlander who immigrated to America shortly before the American Revolutionary War and fought in the war under General Washington.

Hays moved to Gloversville in 1851 and began working in the leather business. He initially worked under leading glovemaker William C. Mills, but in 1854 he began working as a manufacturer. In 1855, he became foreman for the glove factory Ward & McNab. In 1857, he moved to California for health reasons, selling goods to jobbers in San Francisco. He returned to Gloversville in 1859.

After returning to Gloversville, Hays joined his father-in-law Elias G. Ward in glove manufacturing. Two years later, he bought out Ward's interest and owned the business alone, except for a brief period in 1866 (when he worked with William H. Place). In 1890, he formed Daniel Hays & Co. with his son-in-law Lewis A. Tate. Over the years, he made a significant number of improvements to glove manufacturing, like how to dress Para deer-skins and Buenos Ayres hog-skins without difficulty. He was also a member of the Board of School Commissioners and a director of the National Fulton County Bank.

In 1897, Hays was elected to the New York State Assembly as a Republican, representing Fulton and Hamilton Counties. He served in the Assembly in 1898 and 1899.

In 1854, Hays married Helen Adelia Ward. They had one daughter, Ida Isabel, who married Lewis A. Tate. Helen died in 1899, and he later married Mary Graham of Philadelphia. He was a member and trustee of the First Methodist Episcopal Church for over half a century. He was a trustee of Syracuse University and Troy Conference Academy. He served as president of the Gloversville Free Library and the Nathan Littauer Hospital board. He was a member of the Freemasons and the Sons of the American Revolution.

Hays died at home on June 25, 1913. He was buried in the Hays family mausoleum in Prospect Hill.

New York State Assembly
Preceded by Byron D. Brown	New York State Assembly; Fulton and Hamilton Counties; 1898–1899	Succeeded by William Harris
