= Louis Munzinger =

American politician (1851–1916)

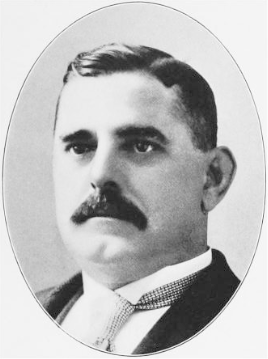
Munzinger c. 1899

Louis Munzinger (November 25, 1851 – May 20, 1916) was an American businessman and politician from New York.

== Life ==
Louis Munzinger was born in New York City on (November 25, 1851. He graduated from Grammar School No. 45. Then he engaged in bottling mineral water.

He was a port warden of the Port of New York from 1892 to 1895; and a member of the New York State Senate (16th D.) from 1896 to 1900, sitting in the 119th, 120th, 121st, 122nd, 123rd New York State Legislatures.

He was City Marshal for the collection of arrears in personal taxes from before 1903 until after 1907.

He died on May 20, 1916.

== Sources ==
- The New York Red Book compiled by Edgar L. Murlin (published by James B. Lyon, Albany NY, 1897; pp. 163, 404)
- "For Consolation Prizes" in The New York Times on December 27, 1903
- "Fees Illegal, Says Ellison" in The New York Times on April 13, 1907

New York State Senate
Preceded by Clarence Lexow	New York State Senate; 16th District; 1896–1900	Succeeded by Patrick F. Trainor
