= Thomas F. Donnelly (New York City) =

American politician

Thomas Frederick Donnelly
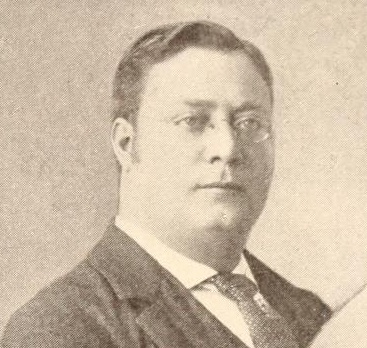
- Thomas F. Donnelly in 1902

Justice of the New York Supreme Court, 1st District
- In office 1913–1924

Justice of the City Court of New York City
- In office 1908–1912

Member of the New York Senate from the 20th district
- In office 1899–1902
- Preceded by: Jacob A. Cantor
- Succeeded by: James J. Frawley

Member of the New York State Assembly from the 32nd New York County district
- In office 1896–1898
- Succeeded by: John Poth, Jr.

Personal details
- Born: December 13, 1863 New York City, New York, United States
- Died: November 1, 1924 (aged 60)
- Parents: Thomas Lester Donnelly (father); Sarah (Williams) Donnelly (mother)

Thomas F. Donnelly (née Thomas Frederick Donnelly; December 13, 1863 – November 1, 1924) was an American lawyer, judge and politician from New York.

== Life ==
He was born on December 13, 1863, in New York City, the son of Thomas Lester Donnelly, manager of the Grand Opera House, and Sarah (Williams) Donnelly. He attended the public schools and City College of New York. He graduated from Columbia Law School in 1884, was admitted to the bar, and practiced law in New York City.

Donnelly was a member of the New York State Assembly (New York Co., 32nd D.) in 1896, 1897 and 1898; and was Minority Leader in 1898.

He was a member of the New York State Senate (20th D.) from 1899 to 1902, sitting in the 122nd, 123rd, 124th and 125th New York State Legislatures.

He was a justice of the City Court from 1908 to 1912; and a justice of the New York Supreme Court (1st D.) from 1913 until his death in 1924.

Actress Dorothy Donnelly (1880–1928) was his sister.

== Sources ==
New York State Assembly
Preceded by new district	New York State Assembly; New York County, 32nd District; 1896–1898	Succeeded by John Poth, Jr.
Political offices
Preceded by Daniel E. Finn	Minority Leader in the New York State Assembly; 1898	Succeeded by George M. Palmer
New York State Senate
Preceded by Jacob A. Cantor	New York State Senate; 20th District; 1899–1902	Succeeded by James J. Frawley
