= Charles E. Walker =

American politician

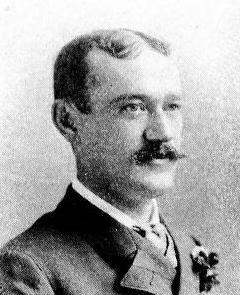
Charles E. Walker (1893)

Charles Edward Walker (March 11, 1860 in Corning, Steuben County, New York – June 6, 1893 in Corning, Steuben Co., NY) was an American politician from New York.

== Life ==
He was the son of Congressman Charles C. B. Walker (1824–1888). He attended Corning Free Academy, and during one year Hamilton College. Then he engaged in horse and cattle breeding on a farm in Palmyra; and in the lumber business.

In November 1891, he lost the senatorial election to his Republican opponent Franklin D. Sherwood, but Sherwood was declared ineligible for being Park Commissioner of Hornellsville, and Walker was seated by a vote of the Democratic majority of the State Senate. He was a member of the New York State Senate (27th D.) in 1892 and 1893. He died about six weeks after the end of the session, on June 6, 1893, at his home in Corning, from a "spinal affection".

== Sources ==
- The New York Red Book compiled by Edgar L. Murlin (published by James B. Lyon, Albany NY, 1897; pg. 404)
- New York State Legislative Souvenir for 1893 with Portraits of the Members of Both Houses by Henry P. Phelps (pg. 19f)
- State Senator Walker Seriously Ill in NYT on June 7, 1893
- Pioneer Days and Later Times in Corning and Vicinity 1789 – 1920 bu Uri Mulford (pg. 326)

New York State Senate
Preceded by Jacob Sloat Fassett	New York State Senate; 27th District; 1892–1893	Succeeded by Baxter T. Smelzer
