= Marvin I. Greenwood =

American lawyer and politician

Marvin I. Greenwood (January 31, 1840 – December 27, 1917) was an American lawyer and politician from Wayne County, New York.

== Life ==
Greenwood was born on January 31, 1840, near Chittenango, New York, the son of Ira Greenwood, a farmer and carpenter, and Clarissa M. Mosley.

Greenwood moved with his family to Marion a few months after he was born. The family moved to Palmyra in 1845 and again to Arcadia in 1855. He attended common schools, the Walworth Academy, and the Newark Union Free School and Academy. He left the family farm to read law in the office of L. M. Norton in Newark, and in 1868 he was admitted to the bar. He continued working in Norton's office after Norton was elected County Judge and Surrogate in 1869, although in 1875 he began his own law practice. A steadfast Republican, he served as justice of the peace for several terms and was District Attorney of Wayne County from 1877 to 1879.

In 1897, Greenwood was elected to the New York State Assembly as a Republican, representing Wayne County. He served in the Assembly in 1898, 1899, and 1910.

Greenwood first joined the Freemasons in 1865 and served in various state and local positions for the Freemasons, the Royal Arch Masons, the Knights Templar, and the Scottish Rite. He was also a charter member of the First Baptist Church of Newark as well as its Senior Deacon, clerk, and Sunday School teacher. In 1862, he married Laura F. Wadsworth of Phelps. Their children were Frank M. and William W. He outlived Laura and their children. In 1902, he married Lillian Johnson.

Greenwood died at home on December 27, 1917. Former pastors Rev. John C. Brookins and Rev. John C. MacFarlane officiated the funeral service at the Baptist Church, and former Grand High Priest of the Grand Chapter of the State of New York Dr. Jared A. Reed conducted the service. The honorary pallbearers were members of the Royal Arch Masons, and the actual pallbearers consisted of members from the church, the lodge, and the Bar Association. He was buried in Willow Avenue Cemetery.

New York State Assembly
Preceded by George S. Horton	New York State Assembly; Wayne County; 1898–1899	Succeeded by Frederick W. Griffith
Preceded by Edson W. Hamn	New York State Assembly; Wayne County; 1910	Succeeded by Albert Yeomans
