= Byron D. Brown =

American businessman and politician

Member of the New York State Assembly
- In office 1896–1897
- Constituency: Fulton and Hamilton Counties

Personal details
- Born: August 4, 1854 Broadalbin, New York, United States
- Died: October 4, 1929 Mayfield, New York, United States
- Party: Republican
- Spouse: Elizabeth A. Griffis (m. 1884)
- Occupation: Glove manufacturer, politician

Byron D. Brown (August 4, 1854 – October 4, 1929) was an American glove manufacturer and politician from New York.

== Life ==
Brown was born on August 4, 1854, in Broadalbin, New York, the son of Isaac Brown, a paper manufacturer, and Laura M. Smith. He grew up on the family farm, and moved to Mayfield in 1876. In 1881, he began manufacturing gloves, and owned a large factory near the village of Mayfield. He also owned the village drug store.

Brown served as town clerk, justice of the peace, and town supervisor. In 1895, he was elected to the New York State Assembly as a Republican, representing Fulton and Hamilton Counties. He served in the Assembly in 1896 and 1897. After his term expired, he was named collector for Internal Revenue. In 1917, he became Commissioner of Jurors of Fulton County. He held this office when he died.

In 1884, Brown married Elizabeth A. Griffis of Gloversville. They had no children. He was a member of the Freemasons, the Royal Arch Masonry, and the Odd Fellows. He was a member of the Mayfield Presbyterian church.

Brown died at home on October 4, 1929, less than a month after his wife's death. He was buried in the family plot in the Mayfield cemetery.

New York State Assembly
Preceded by Philip Keck	New York State Assembly; Fulton and Hamilton Counties; 1896–1897	Succeeded by Daniel Hays (New York politician)
