= 122nd New York State Legislature =

New York state legislative session

←	121st	123rd	→
- New York State Capitol (2009)

Overview
- Legislative body: New York State Legislature
- Jurisdiction: New York, United States
- Term: January 1 – December 31, 1899

Senate
- Members: 50
- President: Lt. Gov. Timothy L. Woodruff (R)
- Temporary President: Timothy E. Ellsworth (R)
- Party control: Republican (27-23)

Assembly
- Members: 150
- Speaker: S. Frederick Nixon (R)
- Party control: Republican (88-62)

Sessions
- 1st: January 4 – April 28, 1899

The 122nd New York State Legislature, consisting of the New York State Senate and the New York State Assembly, met from January 4 to April 28, 1899, during the first year of Theodore Roosevelt's governorship, in Albany.

== Background ==
Under the provisions of the New York Constitution of 1894, 50 Senators and 150 assemblymen were elected in single-seat districts; senators for a two-year term, assemblymen for a one-year term. The senatorial districts were made up of entire counties, except New York County (twelve districts), Kings County (seven districts), Erie County (three districts) and Monroe County (two districts). The Assembly districts were made up of contiguous area, all within the same county.

At this time there were two major political parties: the Republican Party and the Democratic Party. The Socialist Labor Party, the Prohibition Party and the Citizens Union also nominated tickets.

== Elections ==
The 1898 New York state election was held on November 8. Theodore Roosevelt was elected Governor; and Lt. Gov. Timothy L. Woodruff was re-elected; both Republicans. The other five statewide elective office up for election were also carried by the Republicans. The approximate party strength at this election, as expressed by the vote for Governor, was: Republican 662,000; Democratic 644,000; Socialist Labor 24,000; Prohibition 18,000; and Citizens Union 2,000.

== Sessions ==
The Legislature met for the regular session at the State Capitol in Albany on January 4, 1899; and adjourned on April 28.

S. Frederick Nixon (R) was elected Speaker.

Timothy E. Ellsworth (R) was re-elected President pro tempore of the State Senate.

On January 17, the Legislature elected Chauncey M. Depew (R) to succeed Edward Murphy Jr. (D) as U.S. Senator from New York, for a six-year term beginning on March 4, 1899.

== State Senate ==
=== Districts ===
- 1st District: Richmond and Suffolk counties
- 2nd District: Queens County
- 3rd District: 1st, 2nd, 3rd, 4th, 5th and 6th Ward of Brooklyn, as constituted in 1894
- 4th District: 7th, 13th, 19th and 21st Ward of Brooklyn, as constituted in 1894
- 5th District: 8th, 10th, 12th and 30th Ward of Brooklyn, and the annexed former Town of Gravesend, as constituted in 1894
- 6th District: 9th, 11th, 20th and 22nd Ward of Brooklyn, as constituted in 1894
- 7th District: 14th, 15th, 16th and 17th Ward of Brooklyn, as constituted in 1894
- 8th District: 23rd, 24th, 25th and 29th Ward of Brooklyn; and the annexed former Town of Flatlands, as constituted in 1894
- 9th District: 18th, 26th, 27th and 28th Ward of Brooklyn, as constituted in 1894
- 10th, 11th, 12th, 13th, 14th, 15th, 16th, 17th, 18th, 19th, 20th and 21st District: Parts of the City of New York, defined geographically by their bordering streets, regardless of Wards or Assembly districts
- 22nd District: Westchester County
- 23rd District: Orange and Rockland counties
- 24th District: Columbia, Dutchess and Putnam and counties
- 25th District: Greene and Ulster counties
- 26th District: Chenango, Delaware and Sullivan counties
- 27th District: Fulton, Hamilton, Montgomery and Schoharie counties
- 28th District: Saratoga, Schenectady and Washington counties
- 29th District: Albany County
- 30th District: Rensselaer County
- 31st District: Clinton, Essex and Warren counties
- 32nd District: Franklin and St. Lawrence counties
- 33rd District: Otsego and Herkimer counties
- 34th District: Oneida County
- 35th District: Jefferson and Lewis counties
- 36th District: Onondaga County
- 37th District: Oswego and Madison counties
- 38th District: Broome, Cortland and Tioga counties
- 39th District: Cayuga and Seneca counties
- 40th District: Chemung, Schuyler and Tompkins counties
- 41st District: Steuben and Yates counties
- 42nd District: Ontario and Wayne counties
- 43rd District: 4th, 6th, 7th, 8th, 12th, 13th, 14th, 16th, 17th and 18th Ward of Rochester; and the towns of Brighton, Henrietta, Irondequoit, Menden, Penfield, Perinton, Pittsford, Rush and Webster, in Monroe County
- 44th District: 1st, 2nd, 3rd, 5th, 9th, 10th, 11th, 15th, 19th and 20th Ward of Rochester; and the towns of Chili, Clarkson, Gates, Greece, Hamlin, Ogden, Parma, Riga, Sweden and Wheatland, in Monroe County
- 45th District: Genesee, Niagara and Orleans counties
- 46th District: Allegany, Livingston and Wyoming counties
- 47th District: 1st, 2nd, 3rd, 6th, 15th, 19th, 20th, 21st, 22nd, 23rd and 24th Ward of Buffalo
- 48th District: 4th, 5th, 7th, 8th, 9th, 10th, 11th, 12th, 13th, 14th and 16th Ward of Buffalo
- 49th District: 17th, 18th and 25th Ward of the City of Buffalo; and all area in Erie County outside Buffalo
- 50th District: Cattaraugus and Chautauqua counties

Note: In 1897, New York County (the boroughs of Manhattan and Bronx), Kings County (the borough of Brooklyn), Richmond County (the borough of Staten Island) and the Western part of Queens County (the borough of Queens) were consolidated into the present-day City of New York. The Eastern part of Queens County (the non-consolidated part) was separated in 1899 as Nassau County. Parts of the 1st and 2nd Assembly districts of Westchester County were annexed by New York City in 1895, and became part of the Borough of the Bronx in 1898.

=== Members ===
The asterisk (*) denotes members of the previous Legislature who continued in office as members of this Legislature. Thomas H. Cullen, David Floyd Davis, Henry Marshall, Thomas F. Donnelly, Richard H. Mitchell, William J. Graney, Louis F. Goodsell and William W. Armstrong changed from the Assembly to the Senate.

District	Senator	Party	Notes
1st	John L. Havens	Democrat	
2nd	James Norton	Democrat	
3rd	Thomas H. Cullen*	Democrat	
4th	David Floyd Davis*	Republican	
5th	Michael J. Coffey*	Democrat	re-elected
6th	William J. La Roche	Democrat	
7th	Patrick H. McCarren*	Democrat	re-elected
8th	Henry Marshall*	Republican	
9th	Joseph Wagner	Democrat	
10th	John F. Ahearn*	Democrat	re-elected
11th	Timothy D. Sullivan*	Democrat	re-elected
12th	Samuel J. Foley*	Democrat	re-elected
13th	Bernard F. Martin*	Democrat	re-elected
14th	Thomas F. Grady*	Democrat	re-elected; Minority Leader
15th	Nathaniel A. Elsberg	Republican	
16th	Louis Munzinger*	Democrat	re-elected
17th	George W. Plunkitt	Democrat	
18th	Maurice Featherson*	Democrat	re-elected
19th	John Ford*	Republican	re-elected
20th	Thomas F. Donnelly*	Democrat	
21st	Richard H. Mitchell*	Democrat	
22nd	William J. Graney*	Democrat	
23rd	Louis F. Goodsell*	Republican	
24th	Henry S. Ambler	Republican	
25th	Jacob Rice	Democrat	
26th	William L. Thornton	Republican	
27th	Hobart Krum*	Republican	re-elected
28th	Edgar T. Brackett*	Republican	re-elected
29th	Curtis N. Douglas	Democrat	
30th	Frank M. Boyce	Democrat	
31st	George Chahoon*	Republican	re-elected
32nd	George R. Malby*	Republican	re-elected
33rd	James D. Feeter	Republican	
34th	Henry J. Coggeshall*	Republican	re-elected
35th	Elon R. Brown*	Republican	re-elected
36th	Horace White*	Republican	re-elected
37th	Nevada N. Stranahan*	Republican	re-elected
38th	William Elting Johnson*	Republican	re-elected
39th	Benjamin M. Wilcox*	Republican	re-elected
40th	Charles T. Willis	Republican	
41st	Franklin D. Sherwood	Republican	
42nd	John Raines*	Republican	re-elected
43rd	Cornelius R. Parsons*	Republican	re-elected
44th	William W. Armstrong*	Republican	
45th	Timothy E. Ellsworth*	Republican	re-elected; re-elected President pro tempore
46th	Lester H. Humphrey*	Republican	re-elected
47th	William F. Mackey	Democrat	
48th	Samuel J. Ramsperger	Democrat	
49th	George Allen Davis*	Republican	re-elected
50th	Frank W. Higgins*	Republican	re-elected

=== Employees ===
- Clerk: James S. Whipple
- Sergeant-at-Arms: Henry Jacquilard
- Doorkeeper: John E. Gorss
- Stenographer: A. B. Sackett

== State Assembly ==
=== Assemblymen ===
District		Assemblymen	Party	Notes
Albany	1st	William L. Coughtry*	Republican	
Albany	2nd	James B. McEwan*	Republican	
Albany	3rd	George T. Kelly*	Democrat	
Albany	4th	Henry M. Sage	Republican	
Allegany		Almanzo W. Litchard*	Republican	
Broome	1st	James T. Rogers	Republican	
Broome	2nd	Edgar L. Vincent*	Republican	
Cattaraugus	1st	George A. Stoneman*	Republican	
Cattaraugus	2nd	Albert T. Fancher	Republican	
Cayuga	1st	Elias Q. Dutton*	Republican	
Cayuga	2nd	George S. Fordyce*	Republican	
Chautauqua	1st	J. Samuel Fowler	Republican	
Chautauqua	2nd	S. Frederick Nixon*	Republican	elected Speaker
Chemung		David N. Heller	Democrat	
Chenango		Jotham P. Allds*	Republican	Majority Leader
Clinton		Edmund J. Pickett*	Democrat	
Columbia		Lester J. Bashford	Democrat	
Cortland		George S. Sands	Republican	
Delaware		Delos Axtell*	Republican	
Dutchess	1st	John T. Smith	Republican	
Dutchess	2nd	William A. Tripp*	Republican	
Erie	1st	Anthony J. Boland*	Democrat	
Erie	2nd	Henry W. Hill*	Republican	
Erie	3rd	Anthony P. Barrett	Democrat	
Erie	4th	John C. Mohring*	Democrat	
Erie	5th	Henry Streifler*	Democrat	
Erie	6th	Michael J. Kane	Democrat	
Erie	7th	John K. Patton*	Republican	
Erie	8th	E. Freeman Baker*	Republican	
Essex		Orlando Beede	Republican	
Franklin		Thomas A. Sears*	Republican	
Fulton and Hamilton		Daniel Hays*	Republican	
Genesee		John J. Ellis*	Republican	
Greene		D. Geroe Green	Republican	
Herkimer		Erwin E. Kelley	Republican	
Jefferson	1st	Morgan Bryan	Republican	
Jefferson	2nd	Charles O. Roberts	Republican	
Kings	1st	William L. Sandford	Republican	
Kings	2nd	John McKeown*	Democrat	
Kings	3rd	James J. McInerney	Democrat	
Kings	4th	Charles H. Cotton	Republican	
Kings	5th	Abram C. DeGraw*	Republican	
Kings	6th	Valentine J. Riedman	Democrat	
Kings	7th	Francis P. Gallagher*	Democrat	
Kings	8th	Thomas J. Farrell*	Democrat	
Kings	9th	John J. Cain*	Democrat	
Kings	10th	Edward L. Collier	Republican	
Kings	11th	Joseph A. Guider*	Democrat	
Kings	12th	Charles C. Schoeneck*	Democrat	
Kings	13th	George Siems	Democrat	
Kings	14th	August F. Schmid*	Democrat	
Kings	15th	Charles Juengst	Democrat	
Kings	16th	Edward C. Brennan*	Republican	
Kings	17th	Harris Wilson	Republican	
Kings	18th	Henry A. Ball	Democrat	
Kings	19th	Frederick Schmid*	Democrat	
Kings	20th	Joseph Wingenfeld	Democrat	
Kings	21st	Herman H. Torborg	Democrat	
Lewis		Addison L. Clark*	Republican	
Livingston		Otto Kelsey*	Republican	
Madison		Robert J. Fish*	Republican	
Monroe	1st	Merton E. Lewis	Republican	
Monroe	2nd	Adolph J. Rodenbeck	Republican	
Monroe	3rd	Richard Gardiner	Republican	
Monroe	4th	Benjamin F. Gleason	Republican	
Montgomery		Richard Murphy*	Republican	
New York	1st	Daniel E. Finn*	Democrat	on November 7, 1899, elected to the Municipal Court
New York	2nd	James A. Rierdon	Democrat	
New York	3rd	Michael T. Sharkey	Democrat	
New York	4th	Patrick H. Roche*	Democrat	
New York	5th	Nelson H. Henry	Republican	
New York	6th	Timothy P. Sullivan*	Democrat	
New York	7th	John F. Maher*	Democrat	
New York	8th	Charles S. Adler*	Republican	
New York	9th	N. Taylor Phillips*	Democrat	
New York	10th	Julius Harburger*	Democrat	
New York	11th	John J. O'Connor*	Democrat	
New York	12th	Leon Sanders	Democrat	
New York	13th	Patrick F. Trainor*	Democrat	
New York	14th	Louis Meister	Democrat	
New York	15th	James E. Smith	Democrat	
New York	16th	Benjamin Hoffman*	Democrat	
New York	17th	John F. Brennan*	Democrat	
New York	18th	Charles P. Dillon*	Democrat	
New York	19th	Robert Mazet	Republican	
New York	20th	Cornelius F. Collins*	Democrat	
New York	21st	Edward H. Fallows	Republican	
New York	22nd	Joseph Baum	Democrat	
New York	23rd	Thomas A. Mangin	Democrat	
New York	24th	John B. Fitzgerald*	Democrat	
New York	25th	Frederick A. Ware	Republican	
New York	26th	John J. O'Connell	Democrat	
New York	27th	Gherardi Davis	Republican	
New York	28th	Joseph I. Green*	Democrat	
New York	29th	Frank Bulkley	Republican	
New York	30th	George W. Meyer Jr.*	Democrat	
New York	31st	Samuel S. Slater	Republican	
New York	32nd	John Poth Jr.	Democrat	
New York	33rd	John J. Egan*	Democrat	
New York	34th	Lyman W. Redington*	Democrat	
New York	35th	George J. Grossman	Democrat	
Niagara	1st	John T. Darrison	Republican	
Niagara	2nd	Jay S. Rowe	Republican	
Oneida	1st	William J. Sullivan	Democrat	
Oneida	2nd	Louis M. Martin*	Republican	
Oneida	3rd	John E. Mason*	Republican	
Onondaga	1st	William G. Cottle*	Republican	
Onondaga	2nd	Edward G. Ten Eyck*	Republican	
Onondaga	3rd	Edward B. Sabine	Republican	
Onondaga	4th	John T. Delaney*	Republican	
Ontario		Jean L. Burnett	Republican	
Orange	1st	James G. Graham	Republican	
Orange	2nd	Louis Bedell	Republican	
Orleans		Dennis W. Evarts*	Republican	
Oswego	1st	Thomas D. Lewis	Republican	
Oswego	2nd	Thomas M. Costello*	Republican	
Otsego		Leland M. Cowles*	Republican	
Putnam		Adrian H. Dean	Democrat	
Queens	1st	Charles C. Wissel	Democrat	
Queens	2nd	Cyrus B. Gale*	Democrat	
Queens	3rd	George W. Doughty	Republican	
Rensselaer	1st	Benjamin O. Brewster*	Republican	
Rensselaer	2nd	William Hutton Jr.*	Democrat	
Rensselaer	3rd	Michael Russell*	Republican	
Richmond		Charles J. Kullman*	Democrat	
Rockland		Irving Brown*	Democrat	
St. Lawrence	1st	Ira C. Miles*	Republican	
St. Lawrence	2nd	Benjamin A. Babcock	Republican	
Saratoga		George H. West	Republican	
Schenectady		Andrew J. McMillan	Republican	
Schoharie		George M. Palmer*	Democrat	Minority Leader
Schuyler		Charles A. Sloane*	Republican	
Seneca		Moses C. Gould	Democrat	
Steuben	1st	Edward D. Cross*	Republican	
Steuben	2nd	Hyatt C. Hatch*	Republican	
Suffolk	1st	Joseph N. Hallock	Republican	
Suffolk	2nd	Regis H. Post	Republican	
Sullivan		Clarence A. Sprague	Republican	
Tioga		Daniel P. Witter*	Republican	
Tompkins		Theron Johnson*	Republican	
Ulster	1st	Robert A. Snyder	Republican	
Ulster	2nd	Solomon P. Thorn	Republican	
Warren		Charles H. Hitchcock	Republican	
Washington		Charles R. Paris*	Republican	
Wayne		Marvin I. Greenwood*	Republican	
Westchester	1st	John J. Sloane	Democrat	
Westchester	2nd	William Henderson Jr.	Democrat	
Westchester	3rd	James K. Apgar	Republican	
Wyoming		Daniel P. Whipple*	Republican	
Yates		Edward M. Sawyer	Republican	

=== Employees ===
- Clerk: Archie E. Baxter
- Assistant Clerk; Ray B. Smith
- Sergeant-at-Arms: James C. Crawford
- Doorkeeper: Frank W. Johnston
- First Assistant Doorkeeper: William H. Craig
- Second Assistant Doorkeeper: Charles R. Hotaling
- Stenographer: Henry C. Lammert

== Sources ==
- Official New York from Cleveland to Hughes by Charles Elliott Fitch (Hurd Publishing Co., New York and Buffalo, 1911, Vol. IV; see pg. 340f for assemblymen; and 364 for senators)
- THE NEW LEGISLATURE in NYT on November 9, 1898
- THE NEXT LEGISLATURE; Revised Returns... in NYT on November 10, 1898
- CAUCUSES OF LEGISLATORS in NYT on January 4, 1899
- WORK OF THE ASSEMBLY in NYT on January 5, 1899
