= William H. Wait =

American politician

William H. Wait (July 26, 1842 – February 15, 1902) was an American politician from New York.

== Life ==
William was born on July 26, 1842, in Hoosick, New York, the only child of cotton manufacturer Nathan Wait and Maria Bowers. The Wait family moved to Hector, where Nathan served for a number of years as justice of the peace and justice of sessions.

After attending Professor Gillett's school in Peach Orchard and the Rochester Business School, William returned to the family farm in Hector. He stayed in Hector until 1881, when he moved to Watkins Glen.

William was founder and president of the Farmers & Merchants' Bank in Watkins, founder and senior partner of carriage and harness manufacturer Chase & Co. Watkins, and owner of two large fruit farms on the shores of Seneca Lake. In 1873, William was elected Treasurer of Schuyler County, and was re-elected to the position in 1876 and 1888. In 1887 and 1888, he served as town supervisor of Dix.

In the 1880 presidential election, William was a presidential elector for President James A. Garfield and Vice-President Chester A. Arthur.

In 1891, William was elected to the New York State Assembly as a Republican, representing Schuyler County. He served in the Assembly in 1892 and 1893.

In 1900, Governor Theodore Roosevelt appointed William Commissioner of Watkins Glen State Reservation. Before his death, he was on the board of education and the board of water and sewer commissioners. He was a freemason.

William married Mary E. Wickham in 1872. Their four children were George C., Esther W., Robert D., and William B. George was also elected Treasurer of Schuyler County and became president of the Farmers & Merchants' Bank after his father's death.

William died on February 15, 1902, from heart failure at home. He was buried at Glenwood Cemetery in Watkins Glen.

New York State Assembly
Preceded by Charles T. Willis	New York State Assembly; Schuyler County; 1892-1893	Succeeded by George A. Snyder
