= Fred A. Robbins =

American politician (1858–1941)

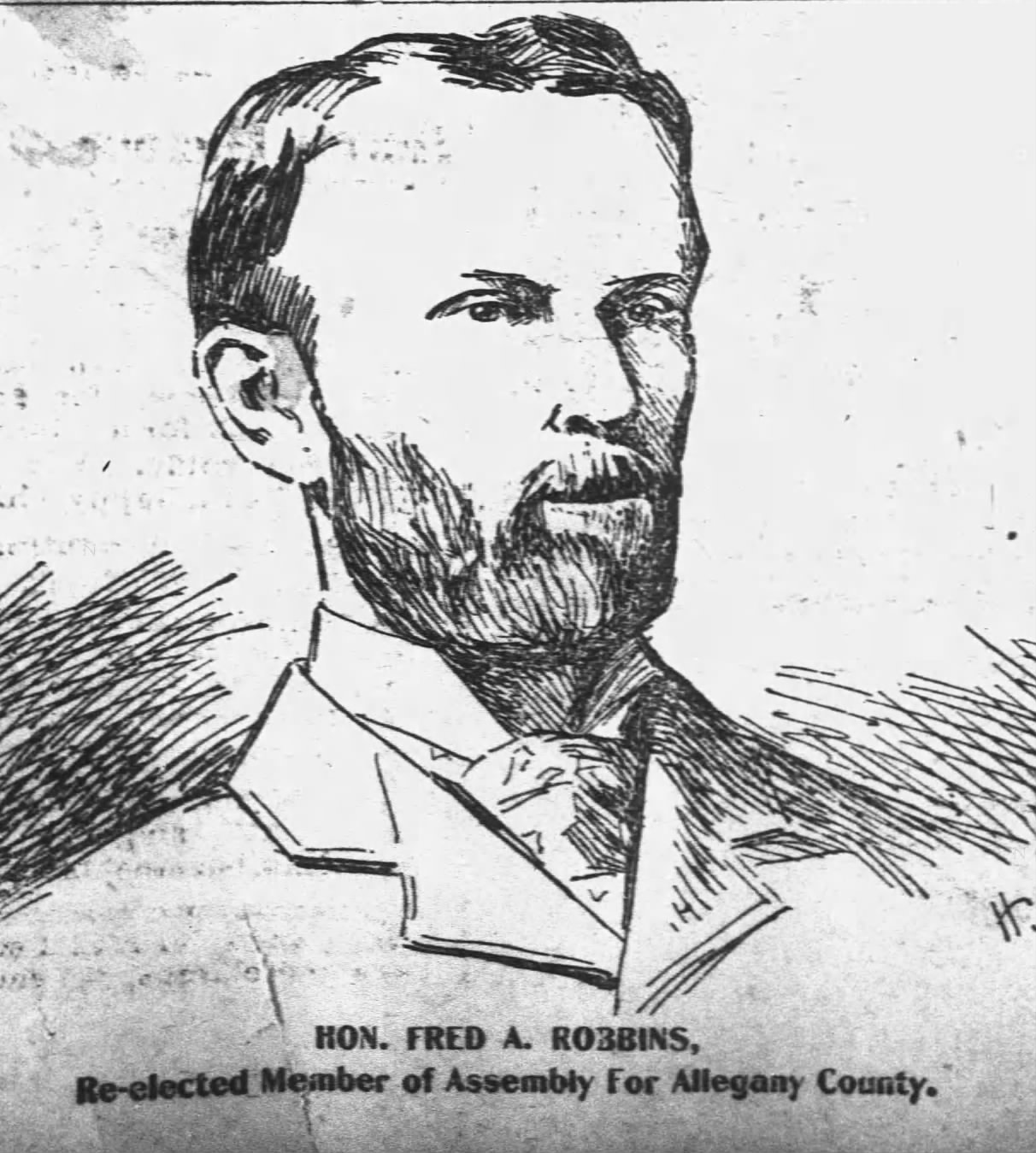
Fred A. Robbins

Frederick A. Robbins (October 16, 1858 – January 28, 1941) was an American politician who served in the New York State Assembly for four terms from 1894 to 1897 and was mayor of Hornell, New York from 1919 to 1923.

== Life ==
Robbins was born in Bainbridge, New York, before moving with his parents to Angelica, New York when he was 8 years old. He became an attorney in 1880 and practiced law in Belfast, New York before returning to Angelica in 1881. He joined the Steuben County Board of Supervisors in 1888, eventually becoming the board's chair.

In September 1893, Robbins was nominated by the Allegany County Republican Party for the New York State Assembly. He won election that November, and was re-elected in 1894, 1895, and 1896. His nomination in 1895 was the first time in 40 years an assemblyman from New York had been nominated for a third term.

While running for a fourth term, Robbins lost the Republican nomination to Grant Duke at the Allegany County Republican Convention on August 8, 1896. Later that month, a second convention was called to renominate Robbins after 3,000 residents signed a petition to call for another convention. He secured the nomination on August 21 after Duke's nomination was declared fraudulent.

Robbins served as chair of the Committee on Codes and Judiciary Committee during his time in the Assembly.

He lost the Republican nomination to Almanzo W. Litchard in 1897. Robbins then left politics to open a law firm in Hornellsville, New York, and later practiced law in Rochester and Hornell.

In 1906, he was named to the Hornell's Board of Public Safety. In 1919, he was elected the town's mayor after defeating Frank J. Nelson in the November election, serving until 1923. He later became Hornell's city attorney in 1928.

Robbins died on January 28, 1941.

New York State Assembly
Preceded by Marcus M. Congdon	New York State Assembly; Allegany County; 1894-1897	Succeeded by Almanzo W. Litchard
