= Frank M. Boyce =

American physician and politician

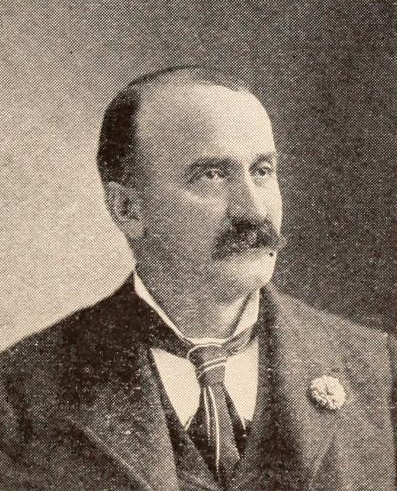
- Portrait of Boyce, c. 1900

Member of the New York State Senate
- In office January 1, 1907 – December 31, 1908
- Preceded by: James B. McEwan
- Succeeded by: Victor M. Allen
- Constituency: 29th district
- In office January 1, 1899 – December 31, 1900
- Preceded by: LeGrand C. Tibbits
- Succeeded by: Michael Russell
- Constituency: 30th district

Member of the New York State Assembly from the 2nd Saratoga County district
- In office January 1, 1890 – December 31, 1890
- Preceded by: George S. Batcheller
- Succeeded by: Lewis Varney

Personal details
- Born: Frank Marcellus Boyce; August 3, 1851 Schodack, New York, U.S.
- Died: 1931 (aged 79–80)
- Party: Democratic
- Spouses: Kate Payne (m. 1874; died 1889); Emma Van Buren (m. 1896)
- Education: Albany Medical College (MD)

Frank Marcellus Boyce (August 3, 1851 – 1931) was an American physician and Senator from New York.

== Life ==
He was born on August 3, 1851, in Schodack, Rensselaer County, New York, the son of Anson Mead Boyce (1828–1878) and Caroline (Stewart) Boyce (1833–1889). He attended the public schools in Saratoga Springs. He graduated from Albany Medical College in 1872, was licensed to practice medicine by the Columbia University College of Physicians and Surgeons in 1873, and practiced medicine in Saratoga Springs. On February 5, 1874, he married Kate Payne (1852–1889), and they had three children.

He was Coroner of Saratoga County from 1878 to 1881; a trustee of the Village of Saratoga Springs from 1881 to 1888; Supervisor of the Town of Saratoga Springs in 1889; and a member of the New York State Assembly (Saratoga Co., 2nd D.) in 1890.

In 1891, he returned to Schodack where he lived on a farm and practiced medicine. On August 9, 1896, he married Emma Van Buren (1857–1935). He was Supervisor of the Town of Schodack in 1896; and a member of the New York State Senate (30th D.) in 1899 and 1900.

He was again a member of the State Senate (29th D.) in 1907 and 1908.

He died in 1931; and was buried at the Woodlawn Cemetery in Schodack, New York.

== Legacy ==
His son, Frank Marcellus Boyce, Jr., wrote a book on Women's Suffrage in 1913. The book is titled Governor Jane: a story of the new woman.

== Sources ==
New York State Assembly
Preceded by George S. Batcheller	New York State Assembly; Saratoga County, 2nd District; 1890	Succeeded by Lewis Varney
New York State Senate
Preceded by LeGrand C. Tibbits	New York State Senate; 30th District; 1899–1900	Succeeded by Michael Russell
Preceded by James B. McEwan	New York State Senate; 29th District; 1907–1908	Succeeded by Victor M. Allen
