= Frank C. Wood =

American lawyer and politician

Frank C. Wood (September 29, 1872 – February 19, 1912) was an American lawyer and politician from New York.

== Life ==
Wood was born on September 29, 1872, in Webster City, Iowa. His father was an early and respected settler of the city. After his father died when he was very young, he moved to New York with his mother. He spent much of his life in Gloversville.

After finishing public school, Wood worked in the glove business and a drug store in Gloversville. He then attended Fairfield Seminary, graduating from there in 1899. After graduating, he studied law and was admitted to the bar. In the 1902 Mountain Lake railroad wreck that killed 14 people, he was injured and his left leg was amputated above the knee.

In 1899, Wood was elected City Recorder of Gloversville by 25 votes. He was re-elected in 1901. In 1903, he was elected to the New York State Assembly as a Republican, representing Fulton and Hamilton Counties. He served in the Assembly in 1904 and 1905. Afterwards, he formed the law firm Wood & Maider with Wesley H. Maider.

Wood was a district deputy of the Elks, a prominent position in the order, and was a member of the Order of United American Mechanics, the Ancient Order of Foresters, the Independent Order of Red Men, the Gloversville Bar Association, and the New York State Bar Association.

Wood died at home on February 19, 1912.

New York State Assembly
Preceded by Clarence W. Smith	New York State Assembly; Fulton and Hamilton Counties; 1904-1905	Succeeded by William Ellison Mills
