= Daniel E. Finn Sr. =

American politician

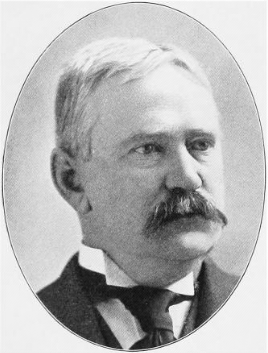
Daniel E. Finn

Daniel Edmund Finn Sr. (July 11, 1845 – March 23, 1910) was an American lawyer and politician from New York.

== Life ==
He was born on July 11, 1845, in Limerick, Ireland. The family emigrated to the United States when Daniel was still a child, and settled in New York City. He attended the public schools there. During the American Civil War he served with the New York Volunteers. After the war he entered politics as a Democrat. In January 1880, he was appointed as a Deputy Sheriff of New York County, New York.

Finn was a member of the New York State Assembly (New York Co., 1st D.) in 1885, 1886, 1887 and 1888. In the Legislature he fought successfully against the construction of piers in the shore area of Battery Park, and henceforth was nicknamed "Battery Dan". In May 1888, he was admitted to the bar at the General Term in Poughkeepsie.

He was again a member of the State Assembly in 1895, 1896, 1897, 1898 and 1899; and was Minority Leader in 1897. In November 1899, he was elected to the New York City Municipal Court (1st D.).

He was a justice of the Municipal Court from January 1900 to May 1, 1905, when he was appointed as a City Magistrate.

He died on March 23, 1910, at his home at 539 Broome Street in Manhattan; and was buried at the Calvary Cemetery in Queens.

== Legacy ==
His son Daniel E. Finn Jr. (1880–1949) was County Clerk of New York County, New York and Sheriff of New York County, New York.

== Sources ==
New York State Assembly
Preceded by Patrick H. Duffy	New York State Assembly; New York County, 1st District; 1885–1888	Succeeded by Patrick H. Duffy
Preceded by John H. G. Vehslage	New York State Assembly; New York County, 1st District; 1895–1899	Succeeded by Michael Halpin
Political offices
Preceded by John B. Stanchfield	Minority Leader in the New York State Assembly; 1897	Succeeded by Thomas F. Donnelly
