= William Harris (New York politician) =

American politician

William G. Harris (November 27, 1849 – November 29, 1924) was an American businessman and politician from New York.

== Life ==
Harris was born on November 27, 1849, in Hope, New York, the son of William Harris and Susan Wadsworth. His paternal grandfather immigrated to America from Scotland.

Harris served in the American Civil War as a drummer. He later moved to Northville, where he worked in the lumber business. He was also vice-president of the Fonda, Johnstown and Gloversville Railroad and president of the Northville bank. In 1885, he opened a hotel three miles north of Northville that proved popular with tourists.

Harris served as town supervisor of Hope for two years and town clerk for five. In 1899, he was elected to the New York State Assembly as a Republican, representing Fulton and Hamilton Counties. He served in the Assembly in 1900 and 1901.

In 1872, Harris married Alice J. Russell of Hope. Their children were Samuel, Leona, and Susan. He was an active member of the Freemasons.

Harris died at home on November 29, 1924. He was buried in Prospect Hill Cemetery in Northville.

New York State Assembly
Preceded by Daniel Hays	New York State Assembly; Fulton and Hamilton Counties; 1900-1901	Succeeded by Clarence W. Smith
