= James B. McEwan =

American politician

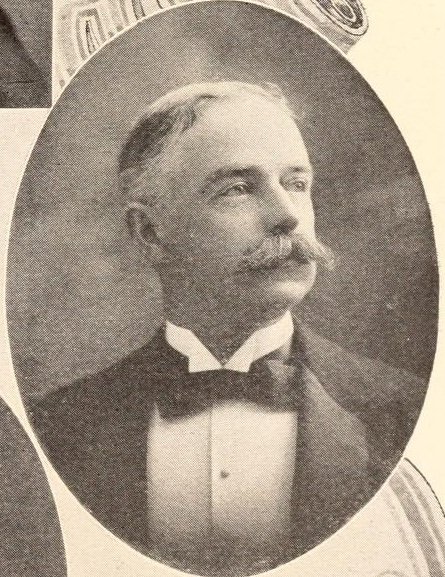
James B. McEwan (1900)

James Briggs McEwan (February 7, 1855 – December 27, 1915) was an American politician from New York.

== Life ==
He was born on February 7, 1855, in Albany, New York, the son of John McEwan and Agnes Gordon (Lauder) McEwan. He attended the public schools and Albany Free Academy. He graduated from Yale College in 1878. Then he engaged in the coal business with his brother. On April 21, 1898, he married Emma Smith McClure (died 1901). On December 6, 1902, he married Jennie (McClure) Manning, a widowed sister of his first wife.

McEwan was a member of the New York State Assembly (Albany Co., 2nd D.) in 1897, 1898, 1899 and 1900.

He was a member of the New York State Senate (29th D.) from 1901 to 1906, sitting in the 124th, 125th, 126th, 127th, 128th and 129th New York State Legislatures.

He was Postmaster of Albany from 1908 to 1909; and Mayor of Albany from 1910 to 1913.

He died on December 27, 1915, in Albany, New York, and was buried at the Albany Rural Cemetery in Menands.

== Sources ==
New York State Assembly
Preceded by James Keenholts	New York State Assembly; Albany County, 2nd District; 1897–1900	Succeeded by Abram S. Coon
New York State Senate
Preceded by Curtis N. Douglas	New York State Senate; 29th District; 1901–1906	Succeeded by Frank M. Boyce
Political offices
Preceded by Henry F. Snyder	Mayor of Albany, New York; 1910–1913	Succeeded by Joseph William Stevens
