= Spencer K. Warnick =

American politician (1874–1954)

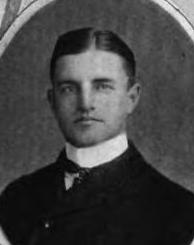
- Warnick in 1093

Member of the New York State Senate from the 27th district
- In office January 1, 1903 – December 31, 1906
- Preceded by: Hobart Krum
- Succeeded by: Jotham P. Allds

Personal details
- Born: Spencer Kellogg Warnick; September 14, 1874 Amsterdam, New York, U.S.
- Died: May 18, 1954 (aged 79) Amsterdam, New York, U.S.
- Party: Republican
- Spouse: Jane Maria Greene (m. 1898)
- Children: 2
- Education: Yale University
- Occupation: Politician

Spencer Kellogg Warnick (September 14, 1874 – May 18, 1954) was an American politician from New York.

== Life ==
Born September 14, 1874 in Amsterdam, Montgomery County, New York, Warnick was the son of Middleton Warnick (1845–1904) and Marion (Kellogg) Warnick (1849–1903). He graduated from Yale College in 1895. Then he studied law, was admitted to the bar in 1897, and commenced practice in Buffalo, but returned the next year to Amsterdam. On June 1, 1898, he married Jane Maria Greene, and they had two children.

Warnick was a member of the New York State Senate (27th D.) from 1903 to 1906, sitting in the 126th, 127th, 128th and 129th New York State Legislatures.

He died on May 18, 1954, in a hospital in Amsterdam, New York.

== Sources ==
- Official New York from Cleveland to Hughes by Charles Elliott Fitch (Hurd Publishing Co., New York and Buffalo, 1911, Vol. IV; pg. 365)
- The New York Red Book by Edgar L. Murlin (1903; pg. 100)
- "SPENCER K. WARNICK in The New York Times on May 19, 1954 (subscription required)
- Bio at RootsWeb

New York State Senate
Preceded by Hobart Krum	New York State Senate; 27th District; 1903–1906	Succeeded by Jotham P. Allds
