= Frank A. O'Donnel =

American politician

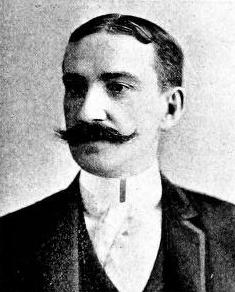
Frank A. O'Donnel (1893)

Frank A. O'Donnel (1852 New York City – July 5, 1906 Manhattan, New York City) was an American politician from New York.

== Life ==
He attended the public schools and City College of New York. Then he became an accountant.

O'Donnel was a member of the New York State Assembly (New York Co., 12th D.) in 1893; and of the New York State Senate (10th D.) in 1894 and 1895.

He was a personal friend of Tammany Boss Charles Francis Murphy, and was Treasurer of the Society of St. Tammany from 1902 to 1904. Mayor George B. McClellan, Jr. appointed O'Donnel in January 1904 as President of the New York City Board of Taxes and Assessment.

In May 1906, he traveled to Europe trying to improve his health. However, he got rather worse, and soon returned. He died on July 5, 1906, in his apartments at the St. George, at 223 East 17th Street, in Manhattan; and was buried at the Woodlawn Cemetery in the Bronx.

New York State Assembly
Preceded by Moses Dinkelspiel	New York State Assembly; New York County, 12th District; 1893	Succeeded by Edward B. La Fetra
New York State Senate
Preceded by Jacob A. Cantor	New York State Senate; 10th District; 1894–1895	Succeeded by John F. Ahearn
