= Karl Foster Warnick =

Karl Foster Warnick from the Brigham Young University, Provo, UT was named Fellow of the Institute of Electrical and Electronics Engineers (IEEE) in 2013 for contributions to theoretical and numerical analysis of phased-array antennas and microwave systems.
