= Almanzo W. Litchard =

American politician

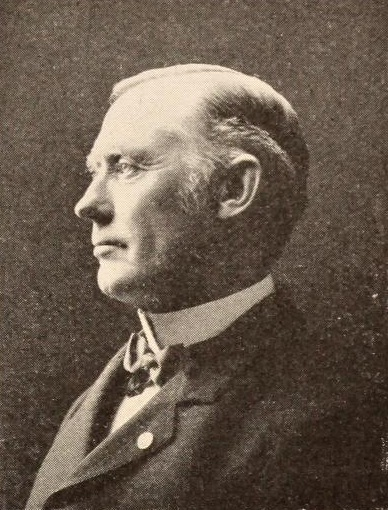
Almanzo W. Litchard (1900)

Almanzo W. Litchard (November 12, 1841 – 1906) was a soldier, farmer, and legislator in New York during the nineteenth century. He fought as a Union soldier during the Civil War and purchased a farm after serving his country. In later years he served as a member of the New York State Assembly.

== Early years ==
Almanzo Litchard and his twin brother Alexander were born on November 12, 1841, in Sparta, New York, to George and Nancy Litchard. The Litchard family moved to Almond, New York, where a younger brother named John was born three years later. An 1850 census of Almond, Allegany County, recorded the ages of the Litchard family: George (34), Nancy (37), Harriet (11), Alexander (8), Almanzo (8), and John (5). The census also stated that the Litchard real estate was worth $900. In 1855 Almanzo's mother died.

== Civil War ==
On August 24, 1861 Almanzo and his brother Alexander enlisted at Hornellsville, New York. They mustered into Company D, 86th New York Volunteer Infantry, led by Colonel Benajah Bailey, Lieutenant Colonel Barnard Chapin, and Major Seymour Rhinevault. On November 23, 1861, the Eighty-sixth Regiment left New York for Washington, D.C. Throughout the winter, the regiment defended the capitol as an attachment to the Second Brigade, Casey's Division, Army of the Potomac.

In 1862 the 86th New York Infantry was first attached to Wadsworth's Command, Military District of Washington, and then to Piatt's Brigade, Whipple's Division. In August the regiment moved out and joined Pope's Campaign in Northern Virginia. On August 30 Almanzo and Alexander fought at the Second Battle of Bull Run under the command of Colonel Bailey. Their regiment lost twenty-three men and thirty-eight went missing. In September the regiment returned to defend Washington as an attachment to First Brigade, Third Division, Third Army Corps, Army of the Potomac.

On November 13, 1862, Almanzo was discharged on account of illness at Washington, D.C. His brother Alexander was discharged for inflammatory rheumatism one month later.

On September 1, 1864, Almanzo and Alexander reenlisted into Company E, Ninth New York Heavy Artillery, Third Division, Sixth Corps. While serving in the armies of McClellan, Pope, Sheridan, and Ulysses S. Grant, Almanzo fought in the Shenandoah Valley Campaign, at the Siege of Petersburg, and in the Appomattox Campaign. On April 9, 1865, Almanzo and Alexander were present at Appomattox when Lee surrendered to Grant. Almanzo continued with his regiment until they reached Danville, where he became ill. On June 20, 1865, he was discharged to return home to New York.

== Almanzo's Diary ==
During the first year of the Civil War, Almanzo kept a faithful record of camp life in a pocket-sized journal. He discussed food, death, home life, sickness, weather, finances, officers, religion, camp recreation, military movements, and military discipline. While stationed in Georgetown just outside Washington, D.C., Almanzo attended congressional sessions and recorded the debates in the Senate and House of Representatives. He also visited Mount Vernon, the U.S. Treasury, and the Smithsonian Institution during his excursions into town. On one very special day, Almanzo shook hands with President Abraham Lincoln.

== Later years ==
In 1866 Almanzo and Alexander purchased land from the First Baptist Church of Rushford, New York. They cut down trees and shaped the land into a working farm. Although a freeze destroyed their first wheat crop, the two brothers succeeded in making cheese, raising cattle and sheep, and growing wheat, potatoes, and apples. In 1875, the Gazetter and Business Directory recorded that Almanzo and Alexander were also the proprietors of a flouring mill.

Following the war, Almanzo took a commercial course and graduated from Eastman's College in Poughkeepsie, New York. As a staunch Republican, he was a member of the New York State Assembly (Allegany Co,) in 1898, 1899 and 1900. He was a member of the committees on Internal Affairs, Excise, and Agriculture. Litchard also became president of three distinctive organizations: the Allegany County Farmers’ Club, the Allegany County Farmers’ Co-operative Fire Insurance Company, and the New York State Farmers’ Congress. He was sent to Albany to represent farmers’ interests.

In 1904, Almanzo was on the board of trustees for the Methodist Episcopal Church in Rushford, New York. He also became the superintendent of Sunday School. During his ministry at the Methodist Episcopal Church, Almanzo pushed for the purchase of a church bell. He died in 1906 before the church purchased the bell, but the church honored Almanzo by inscribing “Milton M. Woods, the sweet singer, and Almanzo W. Litchard, the Sunday School Superintendent” on the rim of their new bell.

== Legacy ==
In 1910 Helen Gilbert reminisced about the Litchard farm in her book Rushford and Rushford People:

The one hundred acres now owned by Mrs. Jennie Litchard Gilbert was given to our Baptist Church by the Holland Land Company. It was very heavily timbered with pine and was divided up into five and ten-acre lots and sold to the highest bidder. That gave those that had no timber a chance to secure some. I can remember when our Baptist Church stood in the woods on that farm. People said the land would not be worth a dollar an acre but the Litchard brothers thought better of it and bought it and cleared it and made a farm of it. I consider it one of the best farms in Allegany County. Today in 2012, Almanzo Litchard’s great-great-grandson, Edward Gilbert and his wife Jane, own the family farm which has received the Century Farm award.

== Bibliography ==
- “86th Infantry Regiment Civil War: Steuben Rangers.” New York State Military Museum and Veterans Research Center. 2008. http://dmna.ny.gov/historic/reghist/civil/infantry/86thInf/86thInfMain.htm (accessed September 18, 2012).
- Almond Historical Society. “Almond, Allegany County, NY: 1850 Census.” http://www.rootsweb.ancestry.com/~nyahs/almond1850p10.html (accessed September 17, 2012).
- Bernstein, Barbara. “Civil War Soldiers from Almond, NY.” Painted Hills Genealogy Society. February 18, 2005. http://www.paintedhills.org/ALLEGANY/almond~1.htm (accessed September 17, 2012).
- Buyer, Bob (January 3, 1994). "NY Family Taking Place in History with Designation of Century Farm". The Buffalo News. Buffalo, NY. Archived from the original on June 11, 2014 – via HighBeam Research.
- Child, Hamilton. “Gazetteer and Business Directory of Allegany County, N.Y. for 1875.” The USGenWeb Project. http://www.rootsweb.ancestry.com/~nyallega/childs-rushford.html (accessed September 17, 2012).
- The Civil War Archive. “Union Regimental Histories: New York.” http://www.civilwararchive.com/Unreghst/unnyart1.htm (accessed September 17, 2012).
- Civil War in the East. “86th New York Infantry Regiment ‘Steuben Rangers.’” https://web.archive.org/web/20110622230717/http://civilwarintheeast.com/USA/NY/NY086.php (accessed September 17, 2012).
- “Eighty-Sixth Infantry.” https://www.angelfire.com/ny4/djw/86thRoster.pdf (accessed September 18, 2012).
- Gernard, Jeremiah. Heinrich Gernhardt and His Descendants. Williamsport, PA: Press of the Gazette and Bulletin, 1904.
- Gilbert, Helen, ed. Rushford and Rushford People. Chautauqua, NY: Chautauqua Print Shop, 1910.
- Litchard, Alamanzo. “Civil War Diary, 1861-1862.” Gilbert Collection, Rushford, New York.
- McDonough, John, ed. Laws of the State of New York, Passed at the One Hundred and Twenty-Third Session of the Legislature. Vol. 2. Albany, NY: J. B. Lyon Company Printers, 1900.
- Minard, John. Allegany County and Its People. Alfred, NY: W. A. Fergusson & Co., 1896.
- Murlin, Edgar. The New York Red Book. Albany, NY: James B. Lyon Publisher, 1898.
- Roe, Alfred. The Ninth New York Heavy Artillery. Worcester, MA: F. S. Blanchard & Co., 1899.

New York State Assembly
Preceded by Fred A. Robbins	New York State Assembly; Allegany County; 1898–1900	Succeeded by Jesse S. Phillips
