= Edwin C. Stewart =

American politician

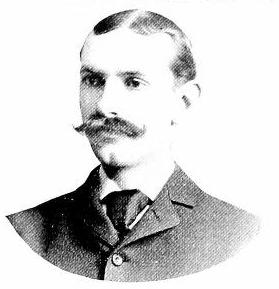
Edwin C. Stewart (1894)

Edwin C. Stewart (March 8, 1864 in Newfield, Tompkins County, New York – June 15, 1921) was an American politician from New York.

== Life ==
He was the son of David B. Stewart (1832–1915), the first Mayor of Ithaca. He attended the public schools in Ithaca, and then became a partner in his father's wholesale grocery business.

Stewart was a member of the New York State Assembly (Tompkins Co.) in 1894 and 1895.

He was a member of the New York State Senate (40th D.) from 1896 to 1898, and from 1901 to 1904; sitting in the 119th, 120th, 121st, 124th, 125th, 126th and 127th New York State Legislatures.

He was Mayor of Ithaca from 1920 until his death on June 15, 1921. His widow died about half a year later, and the estate became a party in a case argued before the U.S. Supreme Court concerning the payment of estate taxes.

Stewart Park in Ithaca was named in his honor.

== See also ==
- List of mayors of Ithaca, New York

== Sources ==
- The New York Red Book compiled by Edgar L. Murlin (published by James B. Lyon, Albany NY, 1897; pg. 170, 404 and 511f)
- Sketches of the members of the Legislature in The Evening Journal Almanac (1895; pg. 63)
- Obituary Notes; DAVID B. STEWART died... in NYT on October 29, 1915
- Stewart family bios transcribed from Landmarks of Tompkins County by John H. Selkreg (1894)

New York State Assembly
Preceded by Albert H. Pierson	New York State Assembly; Tompkins County; 1894–1895	Succeeded by Frederick E. Bates
New York State Senate
Preceded by new district	New York State Senate; 40th District; 1896–1898	Succeeded by Charles T. Willis
Preceded by Charles T. Willis	New York State Senate; 40th District; 1901–1904	Succeeded by Owen Cassidy
