= Otto Wicke =

American politician

Otto Wicke (December 23, 1864 – March 28, 1922) was a Danish-American pharmacist and politician.

== Life ==
Wicke was born on December 23, 1864, in Copenhagen, Denmark. His parents were German.

Wicke graduated from the University of Copenhagen School of Pharmacy. He immigrated to America in 1885 and settled in Brooklyn. He then opened a drug store in Bushwick. He later organized a chain of 26 drug stores and was president of the Otto Wicke Company. He also owned the patents for several medicines. He then sold all his stores and retired to Howard Beach.

In 1897, Wicke was elected to the New York State Assembly as a Democrat, representing the Kings County 20th District. He served in the Assembly in 1898. He was a close friend of Theodore Roosevelt, and he joined the Bull Moose Party upon its formation in 1912, organized the Party's headquarters in several parts of Brooklyn, and was a delegate to the 1912 Progressive National Convention. In the 1914 United States House of Representatives election, he was the Progressive candidate for New York's 3rd congressional district. He lost to Joseph V. Flynn.

Wicke's wife was Louise Moje. Their children were Otto Hugo and Mrs. Antonia Emma Whiting. He was a member of the Freemasons.

Wicke died of arterio-sclerosis at home on March 28, 1922.

New York State Assembly
Preceded by Frederick G. Hughes	New York State Assembly; Kings County, 20th District; 1898	Succeeded by Joseph Wingenfeld
