= Philip Keck =

American politician

Philip Keck (October 26, 1848 – March 9, 1911) was an American lawyer, judge, and politician.

Keck was born in Johnstown, New York. In 1860, Keck moved to Montgomery, Illinois to live with an uncle for two years and helped with farming; he then worked in a store in Bristol Station, Illinois as a clerk for one year. He returned to Johnstown. Keck then went to Clinton Liberal Institute, Hamilton College, and Albany Law School. Keck was admitted to the New York bar in 1876 and practiced law in Johnstown, New York. In 1884, Keck was elected county judge for Fulton County, New York. Keck served in the New York Assembly in 1893, 1894, and 1895. He was a Republican.

== Notes ==
New York State Assembly
Preceded by Horace S. Judson	New York State Assembly; Fulton and Hamilton Counties; 1893-1895	Succeeded by Byron D. Brown
