= 125th New York State Legislature =

New York state legislative session

←	124th	126th	→
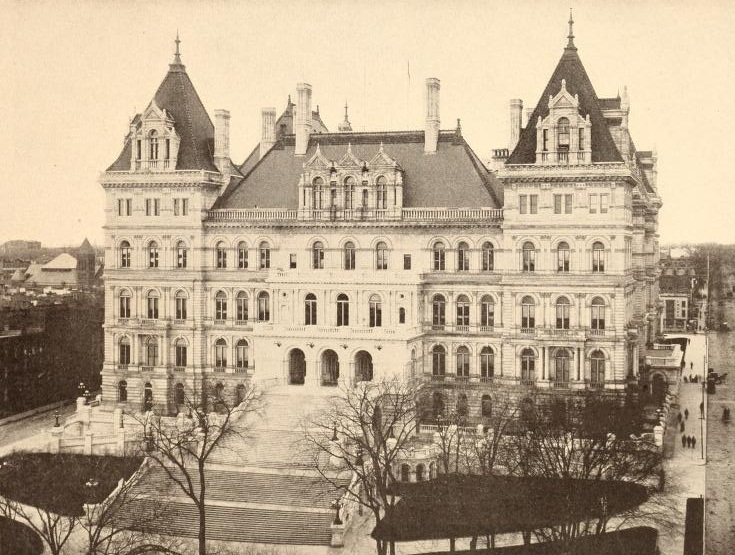
- New York State Capitol (1900)

Overview
- Legislative body: New York State Legislature
- Jurisdiction: New York, United States
- Term: January 1 – December 31, 1902

Senate
- Members: 50
- President: Lt. Gov. Timothy L. Woodruff (R)
- Temporary President: Timothy E. Ellsworth (R)
- Party control: Republican (35–15)

Assembly
- Members: 150
- Speaker: S. Frederick Nixon (R)
- Party control: Republican (106-42–2)

Sessions
- 1st: January 1 – March 27, 1902

The 125th New York State Legislature, consisting of the New York State Senate and the New York State Assembly, met from January 1 to March 27, 1902, during the second year of Benjamin B. Odell Jr.'s governorship, in Albany.

== Background ==
Under the provisions of the New York Constitution of 1894, 50 Senators and 150 assemblymen were elected in single-seat districts; senators for a two-year term, assemblymen for a one-year term. The senatorial districts were made up of entire counties, except New York County (twelve districts), Kings County (seven districts), Erie County (three districts) and Monroe County (two districts). The Assembly districts were made up of contiguous area, all within the same county.

At this time there were two major political parties: the Republican Party and the Democratic Party.

== Elections ==
The New York state election, 1901, was held on November 5. No statewide elective offices were up for election.

== Sessions ==
The Legislature met for the regular session at the State Capitol in Albany on January 1, 1902; and adjourned on March 27.

S. Frederick Nixon (R) was re-elected Speaker.

== State Senate ==
=== Districts ===
- 1st District: Richmond and Suffolk counties
- 2nd District: Queens and Nassau counties
- 3rd District: 1st, 2nd, 3rd, 4th, 5th and 6th Ward of Brooklyn, as constituted in 1894
- 4th District: 7th, 13th, 19th and 21st Ward of Brooklyn, as constituted in 1894
- 5th District: 8th, 10th, 12th and 30th Ward of Brooklyn, and the annexed former Town of Gravesend, as constituted in 1894
- 6th District: 9th, 11th, 20th and 22nd Ward of Brooklyn, as constituted in 1894
- 7th District: 14th, 15th, 16th and 17th Ward of Brooklyn, as constituted in 1894
- 8th District: 23rd, 24th, 25th and 29th Ward of Brooklyn; and the annexed former Town of Flatlands, as constituted in 1894
- 9th District: 18th, 26th, 27th and 28th Ward of Brooklyn, as constituted in 1894
- 10th, 11th, 12th, 13th, 14th, 15th, 16th, 17th, 18th, 19th, 20th and 21st District: Parts of the City of New York, defined geographically by their bordering streets, regardless of Wards or Assembly districts
- 22nd District: Westchester County
- 23rd District: Orange and Rockland counties
- 24th District: Columbia, Dutchess and Putnam and counties
- 25th District: Greene and Ulster counties
- 26th District: Chenango, Delaware and Sullivan counties
- 27th District: Fulton, Hamilton, Montgomery and Schoharie counties
- 28th District: Saratoga, Schenectady and Washington counties
- 29th District: Albany County
- 30th District: Rensselaer County
- 31st District: Clinton, Essex and Warren counties
- 32nd District: Franklin and St. Lawrence counties
- 33rd District: Otsego and Herkimer counties
- 34th District: Oneida County
- 35th District: Jefferson and Lewis counties
- 36th District: Onondaga County
- 37th District: Oswego and Madison counties
- 38th District: Broome, Cortland and Tioga counties
- 39th District: Cayuga and Seneca counties
- 40th District: Chemung, Schuyler and Tompkins counties
- 41st District: Steuben and Yates counties
- 42nd District: Ontario and Wayne counties
- 43rd District: 4th, 6th, 7th, 8th, 12th, 13th, 14th, 16th, 17th and 18th Ward of Rochester; and the towns of Brighton, Henrietta, Irondequoit, Menden, Penfield, Perinton, Pittsford, Rush and Webster, in Monroe County
- 44th District: 1st, 2nd, 3rd, 5th, 9th, 10th, 11th, 15th, 19th and 20th Ward of Rochester; and the towns of Chili, Clarkson, Gates, Greece, Hamlin, Ogden, Parma, Riga, Sweden and Wheatland, in Monroe County
- 45th District: Genesee, Niagara and Orleans counties
- 46th District: Allegany, Livingston and Wyoming counties
- 47th District: 1st, 2nd, 3rd, 6th, 15th, 19th, 20th, 21st, 22nd, 23rd and 24th Ward of Buffalo
- 48th District: 4th, 5th, 7th, 8th, 9th, 10th, 11th, 12th, 13th, 14th and 16th Ward of Buffalo
- 49th District: 17th, 18th and 25th Ward of the City of Buffalo; and all area in Erie County outside Buffalo
- 50th District: Cattaraugus and Chautauqua counties

Note: In 1897, New York County (the boroughs of Manhattan and Bronx), Kings County (the borough of Brooklyn), Richmond County (the borough of Staten Island) and the Western part of Queens County (the borough of Queens) were consolidated into the present-day City of New York. The Eastern part of Queens County (the non-consolidated part) was separated in 1899 as Nassau County. Parts of the 1st and 2nd Assembly districts of Westchester County were annexed by New York City in 1895, and became part of the Borough of the Bronx in 1898.

=== Members ===
The asterisk (*) denotes members of the previous Legislature who continued in office as members of this Legislature. Merton E. Lewis changed from the Assembly to the Senate.

Note: For brevity, the chairmanships omit the words "...the Committee on (the)..."

District	Senator	Party	Notes
1st	William M. McKinney*	Republican	
2nd	William W. Cocks*	Republican	
3rd	Thomas H. Cullen*	Democrat	
4th	Arthur J. Audett*	Republican	Chairman of Public Health
5th	James H. McCabe*	Democrat	
6th	Rudolph C. Fuller*	Republican	Chairman of Revision
7th	Patrick H. McCarren*	Democrat	
8th	Henry Marshall*	Republican	Chairman of Printed and Engrossed Bills
9th	Joseph Wagner*	Democrat	
10th	John F. Ahearn*	Democrat	
11th	Timothy D. Sullivan*	Democrat	on November 4, 1902, elected to the 58th U.S. Congress
12th	Samuel J. Foley*	Democrat	
13th	Bernard F. Martin*	Democrat	
14th	Thomas F. Grady*	Democrat	Minority Leader
15th	Nathaniel A. Elsberg*	Republican	Chairman of Commerce and Navigation
16th	Patrick F. Trainor*	Democrat	died on December 25, 1902
17th	George W. Plunkitt*	Democrat	
18th	Victor J. Dowling*	Democrat	
19th	Samuel S. Slater*	Republican	Chairman of Trades and Manufactures
20th	Thomas F. Donnelly*	Democrat	
21st	Joseph P. Hennessy*	Democrat	
22nd	Isaac N. Mills*	Republican	
23rd	Louis F. Goodsell*	Republican	Chairman of Miscellaneous Corporations
24th	Henry S. Ambler*	Republican	Chairman of Agriculture
25th	William S. C. Wiley*	Republican	
26th	William L. Thornton*	Republican	Chairman of Privileges and Elections
27th	Hobart Krum*	Republican	Chairman of Taxation and Retrenchment
28th	Edgar T. Brackett*	Republican	Chairman of Judiciary
29th	James B. McEwan*	Republican	Chairman of Affairs of Villages
30th	William D. Barnes	Republican	elected to fill vacancy, in place of Michael Russell; Chairman of Indian Affairs
31st	Spencer G. Prime*	Republican	
32nd	George R. Malby*	Republican	Chairman of Insurance
33rd	James D. Feeter*	Republican	Chairman of Internal Affairs of Towns and Counties
34th	Garry A. Willard*	Republican	
35th	Elon R. Brown*	Republican	Chairman of Forest, Fish and Game Laws
36th	Horace White*	Republican	Chairman of Codes
37th	Nevada N. Stranahan*	Republican	Chairman of Affairs of Cities; seat vacated on April 3, upon taking office as Collector of the Port of New York
38th	George E. Green*	Republican	
39th	Benjamin M. Wilcox*	Republican	Chairman of Penal Institutions
40th	Edwin C. Stewart*	Republican	
41st	Franklin D. Sherwood*	Republican	Chairman of Public Printing
42nd	John Raines*	Republican	Chairman of Railroads
43rd	Merton E. Lewis*	Republican	elected to fill vacancy, in place of Cornelius R. Parsons; Chairman of Public Education
44th	William W. Armstrong*	Republican	Chairman of Roads and Bridges
45th	Timothy E. Ellsworth*	Republican	President pro tempore; Chairman of Rules
46th	Lester H. Humphrey*	Republican	Chairman of Banks; died on March 17, 1902
47th	Henry W. Hill*	Republican	Chairman of Military Affairs
48th	Samuel J. Ramsperger*	Democrat	
49th	George Allen Davis*	Republican	Chairman of Canals
50th	Frank W. Higgins*	Republican	Chairman of Finance; on November 4, 1902, elected Lieutenant Governor

=== Employees ===
- Clerk: James S. Whipple
- Sergeant-at-Arms: Charles R. Hotaling
- Assistant Sergeant-at-Arms: William W. Adams
- Doorkeeper: John E. Gorss
- First Assistant Doorkeeper: R. C. Duell
- Stenographer: A. B. Sackett
- Assistant Clerk: Lafayette B. Gleason
- Journal Clerk: Ernest A. Fay
- Index Clerk: A. Miner Wellman
- Clerk of the Finance Committee: Girvease A. Matteson

== State Assembly ==
=== Assemblymen ===
Note: For brevity, the chairmanships omit the words "...the Committee on (the)..."

District		Assemblymen	Party	Notes
Albany	1st	William L. Coughtry*	Republican	Chairman of Insurance
Albany	2nd	Abram S. Coon*	Republican	
Albany	3rd	Robert J. Higgins	Ind. Dem.	
Albany	4th	Thomas G. Ross*	Republican	
Allegany		Jesse S. Phillips*	Republican	
Broome	1st	James T. Rogers*	Republican	Chairman of Judiciary
Broome	2nd	Fred E. Allen	Republican	
Cattaraugus	1st	Myron E. Fisher*	Republican	Chairman of Public Health
Cattaraugus	2nd	Albert T. Fancher*	Republican	Chairman of Indian Affairs
Cayuga	1st	Ernest G. Treat*	Republican	
Cayuga	2nd	Charles J. Hewitt	Republican	
Chautauqua	1st	J. Samuel Fowler*	Republican	Chairman of Affairs of Villages
Chautauqua	2nd	S. Frederick Nixon*	Republican	re-elected Speaker; Chairman of Rules
Chemung		Charles H. Knipp*	Republican	Chairman of Excise
Chenango		Jotham P. Allds*	Republican	Majority Leader; Chairman of Ways and Means
Clinton		John F. O'Brien*	Republican	on November 4, 1902, elected Secretary of State
Columbia		Elbert Payne	Republican	
Cortland		Henry A. Dickinson*	Republican	
Delaware		James R. Cowan	Republican	
Dutchess	1st	John T. Smith*	Republican	Chairman of Banks
Dutchess	2nd	Francis G. Landon*	Republican	
Erie	1st	John H. Bradley*	Democrat	
Erie	2nd	Edward R. O'Malley*	Republican	
Erie	3rd	Anthony F. Burke	Democrat	
Erie	4th	William Schneider*	Republican	
Erie	5th	Charles F. Brooks*	Republican	
Erie	6th	George Ruehl*	Republican	
Erie	7th	John K. Patton*	Republican	Chairman of Charitable and Religious Societies
Erie	8th	Elijah Cook*	Republican	Chairman of Privileges and Elections
Essex		James M. Graeff*	Republican	Chairman of Agriculture
Franklin		Halbert D. Stevens*	Republican	
Fulton and Hamilton		Clarence W. Smith	Republican	
Genesee		S. Percy Hooker	Republican	
Greene		William W. Rider*	Democrat	
Herkimer		Samuel M. Allston*	Republican	
Jefferson	1st	Lewis W. Day	Democrat	
Jefferson	2nd	James A. Outterson	Republican	
Kings	1st	John Hill Morgan*	Republican	Chairman of Taxation and Retrenchment
Kings	2nd	John McKeown*	Democrat	
Kings	3rd	James J. McInerney*	Democrat	
Kings	4th	Charles H. Cotton*	Republican	Chairman of Military Affairs
Kings	5th	George Langhorst	Republican	
Kings	6th	Simon Ash	Republican	
Kings	7th	Peter J. Lally	Democrat	
Kings	8th	John C. L. Daly*	Democrat	
Kings	9th	William P. Fitzpatrick*	Democrat	
Kings	10th	John Rainey*	Republican	
Kings	11th	Waldo R. Blackwell*	Republican	
Kings	12th	Howard L. Woody	Republican	
Kings	13th	James M. Manee	Republican	
Kings	14th	John B. Ferre	Democrat	
Kings	15th	Harry H. Dale	Democrat	
Kings	16th	Gustavus C. Weber*	Republican	
Kings	17th	Harris Wilson*	Republican	Chairman of Claims
Kings	18th	Jacob D. Remsen*	Republican	
Kings	19th	John Wolf	Democrat	
Kings	20th	William H. Pendry	Republican	
Kings	21st	Joseph H. Adams*	Republican	Chairman of Federal Relations
Lewis		Lewis H. Stiles	Republican	
Livingston		Otto Kelsey*	Republican	Chairman of Affairs of Cities
Madison		Avery M. Hoadley	Republican	
Monroe	1st	Martin Davis	Republican	
Monroe	2nd	George H. Smith	Republican	
Monroe	3rd	Richard Gardiner*	Republican	Chairman of Revision
Monroe	4th	Isaac W. Salyerds*	Republican	
Montgomery		John W. Candee	Republican	
New York	1st	Thomas F. Baldwin	Democrat	
New York	2nd	Joseph P. Bourke	Democrat	
New York	3rd	Anthony J. Barrett	Democrat	
New York	4th	William H. Burns*	Democrat	
New York	5th	Edward R. Finch	Republican	
New York	6th	Harry E. Oxford	Democrat	
New York	7th	James E. Duross*	Democrat	
New York	8th	Charles S. Adler*	Republican	Chairman of Trades and Manufactures
New York	9th	James A. Allen	Republican	
New York	10th	John F. McCullough	Democrat	
New York	11th	Clarence McAdam	Democrat	
New York	12th	Leon Sanders*	Democrat	
New York	13th	Richard S. Reilley*	Democrat	
New York	14th	Henry W. Doll	Democrat	
New York	15th	James E. Smith*	Democrat	
New York	16th	Samuel Prince*	Democrat	
New York	17th	James J. Fitzgerald*	Democrat	
New York	18th	George P. Richter*	Democrat	
New York	19th	Julius H. Seymour*	Republican	
New York	20th	John H. Fitzpatrick	Democrat	
New York	21st	William S. Bennet*	Republican	
New York	22nd	William F. Meeks	Democrat	
New York	23rd	Josiah T. Newcomb	Republican	
New York	24th	Leo P. Ulmann*	Democrat	
New York	25th	John A. Weekes Jr.*	Republican	Chairman of Codes
New York	26th	Myron Sulzberger	Democrat	
New York	27th	Gherardi Davis*	Republican	Chairman of Public Lands and Forestry
New York	28th	John T. Dooling*	Democrat	
New York	29th	Bainbridge Colby	Republican	
New York	30th	Gotthardt A. Litthauer	Democrat	
New York	31st	Arthur L. Sherer*	Republican	
New York	32nd	Matthew F. Neville	Democrat	
New York	33rd	John J. Egan*	Democrat	
New York	34th	John J. Scanlon*	Democrat	
New York	35th	Franklin Grady	Ind. Dem.	
Niagara	1st	John T. Darrison*	Republican	Chairman of Public Printing
Niagara	2nd	John H. Leggett*	Republican	
Oneida	1st	Michael J. McQuade*	Republican	
Oneida	2nd	Fred J. Brill*	Republican	
Oneida	3rd	Edward M. Marson*	Republican	Chairman of Fisheries and Game
Onondaga	1st	James F. Williams	Republican	
Onondaga	2nd	Frederick D. Traub*	Republican	
Onondaga	3rd	Martin L. Cadin*	Republican	
Onondaga	4th	Fred W. Hammond*	Republican	
Ontario		Jean L. Burnett*	Republican	Chairman of General Laws
Orange	1st	John Orr*	Republican	
Orange	2nd	Louis Bedell*	Republican	Chairman of Railroads
Orleans		William W. Phipps*	Republican	
Oswego	1st	Thomas D. Lewis*	Republican	Chairman of Canals
Oswego	2nd	Thomas M. Costello*	Republican	Chairman of Labor and Industries
Otsego		John B. Conkling	Republican	
Putnam		John R. Yale	Republican	
Queens	1st	Luke A. Keenan*	Democrat	
Queens	2nd	Francis X. Duer	Democrat	
Queens and Nassau		George W. Doughty*	Republican	Chairman of Internal Affairs
Rensselaer	1st	John M. Chambers	Republican	
Rensselaer	2nd	John F. Ahearn*	Republican	Chairman of Public Institutions
Rensselaer	3rd	Charles W. Reynolds*	Republican	
Richmond		Ferdinand C. Townsend	Republican	
Rockland		George Dickey*	Democrat	
St. Lawrence	1st	Charles S. Plank*	Republican	Chairman of State Prisons
St. Lawrence	2nd	Edwin A. Merritt Jr.	Republican	
Saratoga		William K. Mansfield*	Republican	
Schenectady		Andrew J. McMillan*	Republican	Chairman of Printed and Engrossed Bills
Schoharie		George M. Palmer	Democrat	Minority Leader
Schuyler		Olin T. Nye*	Republican	
Seneca		Daniel W. Moran	Republican	
Steuben	1st	Frank C. Platt*	Republican	Chairman of Soldiers' Home
Steuben	2nd	Gordon M. Patchin	Republican	
Suffolk	1st	Willis A. Reeve	Republican	
Suffolk	2nd	George A. Robinson*	Republican	
Sullivan		Edwin R. Dusinbery*	Republican	Chairman of Unfinished Business
Tioga		Edwin S. Hanford*	Republican	
Tompkins		George E. Monroe	Republican	
Ulster	1st	Robert A. Snyder*	Republican	Chairman of Commerce and Navigation
Ulster	2nd	Sands Haviland	Republican	
Warren		James L. Fuller	Republican	
Washington		William H. Hughes	Republican	
Wayne		Frederick W. Griffith*	Republican	Chairman of Public Education
Westchester	1st	John J. Sloane	Democrat	
Westchester	2nd	J. Mayhew Wainwright	Republican	
Westchester	3rd	James K. Apgar*	Republican	Chairman of Electricity, Gas and Water Supply
Wyoming		Henry J. McNair	Republican	
Yates		Ernest R. Bordwell	Democrat	

=== Employees ===
- Clerk: Archie E. Baxter
- Sergeant-at-Arms: Frank J. Johnston
- Doorkeeper: Jacob Kemple
- First Assistant Doorkeeper: Andrew Kehn
- Second Assistant Doorkeeper: Charles C. Gray
- Stenographer: Henry C. Lammert
- Assistant Clerk: Ray B. Smith
- Chief of the Engrossing Department: Charles H. Betts

== Sources ==
- The New York Red Book by Edgar L. Murlin (J. B. Lyon Co., Albany NY; 1902; see pg. 55–96 for senators' bios; between pg. 80 and 81 for senators' portraits; pg. 97–182 for assemblymen's bios; between pg. 112 and 113 for assemblymen's portraits; pg. 546 for senators; pg. 570ff for senate and assemblymen's committees; and pg. 575–578 for assemblymen)
- Official New York from Cleveland to Hughes by Charles Elliott Fitch (Hurd Publishing Co., New York and Buffalo, 1911, Vol. IV; see pg. 345f for assemblymen; and 364 for senators)
- Laws of the State of New York (125th Session) (1902)
- REPUBLICAN INCREASE IN THE ASSEMBLY; ...Republicans Elect ... Senators in the Thirtieth and Forty-third Districts to Fill Vacancies in NYT on November 6, 1901
- ASSEMBLYMEN ELECTED in NYT on November 6, 1901
- LEGISLATIVE CAUCUSES ARE HELD AT ALBANY in NYT on January 1, 1902
- OPENING DAY OF THE STATE LEGISLATURE in NYT on January 2, 1902
