= 124th New York State Legislature =

New York state legislative session

←	123rd	125th	→
- New York State Capitol (2009)

Overview
- Legislative body: New York State Legislature
- Jurisdiction: New York, United States
- Term: January 1 – December 31, 1901

Senate
- Members: 50
- President: Lt. Gov. Timothy L. Woodruff (R)
- Temporary President: Timothy E. Ellsworth (R)
- Party control: Republican (35-15)

Assembly
- Members: 150
- Speaker: S. Frederick Nixon (R)
- Party control: Republican (105-45)

Sessions
- 1st: January 2 – April 23, 1901

The 124th New York State Legislature, consisting of the New York State Senate and the New York State Assembly, met from January 2 to April 23, 1901, during the first year of Benjamin B. Odell Jr.'s governorship, in Albany.

== Background ==
Under the body of the New York Constitution of 1894, 50 Senators and 150 assemblymen were elected in single-seat districts; senators for a two-year term, assemblymen for a one-year term. The senatorial districts were made up of entire counties, except New York County (twelve districts), Kings County (seven districts), Erie County (three districts) and Monroe County (two districts). The Assembly districts were made up of contiguous area, all within the same county.

At this time there were two major political parties: the Republican Party and the Democratic Party. The Prohibition Party, the Socialist Labor Party and the Social Democratic Party also nominated tickets.

== Elections ==
The 1900 New York state election, was held on November 6. Gov. Theodore Roosevelt was elected U.S. vice president. Benjamin B. Odell Jr. was elected Governor; and Lt. Gov. Timothy L. Woodruff was re-elected; both Republicans. The other five statewide elective offices up for election were also carried by the Republicans. The approximate party strength at this election, as expressed by the vote for Governor, was: Republicans 805,000; Democrats 694,000; Prohibition 23,000; Socialist Labor 14,000; and Social Democrats 13,000.

== Sessions ==
The Legislature met for the regular session at the State Capitol in Albany on January 2, 1901, and adjourned on April 23.

S. Frederick Nixon (R) was re-elected Speaker, with 104 votes against 42 for Daniel D. Frisbie (D).

Timothy E. Ellsworth (R) was re-elected President pro tempore of the State Senate.

== State Senate ==
=== Districts ===
- 1st District: Richmond and Suffolk counties
- 2nd District: Queens and Nassau counties
- 3rd District: 1st, 2nd, 3rd, 4th, 5th and 6th Ward of Brooklyn, as constituted in 1894
- 4th District: 7th, 13th, 19th and 21st Ward of Brooklyn, as constituted in 1894
- 5th District: 8th, 10th, 12th and 30th Ward of Brooklyn, and the annexed former Town of Gravesend, as constituted in 1894
- 6th District: 9th, 11th, 20th and 22nd Ward of Brooklyn, as constituted in 1894
- 7th District: 14th, 15th, 16th and 17th Ward of Brooklyn, as constituted in 1894
- 8th District: 23rd, 24th, 25th and 29th Ward of Brooklyn; and the annexed former Town of Flatlands, as constituted in 1894
- 9th District: 18th, 26th, 27th and 28th Ward of Brooklyn, as constituted in 1894
- 10th, 11th, 12th, 13th, 14th, 15th, 16th, 17th, 18th, 19th, 20th and 21st District: Parts of the City of New York, defined geographically by their bordering streets, regardless of Wards or Assembly districts
- 22nd District: Westchester County
- 23rd District: Orange and Rockland counties
- 24th District: Columbia, Dutchess and Putnam and counties
- 25th District: Greene and Ulster counties
- 26th District: Chenango, Delaware and Sullivan counties
- 27th District: Fulton, Hamilton, Montgomery and Schoharie counties
- 28th District: Saratoga, Schenectady and Washington counties
- 29th District: Albany County
- 30th District: Rensselaer County
- 31st District: Clinton, Essex and Warren counties
- 32nd District: Franklin and St. Lawrence counties
- 33rd District: Otsego and Herkimer counties
- 34th District: Oneida County
- 35th District: Jefferson and Lewis counties
- 36th District: Onondaga County
- 37th District: Oswego and Madison counties
- 38th District: Broome, Cortland and Tioga counties
- 39th District: Cayuga and Seneca counties
- 40th District: Chemung, Schuyler and Tompkins counties
- 41st District: Steuben and Yates counties
- 42nd District: Ontario and Wayne counties
- 43rd District: 4th, 6th, 7th, 8th, 12th, 13th, 14th, 16th, 17th and 18th Ward of Rochester; and the towns of Brighton, Henrietta, Irondequoit, Menden, Penfield, Perinton, Pittsford, Rush and Webster, in Monroe County
- 44th District: 1st, 2nd, 3rd, 5th, 9th, 10th, 11th, 15th, 19th and 20th Ward of Rochester; and the towns of Chili, Clarkson, Gates, Greece, Hamlin, Ogden, Parma, Riga, Sweden and Wheatland, in Monroe County
- 45th District: Genesee, Niagara and Orleans counties
- 46th District: Allegany, Livingston and Wyoming counties
- 47th District: 1st, 2nd, 3rd, 6th, 15th, 19th, 20th, 21st, 22nd, 23rd and 24th Ward of Buffalo
- 48th District: 4th, 5th, 7th, 8th, 9th, 10th, 11th, 12th, 13th, 14th and 16th Ward of Buffalo
- 49th District: 17th, 18th and 25th Ward of the City of Buffalo; and all area in Erie County outside Buffalo
- 50th District: Cattaraugus and Chautauqua counties

Note: In 1897, New York County (the boroughs of Manhattan and Bronx), Kings County (the borough of Brooklyn), Richmond County (the borough of Staten Island) and the Western part of Queens County (the borough of Queens) were consolidated into the present-day City of New York. The Eastern part of Queens County (the non-consolidated part) was separated in 1899 as Nassau County. Parts of the 1st and 2nd Assembly districts of Westchester County were annexed by New York City in 1895, and became part of the Borough of the Bronx in 1898.

=== Senators ===
The asterisk (*) denotes members of the previous Legislature who continued in office as members of this Legislature. Patrick F. Trainor, Samuel S. Slater, James B. Ewan, Michael Russell and Henry W. Hill changed from the Assembly to the Senate.

District	Senator	Party	Notes
1st	William M. McKinney	Republican	
2nd	William W. Cocks	Republican	
3rd	Thomas H. Cullen*	Democrat	
4th	Arthur J. Audett	Republican	
5th	James H. McCabe	Democrat	
6th	Rudolph C. Fuller	Republican	
7th	Patrick H. McCarren*	Democrat	
8th	Henry Marshall*	Republican	
9th	Joseph Wagner*	Democrat	
10th	John F. Ahearn*	Democrat	
11th	Timothy D. Sullivan*	Democrat	
12th	Samuel J. Foley*	Democrat	
13th	Bernard F. Martin*	Democrat	
14th	Thomas F. Grady*	Democrat	Minority Leader
15th	Nathaniel A. Elsberg*	Republican	
16th	Patrick F. Trainor*	Democrat	
17th	George W. Plunkitt*	Democrat	
18th	Victor J. Dowling	Democrat	
19th	Samuel S. Slater*	Republican	
20th	Thomas F. Donnelly*	Democrat	
21st	Joseph P. Hennessy	Democrat	
22nd	Isaac N. Mills	Republican	
23rd	Louis F. Goodsell*	Republican	
24th	Henry S. Ambler*	Republican	
25th	William S. C. Wiley	Republican	
26th	William L. Thornton*	Republican	
27th	Hobart Krum*	Republican	
28th	Edgar T. Brackett*	Republican	
29th	James B. McEwan*	Republican	
30th	Michael Russell*	Republican	died on May 6, 1901
31st	Spencer G. Prime	Republican	
32nd	George R. Malby*	Republican	
33rd	James D. Feeter*	Republican	
34th	Garry A. Willard	Republican	
35th	Elon R. Brown*	Republican	
36th	Horace White*	Republican	
37th	Nevada N. Stranahan*	Republican	
38th	George E. Green	Republican	
39th	Benjamin M. Wilcox*	Republican	
40th	Edwin C. Stewart	Republican	
41st	Franklin D. Sherwood*	Republican	
42nd	John Raines*	Republican	
43rd	Cornelius R. Parsons*	Republican	died on January 30, 1901
44th	William W. Armstrong*	Republican	
45th	Timothy E. Ellsworth*	Republican	re-elected President pro tempore
46th	Lester H. Humphrey*	Republican	
47th	Henry W. Hill*	Republican	
48th	Samuel J. Ramsperger*	Democrat	
49th	George Allen Davis*	Republican	
50th	Frank W. Higgins*	Republican	

=== Employees ===
- Clerk: James S. Whipple

== State Assembly ==
=== Assemblymen ===
District		Assemblymen	Party	Notes
Albany	1st	William L. Coughtry*	Republican	
Albany	2nd	Abram S. Coon	Republican	
Albany	3rd	George T. Kelly*	Democrat	
Albany	4th	Thomas G. Ross	Republican	
Allegany		Jesse S. Phillips	Republican	
Broome	1st	James T. Rogers*	Republican	
Broome	2nd	John H. Swift*	Republican	
Cattaraugus	1st	Myron E. Fisher	Republican	
Cattaraugus	2nd	Albert T. Fancher*	Republican	
Cayuga	1st	Ernest G. Treat*	Republican	
Cayuga	2nd	George S. Fordyce*	Republican	
Chautauqua	1st	J. Samuel Fowler*	Republican	
Chautauqua	2nd	S. Frederick Nixon*	Republican	re-elected Speaker
Chemung		Charles H. Knipp*	Republican	
Chenango		Jotham P. Allds*	Republican	Majority Leader
Clinton		John F. O'Brien	Republican	
Columbia		Sanford W. Smith	Republican	
Cortland		Henry A. Dickinson	Republican	
Delaware		Delos Axtell*	Republican	
Dutchess	1st	John T. Smith*	Republican	
Dutchess	2nd	Francis G. Landon	Republican	
Erie	1st	John H. Bradley*	Democrat	
Erie	2nd	Edward R. O'Malley	Republican	
Erie	3rd	George Geoghan*	Democrat	
Erie	4th	William Schneider	Republican	
Erie	5th	Charles F. Brooks	Republican	
Erie	6th	George Ruehl	Republican	
Erie	7th	John K. Patton*	Republican	
Erie	8th	Elijah Cook*	Republican	
Essex		James M. Graeff	Republican	
Franklin		Halbert D. Stevens*	Republican	
Fulton and Hamilton		William Harris*	Republican	
Genesee		John J. Ellis*	Republican	
Greene		William W. Rider	Democrat	
Herkimer		Samuel M. Allston	Republican	
Jefferson	1st	Morgan Bryan*	Republican	
Jefferson	2nd	Charles O. Roberts*	Republican	
Kings	1st	John Hill Morgan*	Republican	
Kings	2nd	John McKeown*	Democrat	
Kings	3rd	James J. McInerney*	Democrat	
Kings	4th	Charles H. Cotton*	Republican	
Kings	5th	Abram C. DeGraw*	Republican	
Kings	6th	John Harvey Waite*	Republican	
Kings	7th	John D. Holsten*	Democrat	
Kings	8th	John C. L. Daly	Democrat	
Kings	9th	William P. Fitzpatrick	Democrat	
Kings	10th	John Rainey	Republican	
Kings	11th	Waldo R. Blackwell	Republican	
Kings	12th	Frank J. Price*	Republican	
Kings	13th	Thomas F. Mathews	Democrat	
Kings	14th	Thomas P. Hawkins*	Democrat	
Kings	15th	Charles Juengst*	Democrat	
Kings	16th	Gustavus C. Weber	Republican	
Kings	17th	Harris Wilson*	Republican	
Kings	18th	Jacob D. Remsen*	Republican	
Kings	19th	Conrad Hasenflug*	Democrat	
Kings	20th	William F. Delaney*	Democrat	
Kings	21st	Joseph H. Adams*	Republican	
Lewis		John L. Smith*	Republican	
Livingston		Otto Kelsey*	Republican	
Madison		Robert J. Fish*	Republican	
Monroe	1st	Merton E. Lewis*	Republican	
Monroe	2nd	Adolph J. Rodenbeck*	Republican	
Monroe	3rd	Richard Gardiner*	Republican	
Monroe	4th	Isaac W. Salyerds	Republican	
Montgomery		Alphonso Walrath*	Republican	
New York	1st	Michael Halpin*	Democrat	
New York	2nd	James A. Rierdon*	Democrat	
New York	3rd	Wauhope Lynn	Democrat	
New York	4th	William H. Burns	Democrat	
New York	5th	Nelson H. Henry*	Republican	
New York	6th	Timothy P. Sullivan*	Democrat	
New York	7th	James E. Duross	Democrat	
New York	8th	Charles S. Adler	Republican	
New York	9th	William H. Wilson	Democrat	died on March 27, 1901
New York	10th	Julius Harburger*	Democrat	
New York	11th	Michael J. Dempsey	Democrat	
New York	12th	Leon Sanders*	Democrat	
New York	13th	Richard S. Reilley	Democrat	
New York	14th	Louis Meister*	Democrat	
New York	15th	James E. Smith*	Democrat	
New York	16th	Samuel Prince*	Democrat	
New York	17th	James J. Fitzgerald*	Democrat	
New York	18th	George P. Richter	Democrat	
New York	19th	Julius H. Seymour	Republican	
New York	20th	Henry C. Honeck*	Democrat	
New York	21st	William S. Bennet	Republican	
New York	22nd	Joseph Baum*	Democrat	
New York	23rd	William H. Smith	Republican	
New York	24th	Leo P. Ulmann	Democrat	
New York	25th	John A. Weekes Jr.*	Republican	
New York	26th	John J. O'Connell*	Democrat	
New York	27th	Gherardi Davis*	Republican	
New York	28th	John T. Dooling	Democrat	
New York	29th	Hal Bell	Republican	
New York	30th	Samuel F. Hyman*	Democrat	
New York	31st	Arthur L. Sherer	Republican	
New York	32nd	John Poth*	Democrat	
New York	33rd	John J. Egan*	Democrat	
New York	34th	John J. Scanlon*	Democrat	
New York	35th	Henry Bruckner	Democrat	
Niagara	1st	John T. Darrison*	Republican	
Niagara	2nd	John H. Leggett	Republican	
Oneida	1st	Michael J. McQuade	Republican	
Oneida	2nd	Fred J. Brill	Republican	
Oneida	3rd	Edward M. Marson*	Republican	
Onondaga	1st	Edward V. Baker*	Republican	
Onondaga	2nd	Frederick D. Traub	Republican	
Onondaga	3rd	Martin L. Cadin	Republican	
Onondaga	4th	Fred W. Hammond	Republican	
Ontario		Jean L. Burnett*	Republican	
Orange	1st	John Orr	Republican	
Orange	2nd	Louis Bedell*	Republican	
Orleans		William W. Phipps*	Republican	
Oswego	1st	Thomas D. Lewis*	Republican	
Oswego	2nd	Thomas M. Costello*	Republican	
Otsego		Andrew R. Smith*	Republican	
Putnam		William W. Everett*	Republican	
Queens	1st	Luke A. Keenan	Democrat	
Queens	2nd	Eugene F. Vacheron	Republican	
Queens and Nassau		George W. Doughty*	Republican	
Rensselaer	1st	Hugh Galbraith*	Republican	
Rensselaer	2nd	John F. Ahearn*	Republican	
Rensselaer	3rd	Charles W. Reynolds	Republican	
Richmond		Calvin D. Van Name	Democrat	
Rockland		George Dickey	Democrat	
St. Lawrence	1st	Charles S. Plank*	Republican	
St. Lawrence	2nd	Benjamin A. Babcock*	Republican	
Saratoga		William K. Mansfield	Republican	
Schenectady		Andrew J. McMillan*	Republican	
Schoharie		Daniel D. Frisbie*	Democrat	Minority Leader
Schuyler		Olin T. Nye	Republican	
Seneca		John Kaiser Jr.	Democrat	
Steuben	1st	Frank C. Platt*	Republican	
Steuben	2nd	Hyatt C. Hatch*	Republican	
Suffolk	1st	Joseph N. Hallock*	Republican	
Suffolk	2nd	George A. Robinson	Republican	
Sullivan		Edwin R. Dusinbery*	Republican	
Tioga		Edwin S. Hanford	Republican	
Tompkins		Benn Conger*	Republican	
Ulster	1st	Robert A. Snyder*	Republican	
Ulster	2nd	Solomon P. Thorn	Republican	
Warren		Charles H. Hitchcock*	Republican	
Washington		Samuel B. Irwin*	Republican	
Wayne		Frederick W. Griffith*	Republican	
Westchester	1st	William C. Mains	Republican	
Westchester	2nd	Alford W. Cooley*	Republican	
Westchester	3rd	James K. Apgar*	Republican	
Wyoming		Charles J. Gardner*	Republican	died on May 7, 1901
Yates		Fred U. Swarts	Republican	

=== Employees ===
- Clerk: Archie E. Baxter
- Assistant Clerk: Ray B. Smith

== Sources ==
- Official New York from Cleveland to Hughes by Charles Elliott Fitch (Hurd Publishing Co., New York and Buffalo, 1911, Vol. IV; see pg. 343f for assemblymen; and 364 for senators)
- CANDIDATES IN THE CITY in NYT on October 14, 1900
- PROCEEDINGS IN BOTH HOUSES in NYT on January 3, 1901
- VOTE ON REPEAL OF PIGEON SHOOTING LAW in NYT on May 7, 1901
- REPUBLICAN INCREASE IN THE ASSEMBLY; ...Republicans Elect ... Senators in the Thirtieth and Forty-third Districts to Fill Vacancies in NYT on November 6, 1901
