= 123rd New York State Legislature =

New York state legislative session

←	122nd	124th	→
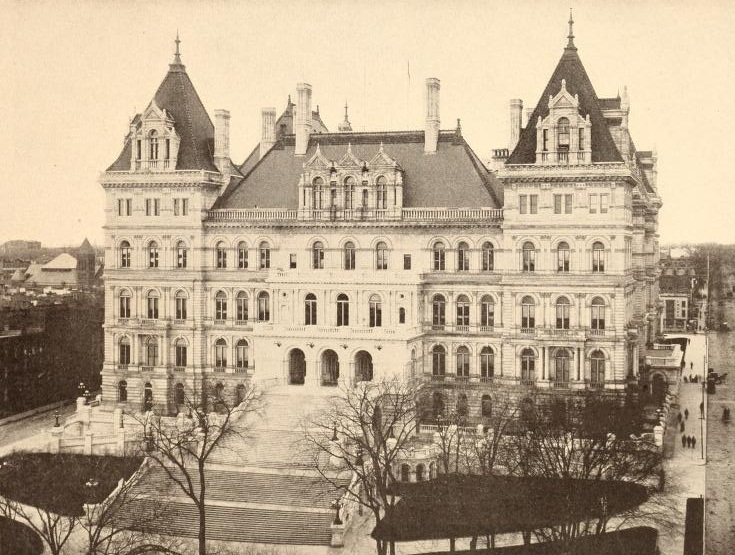
- New York State Capitol (1900)

Overview
- Legislative body: New York State Legislature
- Jurisdiction: New York, United States
- Term: January 1 – December 31, 1900

Senate
- Members: 50
- President: Lt. Gov. Timothy L. Woodruff (R)
- Temporary President: Timothy E. Ellsworth (R)
- Party control: Republican (27-23)

Assembly
- Members: 150
- Speaker: S. Frederick Nixon (R)
- Party control: Republican (93-57)

Sessions
- 1st: January 3 – April 6, 1900

The 123rd New York State Legislature, consisting of the New York State Senate and the New York State Assembly, met from January 3 to April 6, 1900, during the second year of Theodore Roosevelt's governorship, in Albany.

== Background ==
Under the provisions of the New York Constitution of 1894, 50 Senators and 150 assemblymen were elected in single-seat districts; senators for a two-year term, assemblymen for a one-year term. The senatorial districts were made up of entire counties, except New York County (twelve districts), Kings County (seven districts), Erie County (three districts) and Monroe County (two districts). The Assembly districts were made up of contiguous area, all within the same county.

At this time there were two major political parties: the Republican Party and the Democratic Party.

== Elections ==
The New York state election, 1899, was held on November 7. No statewide elective offices were up for election.

== Sessions ==
The Legislature met for the regular session at the State Capitol in Albany on January 3, 1900, and adjourned on April 6.

S. Frederick Nixon (R) was re-elected Speaker, with 92 votes against 57 for J. Franklin Barnes (D).

== State Senate ==
=== Districts ===
- 1st District: Richmond and Suffolk counties
- 2nd District: Queens and Nassau counties
- 3rd District: 1st, 2nd, 3rd, 4th, 5th and 6th Ward of Brooklyn, as constituted in 1894
- 4th District: 7th, 13th, 19th and 21st Ward of Brooklyn, as constituted in 1894
- 5th District: 8th, 10th, 12th and 30th Ward of Brooklyn, and the annexed former Town of Gravesend, as constituted in 1894
- 6th District: 9th, 11th, 20th and 22nd Ward of Brooklyn, as constituted in 1894
- 7th District: 14th, 15th, 16th and 17th Ward of Brooklyn, as constituted in 1894
- 8th District: 23rd, 24th, 25th and 29th Ward of Brooklyn; and the annexed former Town of Flatlands, as constituted in 1894
- 9th District: 18th, 26th, 27th and 28th Ward of Brooklyn, as constituted in 1894
- 10th, 11th, 12th, 13th, 14th, 15th, 16th, 17th, 18th, 19th, 20th and 21st District: Parts of the City of New York, defined geographically by their bordering streets, regardless of Wards or Assembly districts
- 22nd District: Westchester County
- 23rd District: Orange and Rockland counties
- 24th District: Columbia, Dutchess and Putnam and counties
- 25th District: Greene and Ulster counties
- 26th District: Chenango, Delaware and Sullivan counties
- 27th District: Fulton, Hamilton, Montgomery and Schoharie counties
- 28th District: Saratoga, Schenectady and Washington counties
- 29th District: Albany County
- 30th District: Rensselaer County
- 31st District: Clinton, Essex and Warren counties
- 32nd District: Franklin and St. Lawrence counties
- 33rd District: Otsego and Herkimer counties
- 34th District: Oneida County
- 35th District: Jefferson and Lewis counties
- 36th District: Onondaga County
- 37th District: Oswego and Madison counties
- 38th District: Broome, Cortland and Tioga counties
- 39th District: Cayuga and Seneca counties
- 40th District: Chemung, Schuyler and Tompkins counties
- 41st District: Steuben and Yates counties
- 42nd District: Ontario and Wayne counties
- 43rd District: 4th, 6th, 7th, 8th, 12th, 13th, 14th, 16th, 17th and 18th Ward of Rochester; and the towns of Brighton, Henrietta, Irondequoit, Menden, Penfield, Perinton, Pittsford, Rush and Webster, in Monroe County
- 44th District: 1st, 2nd, 3rd, 5th, 9th, 10th, 11th, 15th, 19th and 20th Ward of Rochester; and the towns of Chili, Clarkson, Gates, Greece, Hamlin, Ogden, Parma, Riga, Sweden and Wheatland, in Monroe County
- 45th District: Genesee, Niagara and Orleans counties
- 46th District: Allegany, Livingston and Wyoming counties
- 47th District: 1st, 2nd, 3rd, 6th, 15th, 19th, 20th, 21st, 22nd, 23rd and 24th Ward of Buffalo
- 48th District: 4th, 5th, 7th, 8th, 9th, 10th, 11th, 12th, 13th, 14th and 16th Ward of Buffalo
- 49th District: 17th, 18th and 25th Ward of the City of Buffalo; and all area in Erie County outside Buffalo
- 50th District: Cattaraugus and Chautauqua counties

Note: In 1897, New York County (the boroughs of Manhattan and Bronx), Kings County (the borough of Brooklyn), Richmond County (the borough of Staten Island) and the Western part of Queens County (the borough of Queens) were consolidated into the present-day City of New York. The Eastern part of Queens County (the non-consolidated part) was separated in 1899 as Nassau County. Parts of the 1st and 2nd Assembly districts of Westchester County were annexed by New York City in 1895, and became part of the Borough of the Bronx in 1898.

=== Members ===
The asterisk (*) denotes members of the previous Legislature who continued in office as members of this Legislature.

Note: For brevity, the chairmanships omit the words "...the Committee on (the)..."

District	Senator	Party	Notes
1st	John L. Havens*	Democrat	
2nd	James Norton*	Democrat	
3rd	Thomas H. Cullen*	Democrat	
4th	David Floyd Davis*	Republican	Chairman of Military Affairs
5th	Michael J. Coffey*	Democrat	
6th	William J. La Roche*	Democrat	
7th	Patrick H. McCarren*	Democrat	
8th	Henry Marshall*	Republican	Chairman of Printed and Engrossed Bills
9th	Joseph Wagner*	Democrat	
10th	John F. Ahearn*	Democrat	
11th	Timothy D. Sullivan*	Democrat	
12th	Samuel J. Foley*	Democrat	
13th	Bernard F. Martin*	Democrat	
14th	Thomas F. Grady*	Democrat	Minority Leader
15th	Nathaniel A. Elsberg*	Republican	Chairman of Revision
16th	Louis Munzinger*	Democrat	
17th	George W. Plunkitt*	Democrat	
18th	Maurice Featherson*	Democrat	
19th	John Ford*	Republican	Chairman of Commerce and Navigation
20th	Thomas F. Donnelly*	Democrat	
21st	Richard H. Mitchell*	Democrat	
22nd	William J. Graney*	Democrat	
23rd	Louis F. Goodsell*	Republican	Chairman of Affairs of Villages
24th	Henry S. Ambler*	Republican	Chairman of Agriculture
25th	Jacob Rice*	Democrat	
26th	William L. Thornton*	Republican	Chairman of Privileges and Elections
27th	Hobart Krum*	Republican	Chairman of Taxation and Retrenchment
28th	Edgar T. Brackett*	Republican	Chairman of Judiciary
29th	Curtis N. Douglas*	Democrat	
30th	Frank M. Boyce*	Democrat	
31st	George Chahoon*	Republican	Chairman of Trades and Manufactures
32nd	George R. Malby*	Republican	Chairman of Codes
33rd	James D. Feeter*	Republican	Chairman of Internal Affairs of Towns and Counties
34th	Henry J. Coggeshall*	Republican	Chairman of Miscellaneous Corporations
35th	Elon R. Brown*	Republican	Chairman of Forest, Fish, and Game Laws
36th	Horace White*	Republican	Chairman of Public Education
37th	Nevada N. Stranahan*	Republican	Chairman of Affairs of Cities
38th	William Elting Johnson*	Republican	Chairman of Public Health
39th	Benjamin M. Wilcox*	Republican	Chairman of Penal Institutions
40th	Charles T. Willis*	Republican	Chairman of Indian Affairs
41st	Franklin D. Sherwood*	Republican	Chairman of Public Printing
42nd	John Raines*	Republican	Chairman of Railroads
43rd	Cornelius R. Parsons*	Republican	Chairman of Insurance
44th	William W. Armstrong*	Republican	Chairman of Roads and Bridges
45th	Timothy E. Ellsworth*	Republican	President pro tempore; Chairman of Rules
46th	Lester H. Humphrey*	Republican	Chairman of Banks
47th	William F. Mackey*	Democrat	
48th	Samuel J. Ramsperger*	Democrat	
49th	George Allen Davis*	Republican	Chairman of Canals
50th	Frank W. Higgins*	Republican	Chairman of Finance

=== Employees ===
- Clerk: James S. Whipple
- Sergeant-at-Arms: Henry Jacquilard
- Doorkeeper: John E. Gorss
- Stenographer: A. B. Sackett
- Journal Clerk: Lafayette B. Gleason
- Index Clerk: Ernest A. Fay
- Clerk to the Committee on Finance: Girvease A. Matteson

== State Assembly ==
Note: For brevity, the chairmanships omit the words "...the Committee on (the)..."

=== Assemblymen ===
District		Assemblymen	Party	Notes
Albany	1st	William L. Coughtry*	Republican	Chairman of Insurance
Albany	2nd	James B. McEwan*	Republican	Chairman of Banks
Albany	3rd	George T. Kelly*	Democrat	
Albany	4th	Edward McCreary	Republican	
Allegany		Almanzo W. Litchard*	Republican	Chairman of Agriculture
Broome	1st	James T. Rogers*	Republican	Chairman of Excise
Broome	2nd	John H. Swift	Republican	
Cattaraugus	1st	William E. Wheeler	Republican	Chairman of Public Lands and Forestry
Cattaraugus	2nd	Albert T. Fancher*	Republican	Chairman of Indian Affairs
Cayuga	1st	Ernest G. Treat	Republican	
Cayuga	2nd	George S. Fordyce*	Republican	Chairman of Public Printing
Chautauqua	1st	J. Samuel Fowler*	Republican	Chairman of State Prisons
Chautauqua	2nd	S. Frederick Nixon*	Republican	re-elected Speaker; Chairman of Rules
Chemung		Charles H. Knipp	Republican	
Chenango		Jotham P. Allds*	Republican	Majority Leader; Chairman of Ways and Means
Clinton		Charles E. Johnson	Republican	
Columbia		Martin M. Kittel	Republican	
Cortland		George S. Sands*	Republican	
Delaware		Delos Axtell*	Republican	Chairman of Fisheries and Game
Dutchess	1st	John T. Smith*	Republican	
Dutchess	2nd	William A. Tripp*	Republican	Chairman of Public Institutions
Erie	1st	John H. Bradley	Democrat	
Erie	2nd	Henry W. Hill*	Republican	Chairman of Canals
Erie	3rd	George Geoghan	Democrat	
Erie	4th	William Metzler	Republican	
Erie	5th	Henry Streifler*	Democrat	
Erie	6th	Nicholas J. Miller	Republican	
Erie	7th	John K. Patton*	Republican	Chairman of Federal Relations
Erie	8th	Elijah Cook	Republican	
Essex		Orlando Beede*	Republican	
Franklin		Halbert D. Stevens	Republican	
Fulton and Hamilton		William Harris	Republican	
Genesee		John J. Ellis*	Republican	Chairman of Affairs of Villages
Greene		Sylvester B. Sage	Democrat	
Herkimer		Erwin E. Kelley*	Republican	
Jefferson	1st	Morgan Bryan*	Republican	
Jefferson	2nd	Charles O. Roberts*	Republican	
Kings	1st	John Hill Morgan	Republican	
Kings	2nd	John McKeown*	Democrat	
Kings	3rd	James J. McInerney*	Democrat	
Kings	4th	Charles H. Cotton*	Republican	Chairman of Military Affairs
Kings	5th	Abram C. DeGraw*	Republican	Chairman of Taxation and Retrenchment
Kings	6th	John Harvey Waite	Republican	
Kings	7th	John D. Holsten	Democrat	
Kings	8th	Thomas J. Farrell*	Democrat	
Kings	9th	John J. Cain*	Democrat	
Kings	10th	Charles E. Fiske	Democrat	
Kings	11th	Joseph A. Guider*	Democrat	
Kings	12th	Frank J. Price	Republican	
Kings	13th	George Siems*	Democrat	
Kings	14th	Thomas P. Hawkins	Democrat	
Kings	15th	Charles Juengst*	Democrat	
Kings	16th	Edward C. Brennan*	Republican	Chairman of Commerce and Navigation
Kings	17th	Harris Wilson*	Republican	
Kings	18th	Jacob D. Remsen	Republican	
Kings	19th	Conrad Hasenflug	Democrat	
Kings	20th	William F. Delaney	Democrat	
Kings	21st	Joseph H. Adams	Republican	
Lewis		John L. Smith	Republican	
Livingston		Otto Kelsey*	Republican	Chairman of Affairs of Cities
Madison		Robert J. Fish*	Republican	Chairman of Judiciary
Monroe	1st	Merton E. Lewis*	Republican	Chairman of Public Education
Monroe	2nd	Adolph J. Rodenbeck*	Republican	Chairman of Claims
Monroe	3rd	Richard Gardiner*	Republican	
Monroe	4th	Benjamin F. Gleason*	Republican	
Montgomery		Alphonso Walrath	Republican	
New York	1st	Michael Halpin	Democrat	
New York	2nd	James A. Rierdon*	Democrat	
New York	3rd	Michael T. Sharkey*	Democrat	
New York	4th	Patrick H. Roche*	Democrat	
New York	5th	Nelson H. Henry*	Republican	Chairman of Public Health
New York	6th	Timothy P. Sullivan*	Democrat	
New York	7th	John F. Maher*	Democrat	
New York	8th	Isidor Cohn	Democrat	
New York	9th	N. Taylor Phillips*	Democrat	
New York	10th	Julius Harburger*	Democrat	
New York	11th	John J. O'Connor*	Democrat	
New York	12th	Leon Sanders*	Democrat	
New York	13th	Patrick F. Trainor*	Democrat	
New York	14th	Louis Meister*	Democrat	
New York	15th	James E. Smith*	Democrat	
New York	16th	Samuel Prince	Democrat	
New York	17th	James J. Fitzgerald	Democrat	
New York	18th	Charles P. Dillon*	Democrat	
New York	19th	Perez M. Stewart	Ind. Dem.	
New York	20th	Henry C. Honeck	Democrat	
New York	21st	Edward H. Fallows*	Republican	Chairman of Privileges and Elections
New York	22nd	Joseph Baum*	Democrat	
New York	23rd	Maurice M. Minton	Democrat	
New York	24th	John B. Fitzgerald*	Democrat	
New York	25th	John A. Weekes Jr.	Republican	Chairman of Codes
New York	26th	John J. O'Connell*	Democrat	
New York	27th	Gherardi Davis*	Republican	
New York	28th	Joseph I. Green*	Democrat	
New York	29th	Moses R. Ryttenberg	Democrat	
New York	30th	Samuel F. Hyman	Democrat	
New York	31st	vacant		Assemblyman-elect Edward C. Stone (D) died on December 8, 1899
New York	31st	Samuel S. Slater	Republican	elected on January 23 to fill vacancy
New York	32nd	John Poth Jr.*	Democrat	
New York	33rd	John J. Egan*	Democrat	
New York	34th	John J. Scanlon	Democrat	
New York	35th	William E. Morris	Democrat	
Niagara	1st	John T. Darrison*	Republican	Chairman of Unfinished Business
Niagara	2nd	Jay S. Rowe*	Republican	
Oneida	1st	William J. Sullivan*	Democrat	
Oneida	2nd	Louis M. Martin*	Republican	Chairman of Internal Affairs
Oneida	3rd	Edward M. Marson	Republican	
Onondaga	1st	Edward V. Baker	Republican	
Onondaga	2nd	William Herrick	Democrat	
Onondaga	3rd	Abraham Z. Hyman	Democrat	
Onondaga	4th	John T. Delaney*	Republican	
Ontario		Jean L. Burnett*	Republican	Chairman of General Laws
Orange	1st	James G. Graham*	Republican	
Orange	2nd	Louis Bedell*	Republican	Chairman of Railroads
Orleans		William W. Phipps	Republican	
Oswego	1st	Thomas D. Lewis*	Republican	Chairman of Trades and Manufactures
Oswego	2nd	Thomas M. Costello*	Republican	Chairman of Labor and Industries
Otsego		Andrew R. Smith	Republican	
Putnam		William W. Everett	Republican	
Queens	1st	Charles C. Wissel*	Democrat	
Queens	2nd	Cyrus B. Gale*	Democrat	
Queens and Nassau		George W. Doughty*	Republican	
Rensselaer	1st	Hugh Galbraith	Republican	
Rensselaer	2nd	John F. Ahearn	Republican	
Rensselaer	3rd	Michael Russell*	Republican	Chairman of Charitable and Religious Societies
Richmond		George Metcalfe	Democrat	
Rockland		Frank P. Demarest	Democrat	
St. Lawrence	1st	Charles S. Plank	Republican	
St. Lawrence	2nd	Benjamin A. Babcock*	Republican	
Saratoga		George H. West*	Republican	
Schenectady		Andrew J. McMillan*	Republican	
Schoharie		Daniel D. Frisbie	Democrat	
Schuyler		J. Franklin Barnes	Democrat	Minority Leader
Seneca		Israel Y. Larzelere	Republican	
Steuben	1st	Frank C. Platt	Republican	Chairman of Soldiers' Home
Steuben	2nd	Hyatt C. Hatch*	Republican	Chairman of Revision
Suffolk	1st	Joseph N. Hallock*	Republican	
Suffolk	2nd	Regis H. Post*	Republican	
Sullivan		Edwin R. Dusinbery	Republican	
Tioga		Daniel P. Witter*	Republican	Chairman of Electricity, Gas and Water Supply
Tompkins		Benn Conger	Republican	
Ulster	1st	Robert A. Snyder*	Republican	Chairman of Printed and Engrossed Bills
Ulster	2nd	Thomas Snyder	Republican	
Warren		Charles H. Hitchcock*	Republican	
Washington		Samuel B. Irwin	Republican	
Wayne		Frederick W. Griffith	Republican	
Westchester	1st	John J. Sloane*	Democrat	
Westchester	2nd	Alford W. Cooley	Republican	
Westchester	3rd	James K. Apgar*	Republican	
Wyoming		Charles J. Gardner	Republican	
Yates		Edward M. Sawyer*	Republican	

=== Employees ===
- Clerk: Archie E. Baxter
- Sergeant-at-Arms: Frank W. Johnston
- Doorkeeper: Thomas F. Murphy
- First Assistant Doorkeeper: Charles R. Hotaling
- Second Assistant Doorkeeper: Roswell P. Warren
- Stenographer: Henry C. Lammert
- Assistant Clerk: Ray B. Smith
- Librarian: John R. Yale
- Assistant Doorkeeper: Eugene L. Demers

== Sources ==
- The New York Red Book by Edgar L. Murlin (James B. Lyon, Albany, 1900; see: senators bios, pg. 59–95; assemblymen's bios, pg. 96–186; senators' portraits, after pg. 64; assemblymen's portraits, after pg. 96)
- Official New York from Cleveland to Hughes by Charles Elliott Fitch (Hurd Publishing Co., New York and Buffalo, 1911, Vol. IV; see pg. 341ff for assemblymen; and 364 for senators)
- The World Almanac and Encyclopedia (1900; pg. 447)
- The World Almanac and Encyclopedia (1900; pg. 448)
- NEW YORK LEGISLATURE in NYT on January 3, 1900
- THE LEGISLATURE MEETS in NYT on January 4, 1900
