= 128th New York State Legislature =

New York state legislative session

←	127th	129th	→
- New York State Capitol (2009)

Overview
- Legislative body: New York State Legislature
- Jurisdiction: New York, United States
- Term: January 1 – December 31, 1905

Senate
- Members: 50
- President: Lt. Gov. M. Linn Bruce (R)
- Temporary President: John Raines (R)
- Party control: Republican (36-14)

Assembly
- Members: 150
- Speaker: S. Frederick Nixon (R)
- Party control: Republican (104-46)

Sessions
- 1st: January 4 – May 5, 1905
- 2nd: June 21 – July 20, 1905

The 128th New York State Legislature, consisting of the New York State Senate and the New York State Assembly, met from January 4 to July 20, 1905, during the first year of Frank W. Higgins's governorship, in Albany.

== Background ==
Under the provisions of the New York Constitution of 1894, 50 Senators and 150 assemblymen were elected in single-seat districts; senators for a two-year term, assemblymen for a one-year term. The senatorial districts were made up of entire counties, except New York County (twelve districts), Kings County (seven districts), Erie County (three districts), and Monroe County (two districts). The Assembly districts were made up of contiguous areas, all within the same county.

At this time there were two major political parties: the Republican Party and the Democratic Party. The Social Democratic Party, the Prohibition Party, the Socialist Labor Party and the People's Party also nominated tickets.

== Elections ==
The 1904 New York state election, was held on November 8. Lt. Gov. Frank W. Higgins was elected Governor; and Matthew Linn Bruce was elected Lieutenant Governor; both Republicans. Of the other seven statewide elective office up for election, six were carried by the Republicans, and one by a Democrat. The approximate party strength at this election, as expressed by the vote for Governor, was: Republicans 813,000; Democrats 732,000; Social Democrats 36,000; Prohibition 21,000; Socialist Labor 9,000; and People's Party 6,000.

== Sessions ==
The Legislature met for the regular session at the State Capitol in Albany on January 4, 1905; and adjourned on May 5.

S. Frederick Nixon (R) was re-elected Speaker.

John Raines (R) was re-elected President pro tempore of the State Senate.

On January 17, the Legislature re-elected Chauncey M. Depew (R) as U.S. Senator from New York for a second six-year term, beginning on March 4, 1905.

Clerk of the Senate James S. Whipple was appointed Forest, Fish and Game Commissioner, and resigned on May 20. Assistant Clerk Lafayette B. Gleason was appointed by Lieutenant Governor M. Linn Bruce as Acting Clerk.

The Legislature met for a special session at the State Capitol in Albany to consider the removal from office of New York Supreme Court Justice Warren B. Hooker. Hooker was acquitted by the Legislature, remained on the bench and the Legislature adjourned July 20, 1905.

On June 21, Gleason was elected Clerk of the Senate for the special session, and the session of 1906.

== State Senate ==
=== Districts ===
- 1st District: Richmond and Suffolk counties
- 2nd District: Queens and Nassau counties
- 3rd District: 1st, 2nd, 3rd, 4th, 5th and 6th Ward of Brooklyn, as constituted in 1894
- 4th District: 7th, 13th, 19th and 21st Ward of Brooklyn, as constituted in 1894
- 5th District: 8th, 10th, 12th and 30th Ward of Brooklyn, and the annexed former Town of Gravesend, as constituted in 1894
- 6th District: 9th, 11th, 20th and 22nd Ward of Brooklyn, as constituted in 1894
- 7th District: 14th, 15th, 16th and 17th Ward of Brooklyn, as constituted in 1894
- 8th District: 23rd, 24th, 25th and 29th Ward of Brooklyn; and the annexed former Town of Flatlands, as constituted in 1894
- 9th District: 18th, 26th, 27th and 28th Ward of Brooklyn, as constituted in 1894
- 10th, 11th, 12th, 13th, 14th, 15th, 16th, 17th, 18th, 19th, 20th and 21st District: Parts of the City of New York, defined geographically by their bordering streets, regardless of Wards or Assembly districts
- 22nd District: Westchester County
- 23rd District: Orange and Rockland counties
- 24th District: Columbia, Dutchess and Putnam and counties
- 25th District: Greene and Ulster counties
- 26th District: Chenango, Delaware and Sullivan counties
- 27th District: Fulton, Hamilton, Montgomery and Schoharie counties
- 28th District: Saratoga, Schenectady and Washington counties
- 29th District: Albany County
- 30th District: Rensselaer County
- 31st District: Clinton, Essex and Warren counties
- 32nd District: Franklin and St. Lawrence counties
- 33rd District: Otsego and Herkimer counties
- 34th District: Oneida County
- 35th District: Jefferson and Lewis counties
- 36th District: Onondaga County
- 37th District: Oswego and Madison counties
- 38th District: Broome, Cortland and Tioga counties
- 39th District: Cayuga and Seneca counties
- 40th District: Chemung, Schuyler and Tompkins counties
- 41st District: Steuben and Yates counties
- 42nd District: Ontario and Wayne counties
- 43rd District: 4th, 6th, 7th, 8th, 12th, 13th, 14th, 16th, 17th and 18th Ward of Rochester; and the towns of Brighton, Henrietta, Irondequoit, Menden, Penfield, Perinton, Pittsford, Rush and Webster, in Monroe County
- 44th District: 1st, 2nd, 3rd, 5th, 9th, 10th, 11th, 15th, 19th and 20th Ward of Rochester; and the towns of Chili, Clarkson, Gates, Greece, Hamlin, Ogden, Parma, Riga, Sweden and Wheatland, in Monroe County
- 45th District: Genesee, Niagara and Orleans counties
- 46th District: Allegany, Livingston and Wyoming counties
- 47th District: 1st, 2nd, 3rd, 6th, 15th, 19th, 20th, 21st, 22nd, 23rd and 24th Ward of Buffalo
- 48th District: 4th, 5th, 7th, 8th, 9th, 10th, 11th, 12th, 13th, 14th and 16th Ward of Buffalo
- 49th District: 17th, 18th and 25th Ward of the City of Buffalo; and all area in Erie County outside Buffalo
- 50th District: Cattaraugus and Chautauqua counties

Note: In 1897, New York County (the boroughs of Manhattan and Bronx), Kings County (the borough of Brooklyn), Richmond County (the borough of Staten Island) and the Western part of Queens County (the borough of Queens) were consolidated into the present-day City of New York. The Eastern part of Queens County (the non-consolidated part) was separated in 1899 as Nassau County. Parts of the 1st and 2nd Assembly districts of Westchester County were annexed by New York City in 1895, and became part of the Borough of the Bronx in 1898.

=== Members ===
The asterisk (*) denotes members of the previous Legislature who continued in office as members of this Legislature. James J. Kehoe changed from the Assembly to the Senate.

District	Senator	Party	Notes
1st	Carll S. Burr Jr.	Republican	
2nd	Luke A. Keenan*	Democrat	re-elected
3rd	Thomas H. Cullen*	Democrat	re-elected
4th	John Drescher Jr.	Republican	
5th	James J. Kehoe*	Democrat	
6th	Frank J. Gardner	Republican	
7th	Patrick H. McCarren*	Democrat	re-elected
8th	Charles Cooper	Republican	
9th	Conrad Hasenflug	Democrat	
10th	Daniel J. Riordan*	Democrat	re-elected
11th	John C. Fitzgerald*	Democrat	re-elected
12th	Samuel J. Foley*	Democrat	re-elected
13th	Bernard F. Martin*	Democrat	re-elected
14th	Thomas F. Grady*	Democrat	re-elected; Minority Leader
15th	Nathaniel A. Elsberg*	Republican	re-elected
16th	Peter J. Dooling*	Democrat	re-elected; resigned on October 16, 1905
17th	Martin Saxe	Republican	
18th	Jacob Marks	Democrat	
19th	Alfred R. Page	Republican	
20th	James J. Frawley*	Democrat	re-elected
21st	John A. Hawkins*	Democrat	re-elected
22nd	Francis M. Carpenter*	Republican	re-elected
23rd	Louis F. Goodsell*	Republican	re-elected
24th	Henry S. Ambler*	Republican	re-elected; died on September 17, 1905
25th	John N. Cordts	Republican	
26th	Jotham P. Allds*	Republican	re-elected
27th	Spencer K. Warnick*	Republican	re-elected
28th	Edgar T. Brackett*	Republican	re-elected
29th	James B. McEwan*	Republican	re-elected
30th	William D. Barnes*	Republican	re-elected
31st	Spencer G. Prime*	Republican	re-elected
32nd	George R. Malby*	Republican	re-elected
33rd	Walter L. Brown*	Republican	re-elected
34th	Henry J. Coggeshall	Republican	
35th	George H. Cobb	Republican	
36th	Horace White*	Republican	re-elected
37th	Francis H. Gates*	Republican	re-elected
38th	Harvey D. Hinman	Republican	
39th	Benjamin M. Wilcox*	Republican	re-elected
40th	Owen Cassidy	Republican	
41st	William J. Tully	Republican	
42nd	John Raines*	Republican	re-elected; re-elected President pro tempore
43rd	Merton E. Lewis*	Republican	re-elected
44th	William W. Armstrong*	Republican	re-elected
45th	Irving L'Hommedieu*	Republican	re-elected
46th	Frederick C. Stevens*	Republican	re-elected
47th	Henry W. Hill*	Republican	re-elected
48th	Louis Fechter, Sr.	Republican	
49th	George Allen Davis*	Republican	re-elected
50th	Albert T. Fancher*	Republican	re-elected

=== Employees ===
- Clerk: James S. Whipple, resigned on May 20
  - Lafayette B. Gleason, elected on June 21
- Sergeant-at-Arms:
- Assistant Sergeant-at-Arms: Everett Brown
- Doorkeeper:
- Assistant Doorkeeper:
- Stenographer:

== State Assembly ==
=== Assemblymen ===
District		Assemblymen	Party	Notes
Albany	1st	Charles W. Mead*	Republican	
Albany	2nd	Abram S. Coon*	Republican	
Albany	3rd	William V. Cooke	Democrat	
Albany	4th	William J. Grattan*	Republican	
Allegany		Jesse S. Phillips*	Republican	
Broome	1st	James T. Rogers*	Republican	Majority Leader
Broome	2nd	Fred E. Allen*	Republican	
Cattaraugus	1st	Jasper E. Smith	Republican	
Cattaraugus	2nd	James C. Sheldon*	Republican	
Cayuga	1st	Judson W. Hapeman*	Republican	
Cayuga	2nd	J. Guernsey Allen	Republican	
Chautauqua	1st	Arthur C. Wade*	Republican	
Chautauqua	2nd	S. Frederick Nixon*	Republican	re-elected Speaker; died on October 10, 1905
Chemung		Sherman Moreland*	Republican	
Chenango		Charles L. Carrier	Republican	
Clinton		H. Wallace Knapp*	Republican	
Columbia		Edward W. Scovill*	Republican	
Cortland		Charles O. Newton	Republican	
Delaware		James R. Cowan*	Republican	
Dutchess	1st	John T. Smith*	Republican	
Dutchess	2nd	Augustus B. Gray	Republican	
Erie	1st	Charles J. Quinn*	Democrat	
Erie	2nd	Robert L. Cox*	Republican	
Erie	3rd	Frank S. Burzynski	Democrat	
Erie	4th	William C. Tenjost	Republican	
Erie	5th	Charles F. Brooks*	Republican	
Erie	6th	Frank W. Standart	Republican	
Erie	7th	John K. Patton*	Republican	
Erie	8th	Luther J. Shuttleworth	Republican	
Essex		Frank C. Hooper	Republican	
Franklin		Charles R. Matthews*	Republican	
Fulton and Hamilton		Frank C. Wood*	Republican	
Genesee		S. Percy Hooker*	Republican	
Greene		William C. Brady	Republican	
Herkimer		Abram B. Steele*	Republican	
Jefferson	1st	Albert Foster	Republican	
Jefferson	2nd	J. Frank La Rue*	Republican	
Kings	1st	Thomas O'Neill*	Republican	
Kings	2nd	John McKeown*	Democrat	
Kings	3rd	Thomas P. Reilly*	Democrat	
Kings	4th	Charles H. Cotton	Republican	
Kings	5th	Otto G. Foelker	Republican	
Kings	6th	Charles J. Dodd	Democrat	
Kings	7th	Michael J. Grady	Democrat	
Kings	8th	James A. Thompson	Democrat	
Kings	9th	James J. Byrne	Democrat	
Kings	10th	Charles F. Murphy	Republican	
Kings	11th	William S. Shanahan*	Democrat	
Kings	12th	Oscar L. Thonet*	Republican	
Kings	13th	Thomas F. Mathews*	Democrat	
Kings	14th	George W. Kavanagh	Democrat	
Kings	15th	Harry H. Dale*	Democrat	
Kings	16th	Richard C. Perry*	Republican	
Kings	17th	Edward C. Dowling*	Republican	
Kings	18th	Charles H. Fuller	Democrat	
Kings	19th	John Wolf*	Democrat	
Kings	20th	William H. Pendry	Republican	
Kings	21st	Charles H. Francisco	Republican	
Lewis		H. Elias Slocum*	Republican	
Livingston		James Wolcott Wadsworth Jr.	Republican	
Madison		Robert J. Fish*	Republican	
Monroe	1st	DeWitt C. Becker	Republican	
Monroe	2nd	Charles E. Ogden*	Republican	
Monroe	3rd	Charles E. Callahan*	Republican	
Monroe	4th	Albert P. Beebe	Republican	
Montgomery		William B. Charles*	Republican	
New York	1st	Thomas B. Caughlan*	Democrat	
New York	2nd	Al Smith*	Democrat	
New York	3rd	Richard J. Malloy	Democrat	
New York	4th	William H. Burns*	Democrat	
New York	5th	Leslie J. Tompkins	Democrat	
New York	6th	Charles Anderson*	Democrat	
New York	7th	Peter P. Sherry*	Democrat	
New York	8th	Louis Freidel	Republican	
New York	9th	Patrick H. Bird*	Democrat	
New York	10th	Frederick J. Etzel	Republican	
New York	11th	John J. Sammon	Democrat	
New York	12th	Edward Rosenstein*	Democrat	
New York	13th	John C. Hackett*	Democrat	
New York	14th	Albert C. Wiegand	Democrat	
New York	15th	Thomas J. McManus*	Democrat	
New York	16th	Gustave Hartman	Republican	
New York	17th	Michael J. Sheehy	Democrat	
New York	18th	Edward B. La Fetra	Democrat	
New York	19th	Mervin C. Stanley	Republican	
New York	20th	Peter L. Fitzsimons*	Democrat	
New York	21st	William Young	Republican	
New York	22nd	William H. Hornidge*	Democrat	
New York	23rd	Richard H. Smith	Democrat	
New York	24th	James J. Nugent	Democrat	
New York	25th	Ezra P. Prentice*	Republican	
New York	26th	M. J. Machacek	Democrat	
New York	27th	George B. Agnew*	Republican	
New York	28th	Emanuel S. Cahn*	Democrat	
New York	29th	Frederic E. Perham*	Republican	
New York	30th	Robert F. Wagner	Democrat	
New York	31st	Joseph Beihilf	Republican	
New York	32nd	Leopold Prince	Democrat	
New York	33rd	Jacob E. Salomon	Democrat	
New York	34th	William J. Ellis*	Democrat	
New York	35th	Peter J. Everett*	Democrat	
Niagara	1st	George F. Thompson*	Republican	
Niagara	2nd	John H. Leggett*	Republican	
Oneida	1st	Henry L. Gates	Republican	
Oneida	2nd	Jay H. Pratt*	Republican	
Oneida	3rd	John C. Evans*	Republican	
Onondaga	1st	Frank X. Wood*	Republican	
Onondaga	2nd	Edward Schoeneck*	Republican	
Onondaga	3rd	Martin L. Cadin*	Republican	
Onondaga	4th	Fred W. Hammond*	Republican	
Ontario		Jean L. Burnett*	Republican	
Orange	1st	William G. Hastings	Republican	
Orange	2nd	Louis Bedell*	Republican	
Orleans		Henry V. Wilson	Republican	
Oswego	1st	Thomas D. Lewis*	Republican	
Oswego	2nd	Fred G. Whitney*	Republican	
Otsego		Deloss E. Bass	Republican	
Putnam		John R. Yale*	Republican	
Queens	1st	Joseph Sullivan*	Democrat	
Queens	2nd	Theo. P. Wilsnack	Republican	
Queens and Nassau		William G. Miller	Republican	
Rensselaer	1st	Frank L. Stevens*	Republican	
Rensselaer	2nd	William V. Donovan*	Democrat	
Rensselaer	3rd	Calvin A. Gardner*	Republican	
Richmond		Arnold J. B. Wedemeyer	Democrat	
Rockland		Matthew Hurd*	Republican	
St. Lawrence	1st	Charles S. Plank*	Republican	
St. Lawrence	2nd	Edwin A. Merritt Jr.*	Republican	
Saratoga		George H. Whitney*	Republican	
Schenectady		William W. Wemple*	Republican	
Schoharie		George M. Palmer*	Democrat	Minority Leader
Schuyler		John W. Gurnett	Democrat	
Seneca		William J. Maier	Republican	
Steuben	1st	Frank C. Platt*	Republican	
Steuben	2nd	Jerry E. B. Santee*	Republican	
Suffolk	1st	Willis A. Reeve*	Republican	
Suffolk	2nd	Orlando Hubbs*	Republican	
Sullivan		Edward Bisland	Republican	
Tioga		Edwin S. Hanford*	Republican	
Tompkins		George E. Monroe*	Republican	
Ulster	1st	Charles T. Coutant*	Republican	
Ulster	2nd	William D. Cunningham*	Republican	
Warren		William R. Waddell	Republican	
Washington		James S. Parker*	Republican	
Wayne		Addison P. Smith*	Republican	
Westchester	1st	George N. Rigby*	Republican	
Westchester	2nd	J. Mayhew Wainwright*	Republican	
Westchester	3rd	James K. Apgar*	Republican	
Wyoming		Elmer E. Charles*	Republican	
Yates		Leonidas D. West	Republican	

=== Employees ===
- Clerk: Archie E. Baxter
- Assistant Clerk: Ray B. Smith
- Sergeant-at-Arms:
- Doorkeeper:
- First Assistant Doorkeeper:
- Second Assistant Doorkeeper:
- Stenographer:

== Sources ==
- Official New York from Cleveland to Hughes by Charles Elliott Fitch (Hurd Publishing Co., New York and Buffalo, 1911, Vol. IV; see pg. 350f for assemblymen; and 365f for senators)
- THE NEXT LEGISLATURE in NYT on November 9, 1904
- Journal of the Senate (128th Session) (special session; 1905)
- LEGISLATURE OPENS TODAY in NYT on January 4, 1905
