= Jean L. Burnett =

American politician

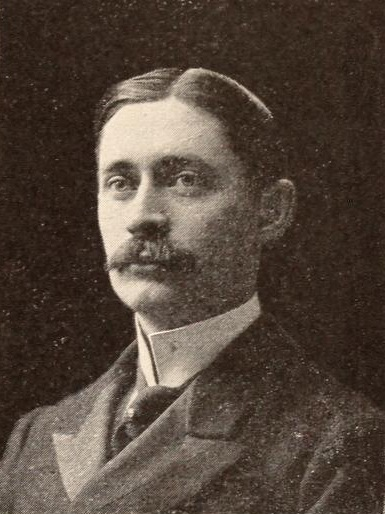
Jean L. Burnett (1900)

Jean La Rue Burnett (January 10, 1871 – February 26, 1907) was an American lawyer and politician from New York.

== Life ==
He was born on January 10, 1871, in Canandaigua, Ontario County, New York, the son of Perrine Burnett and Harriet E. (Rowley) Burnett. He graduated from Canandaigua Academy in 1889, and LL.B. from the University of Michigan Law School in 1892. Then he was admitted to the bar, and practiced law in Canandaigua.

He became the chief lieutenant of the local Republican boss John Raines who took Burnett along to Albany. In 1897, Burnett was Chief of the Revision Room of the State Assembly. He was a member of the New York State Assembly (Ontario Co.) in 1899, 1900, 1901, 1902, 1903, 1904, 1905, 1906 and 1907; and was Chairman of the Committee on General Laws from 1900 to 1902, and Chairman of the Committee on Affairs of Cities from 1903 to 1907.

He married Margaret Gillette, and they had two children: Margaret (born 1903), and Jean who was born on the day his father died.

Burnett died during the legislative session on February 26, 1907, at the Ten Eyck Hotel in Albany, New York, from pneumonia; and was buried at the Woodlawn Cemetery in Canandaigua.

== Sources ==
New York State Assembly
Preceded by Robert B. Simmons	New York State Assembly; Ontario County; 1899–1907	Succeeded by George B. Hemenway
