= Henry S. Ambler =

American politician

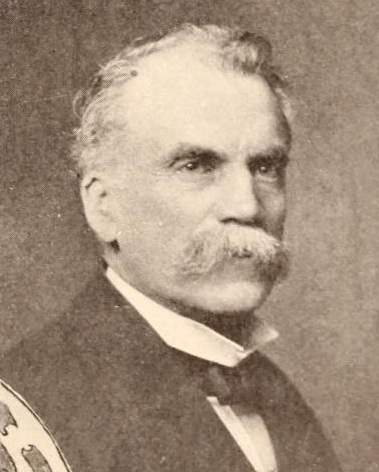
Henry S. Ambler (1902)

Henry S. Ambler (1836 – September 17, 1905) was an American politician from New York.

== Life ==
He was born in 1836 in New York City, the son of John Ambler. He worked on the family farm. He was Agent and Steward of the New York Institution for the Blind at Batavia from 1861 to 1866. Then he became a merchant, and later returned to the family farm.

He was Supervisor of the Town of Austerlitz for ten years. In 1896, he was appointed as Assistant State Commissioner of Agriculture.

Ambler was a member of the New York State Senate (24th D.) from 1899 until his death in 1905, sitting in the 122nd, 123rd, 124th, 125th, 126th, 127th and 128th New York State Legislatures.

He died on September 17, 1905, at the Ambler family farm in Austerlitz, Columbia County, New York, from an ailment of the digestive organs; and was buried at the Spencertown Cemetery there.

== Sources ==
New York State Senate
Preceded by William C. Daley	New York State Senate; 24th District; 1899–1905	Succeeded by Sanford W. Smith
