= Samuel S. Slater =

American politician

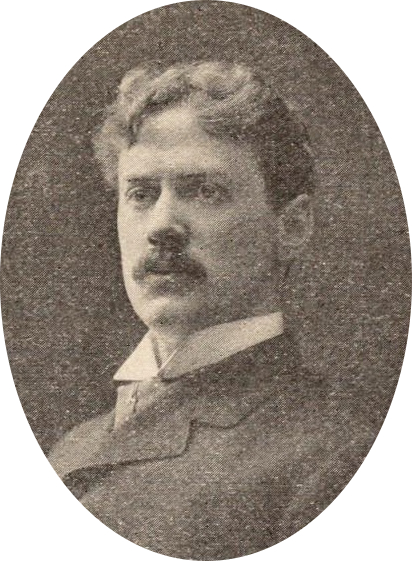
Samuel S. Slater (1900)

Samuel Scott Slater (January 24, 1870 – November 17, 1916) was an American lawyer and politician from New York.

== Life ==
Slater was born on January 24, 1870, New York City, the son of Samuel Maclean Slater and Jane (Scott) Slater. He attended the public schools. After graduation, he worked as a messenger in a law office. In 1890 he entered Cornell University, earning the money for his tuition by being the Cornell correspondent for the Philadelphia Press, the Chicago Tribune, the New York World and the New York Recorder. He graduated B.L. and LL.B. in 1894. He was admitted to the bar, and practiced in New York City. On June 30, 1896, he married Caroline Ingersoll Adsitt (born 1869) who had graduated Ph.B. from Cornell in 1891. They had two daughters.

Slater was a member of the New York State Assembly (New York Co., 31st D.) in 1899. In November 1899, Slater ran for re-election, but was defeated by Democrat Edward C. Stone. However, Stone died in December and Slater was elected on January 23, 1900, to fill the vacancy in the 123rd New York State Legislature. He was a member of the New York State Senate (19th D.) in 1901 and 1902.

In 1903, he published with G. W. Alger A Treatise on the New York Employers' Liability Act.

He died on November 17, 1916, at his home at 259 West 92nd Street in Manhattan.

== Sources ==
New York State Assembly
Preceded by Albert E. Crabtree	New York State Assembly; New York County, 31st District; 1899–1900	Succeeded by Arthur L. Sherer
New York State Senate
Preceded by John Ford	New York State Senate; 19th District; 1901–1902	Succeeded by John W. Russell
