= Nixon Homestead =

Historic house in New York, United States

- U.S. National Register of Historic Places
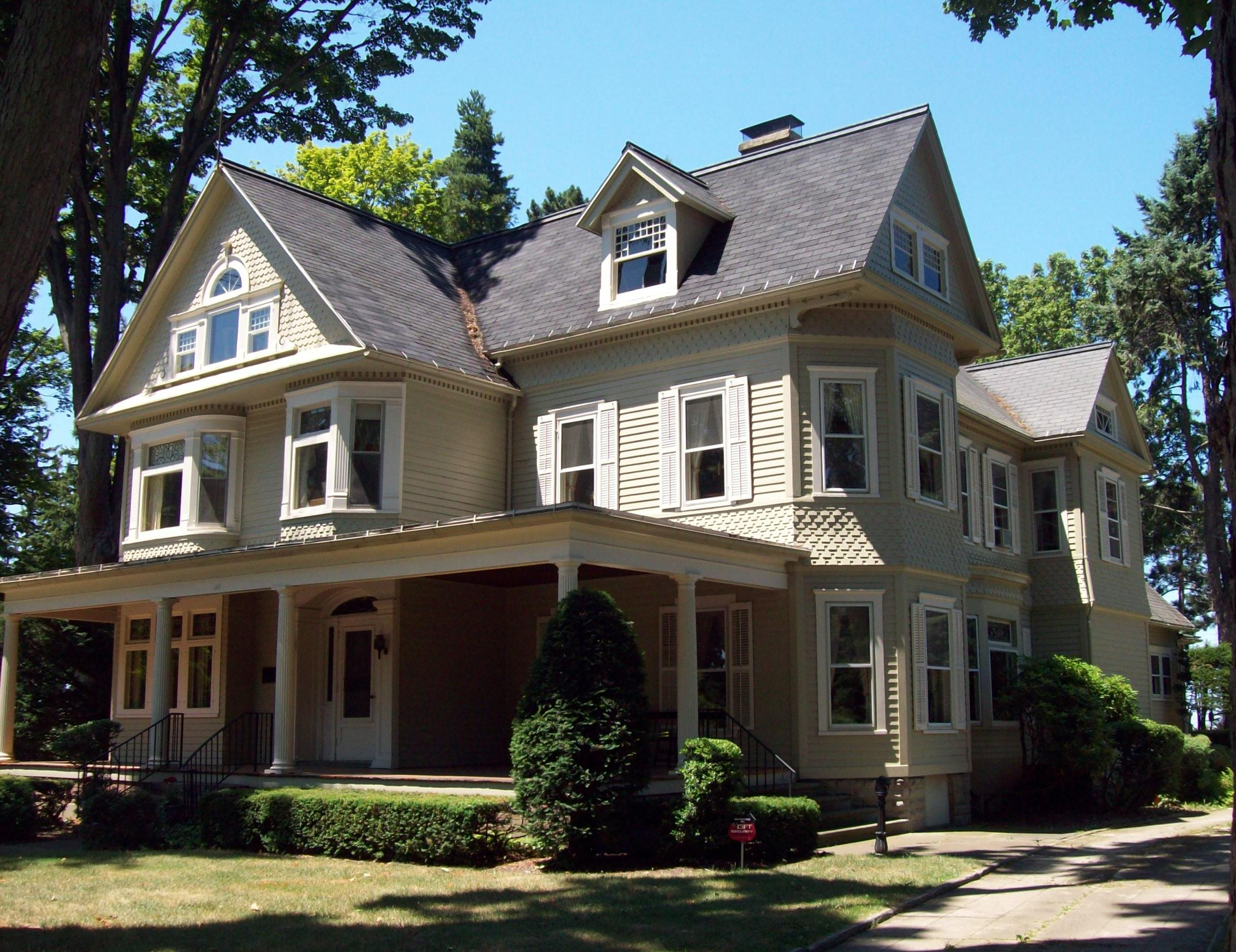
- Nixon Homestead, July 2012

- Location within New York Location within the United States
- Location: 119 W. Main St., Westfield, New York
- Coordinates: 42°19′3″N 79°35′5″W
- Area: 1.8 acres (0.73 ha)
- Built: 1856
- Architectural style: Colonial Revival, Queen Anne
- MPS: Westfield Village MRA
- NRHP reference No.: 83001654
- Added to NRHP: September 26, 1983

The Samuel F. Nixon Homestead', or simply the Nixon Homestead, is a historic home located in the Village of Westfield in Chautauqua County, New York. The original house was built in 1856 and subsequently expanded in about 1890 to its current size and style.

A two-storey wood frame Queen Anne and Colonial Revival style dwelling, it features a prominent Palladian window. The home's namesake was S. Frederick Nixon (1860–1905) who represented Chautauqua County in the New York State Assembly and served as Speaker of the Assembly from 1899 to 1905.

It was listed on the National Register of Historic Places in 1983.
