= Gordon M. Patchin =

American politician

Gordon M. Patchin (December 26, 1847 – December 14, 1934) was an American farmer and politician from New York.

== Life ==
Patchin was born on December 26, 1847, in his family farm in Wayland, New York. His parents were Myron Patchin, one of the founders of Wayland, and Rosillla Parmenter. His grandfather, Walter Patchin, was an American Revolutionary War veteran who was one of the first settlers in the Wayland area.

Patchin attended Dansville Seminary, Naple's Academy, and Rochester Business College. He worked as a farmer and real estate dealer in Wayland. He was a freemason.

In 1891, Patchin was elected to the New York State Assembly as a Republican, representing the Steuben County 1st District. He served in the Assembly in 1892, 1893, 1902, and 1903.

Patchin died at home on December 14, 1934. He was buried in East Wayland Cemetery.

New York State Assembly
Preceded by Grattan H. Brundage	New York State Assembly; Steuben County, 1st District; 1892-1893	Succeeded by Willoughby W. Babcock
Preceded by Hyatt C. Hatch	New York State Assembly; Steuben County, 2nd District; 1902-1903	Succeeded by Jerry E. B. Santee
