= Sanford W. Smith =

American politician

Sanford Willard Smith (August 19, 1869 – January 24, 1929) was an American lawyer and politician from New York.

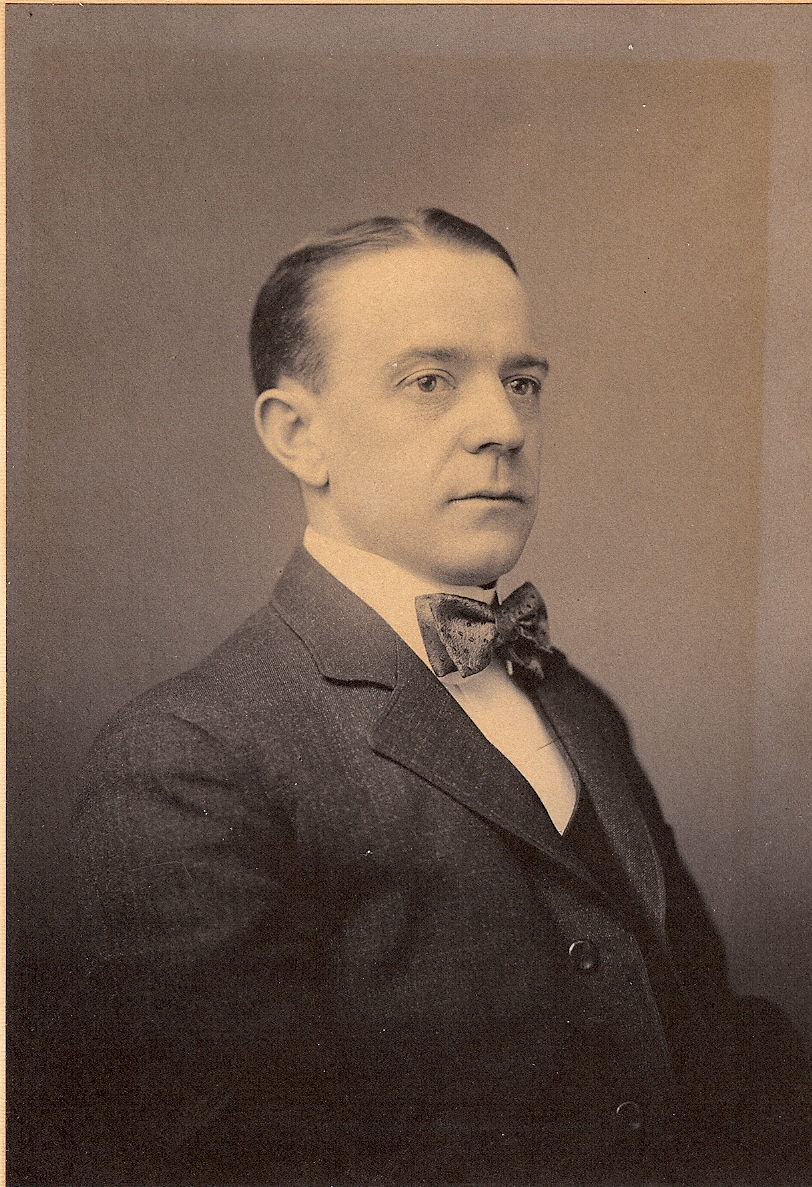
Portrait of Sanford taken for his wedding on July 1, 1896, in Chatham, New York.

== Life ==
Smith was born on August 19, 1869, in Kinderhook, Columbia County, New York, the son of Henry Smith (died 1895) and Rachel (Shaw) Smith. He attended the district schools and Chatham High School. Smith graduated from Cornell Law School in 1889, was admitted to the bar in 1890, and practiced in Chatham. He married Maude P. Harding, and they had three daughters. Smith was Assistant Journal Clerk of the State Assembly in 1897.

Smith was a member of the New York State Assembly (Columbia Co.) in 1901; Judge of Columbia County from 1902 to 1905; and a member of the New York State Senate from 1906 to 1908, sitting in the 129th (24th D.), 130th and 131st New York State Legislatures (both 25th D.).

In March 1918, he was appointed by Gov. Charles S. Whitman as Presiding Judge of the New York Court of Claims and remained on the bench until January 1927.

In February 1928, Smith was appointed by Gov. Al Smith to the New York Supreme Court (3rd D.) to fill the vacancy caused by the resignation of Aaron V. S. Cochrane until the end of the year.

Smith died on January 24, 1929, at his home in Chatham, New York, from a heart attack; and was buried at the Chatham Rural Cemetery.

Sanford W. Smith Hook & Ladder Co., one of the two fire companies that comprise the Chatham Fire Department, is named after him.

== Sources ==
New York State Assembly
Preceded by Martin M. Kittel	New York State Assembly; Columbia County; 1901	Succeeded by Elbert Payne
New York State Senate
Preceded by Henry S. Ambler	New York State Senate; 24th District; 1906	Succeeded by John C. R. Taylor
Preceded by John N. Cordts	New York State Senate; 25th District; 1907–1908	Succeeded by John B. Rose
