= Franklin D. Sherwood =

American politician (1841–1907)

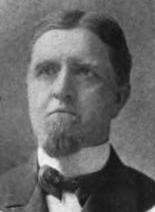
Franklin D. Sherwood (1903)

Franklin D. Sherwood (December 25, 1841 in Wheeler, Steuben County, New York – September 14, 1907 in Hornell, Steuben Co., NY) was an American politician from New York.

== Life ==
He attended the common schools, Lima Academy, and Alfred University. In 1870, he removed to Hornellsville, and engaged in mercantile and manufacturing pursuits.

He was Sheriff of Steuben County from 1877 to 1879.

In November 1891, he was elected to the State Senate, but his Democratic opponent Charles E. Walker contested the election in the courts. Sherwood was at the time of election a member of the Board of Park Commissioners of the City of Hornellsville, and was ultimately declared ineligible by the New York Court of Appeals under Section 3, Article VIII, of the State Constitution. The Board of State Canvassers refused to declare any candidate elected, leaving it to the State Senate to decide how to proceed, and Walker was seated at the beginning of the session of the 115th New York State Legislature by a vote of the Democratic majority of the Senate.

Sherwood was a delegate to the 1892 Republican National Convention and a presidential elector in the 1896 and 1900 presidential elections.

Sherwood was a member of the New York State Senate (41st D.) from 1899 to 1904, sitting in the 122nd, 123rd, 124th, 125th, 126th and 127th New York State Legislatures.

He died on September 14, 1907, in Hornell, New York, and was buried at the Hope Cemetery there.

== Sources ==
- Official New York from Cleveland to Hughes by Charles Elliott Fitch (Hurd Publishing Co., New York and Buffalo, 1911, Vol. IV; pg. 364f)
- NOT ELIGIBLE FOR SENATOR; ATTORNEY GENERAL TABOR'S OPINION AS TO FRANKLIN D. SHERWOOD in NYT on October 23, 1891
- NOT BARRED BY STATUTE; JUDGE DANFORTH SAYS THAT A PARK COMMISSIONER MAY BE A LEGISLATOR in NYT on November 10, 1891
- HILL'S SCHEMES SUCCESSFUL in NYT on December 30, 1891
- EX-SENATOR SHERWOOD DEAD in NYT on September 15, 1907
- Hope Cemetery transcriptions

New York State Senate
| Preceded by John S. Sheppard | New York State Senate; 41st District; 1899–1904 | Succeeded by William J. Tully |
