= Conrad Hasenflug =

American politician (1863–1932)

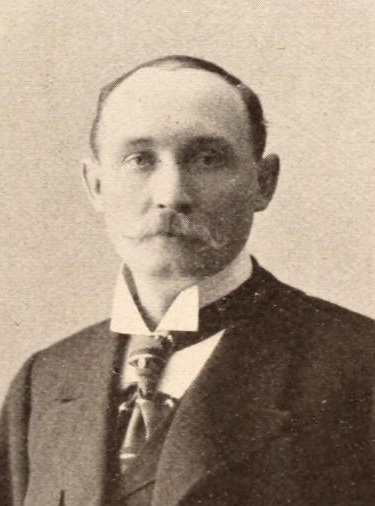
Conrad Hasenflug (1900)

Conrad Hasenflug (February 27, 1863 – November 24, 1932) was an American politician from New York.

== Early life ==
Hasenflug was born on February 27, 1863, in the Free City of Frankfurt. The next year, the family emigrated to the United States, and settled in Williamsburg, Brooklyn.

== Career ==
Hasenflug became a retail, and later wholesale, produce dealer. He was a member of the New York State Assembly (Kings Co., 19th D.) in 1900 and 1901. In November 1901, he ran for Clerk of Kings County, but was defeated. Afterwards he was appointed as Deputy Dock Commissioner of New York City.

He was a member of the New York State Senate (9th D.) from 1905 to 1908, sitting in the 128th, 129th, 130th and 131st New York State Legislatures. In 1909, he removed to Queens where he ran saloons and amusement establishments.

== Personal life ==
Hasenflug died on Thanksgiving Day, November 24, 1932, at his home at 84–37 169th Street in Jamaica, Queens, of pneumonia; and was buried at the Lutheran Cemetery in Glendale, Queens.

== Sources ==
New York State Assembly
Preceded by Frederick Schmid	New York State Assembly; Kings County, 19th District; 1900–1901	Succeeded by John Wolf
New York State Senate
Preceded by Joseph Wagner	New York State Senate; 9th District; 1905–1908	Succeeded by John Kissel
