= James J. McInerney =

American politician (1874–1941)

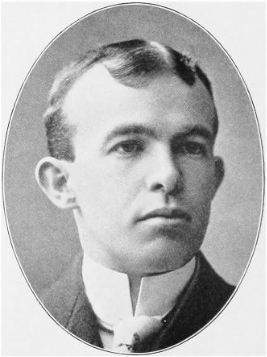

Member of the New York State Assembly
- In office 1899–1903
- Constituency: Kings County, 3rd District

Personal details
- Born: October 29, 1874 Brooklyn, New York, US
- Died: August 6, 1941 (aged 66) Brooklyn, New York, US
- Party: Democratic
- Education: New York Law School
- Occupation: Lawyer, judge, politician

James J. McInerney (October 29, 1874 – August 6, 1941) was an American lawyer, judge, and politician from New York.

== Life ==
McInerney was born on October 29, 1874, in Brooklyn, New York. He attended St. Peter's Academy, graduating from there in 1899. He then went to the Boys' High School for two years, followed by New York Preparatory School.

McInerney studied law in the law office of Minor & Stern. He attended New York Law School, graduating from there in 1896. He was admitted to the bar in 1897. After practicing in Manhattan for four years, he opened a law office in Brooklyn and started a law firm with Philip D. Meagher under the name Meagher & McInerney.

In 1898, McInerney was elected to the New York State Assembly as a Democrat, representing the Kings County 3rd District. He served in the Assembly in 1899, 1900, 1901, 1902, and 1903.

In 1904, McInerney was appointed Second Deputy Commissioner of Charities, in charge of Brooklyn and Queens. In 1908, he was appointed a justice of the New York City Court of Special Sessions in Manhattan. He served on the seat for 30 years, retiring in 1938. In 1940, he moved to Sayville with his family.

McInerney was married to Eva Behr. Their children were Jay, George, John, Peter, Eva, and Mrs. Raymond Jackson.

McInerney died at home on August 6, 1941. He was buried in the family plot in St. Lawrence Cemetery.

New York State Assembly
Preceded by Thomas H. Cullen	New York State Assembly; Kings County, 3rd District; 1899-1903	Succeeded by Thomas P. Reilly
