= S. Frederick Nixon =

American politician

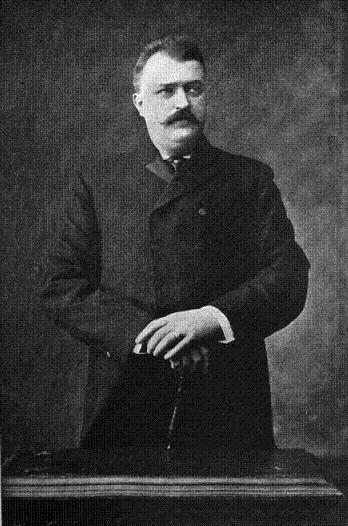
Nixon in 1903

Samuel Frederick Nixon (December 8, 1860 Westfield, Chautauqua County, New York - October 10, 1905 Westfield, Chautauqua County, New York) was an American businessman and politician.

== Life ==
He was educated at Westfield High School and graduated from Hamilton College in 1881.

He had interests in railroad companies, and operated a marble and granite works, a box factory and various other enterprises in and around Westfield.

In 1884, he was elected Trustee of the Village of Westfield. In 1886, he was elected Supervisor of the Town of Westfield. Later he was elected Chairman of the Chautauqua County Board of Supervisors for 14 annual terms.

He was a member of the New York State Assembly (Chautauqua Co., 1st D.) in 1888, 1889, 1890.

He was again a member of the State Assembly in 1894, 1895 (both Chautauqua Co.), 1896, 1897, 1898, 1899, 1900, 1901, 1902, 1903, 1904 and 1905 (all ten Chautauqua Co., 2nd D.); and was Speaker from 1899 to 1905. He was a delegate to the Republican National Convention in 1904.

In the summer of 1905, he travelled to visit the Lewis and Clark Centennial Exposition in Portland, Oregon, but returned already ill. A few weeks later he developed "blood poisoning" and underwent two operations, but died shortly thereafter. His home, the Nixon Homestead, was listed on the National Register of Historic Places in 1983.

== Sources ==
- "SPEAKER NIXON DIES IN WESTFIELD HOME; End Comes Four Hours after Operation" (PDF). The New York Times. October 11, 1905.

New York State Assembly
Preceded by Dana P. Horton	New York State Assembly; Chautauqua County, 1st District; 1888–1890	Succeeded by Walter C. Gifford
Preceded by Egburt E. Woodbury	New York State Assembly; Chautauqua County; 1894–1895	Succeeded by district split
Preceded by new district	New York State Assembly; Chautauqua County, 2nd District; 1896–1905	Succeeded by Henry K. Williams
Political offices
Preceded by James M. E. O'Grady	Speaker of the New York State Assembly; 1899–1905	Succeeded by James Wolcott Wadsworth, Jr.
