= James D. Feeter =

American politician (1840–1903)

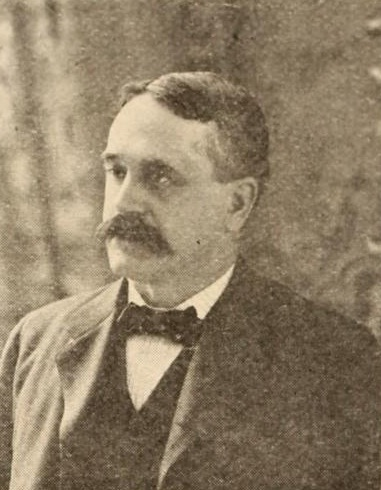
- Feeter in 1900

Member of the New York Senate from the 33rd district
- In office 1899–1902
- Preceded by: Walter L. Brown
- Succeeded by: Walter L. Brown

Personal details
- Born: June 28, 1840 Little Falls, New York, U.S.
- Died: March 20, 1903 (aged 62) Little Falls, New York, U.S.
- Party: Republican
- Spouse: Ella Craig (m. 1881)
- Occupation: Politician; cashier; bank president

James D. Feeter (June 28, 1840 – March 20, 1903) was an American banker and politician from New York.

== Early life ==
James D. Feeter was born on June 28, 1840, in Little Falls, Herkimer County, New York, to Cynthia (née Small) and James Feeter. He studied in public schools in Little Falls.

== Career ==
Feeter engaged in the grocery business with his father. He began to work for the Little Falls National Bank, first as assistant cashier in 1879, then as cashier in 1889, and finally became president of the bank after Seth M. Richmond in 1895. He served as treasurer of the Village of Little Falls. He was also a member of the fire and police commission for a few years. After Little Falls became a city, he was appointed as a member of the board of public works and served in that role until 1898. He was a delegate to the 1876 Republican National Convention. He was one of 12 New York delegates to vote for James G. Blaine.

Feeter was a member of the New York State Senate (33rd district) from 1899 to 1902, sitting in the 122nd, 123rd, 124th and 125th New York State Legislatures. He was chairman of the Internal Affairs of Towns and Counties Committee.

== Personal life ==
Feeter married Ella Craig on March 15, 1881.

Feeter died of heart disease on March 20, 1903, at his home in Little Falls. and was buried at the Church Street Cemetery there.

== Sources ==
New York State Senate
Preceded by Walter L. Brown	New York State Senate; 33rd District; 1899–1902	Succeeded by Walter L. Brown
