= John Hill Morgan =

American lawyer, politician, and art expert

- Born: John Hill Morgan; June 30, 1870; Brooklyn, New York City, New York, U.S.
- Died: July 16, 1945 (aged 75); Farmington, Connecticut, U.S.
- Resting place: Saint Paul's Church Cemetery, Mount Vernon, New York
- Citizenship: American
- Education: Brooklyn Polytechnic Institute; St. Paul's School
- Alma mater: Yale University (BA, LLB)
- Occupations: Lawyer, politician, art historian, curator
- Employer: Yale University
- Known for: Authority on American colonial art; member of the New York State Assembly
- Political party: Republican
- Spouse: Leila Augusta Myers (m. 1903)
- Children: 1

John Hill Morgan (June 30, 1870 – July 16, 1945) was an American lawyer, politician, and art expert.

== Early life and education ==
Morgan was born on June 30, 1870, in Brooklyn, New York, the son of James Lancaster Morgan and Alice M. Hill. He attended Brooklyn Polytechnic Institute and St. Paul's School in Concord, New Hampshire. He graduated from Yale College with a B.A. in 1893, and from Yale Law School with an LL.B. cum laude in 1896.

While in Yale College, he was a member of Psi Upsilon and Wolf's Head and served as business manager of The Yale Record. In Yale Law School, he was a member of Phi Delta Phi and Corby Court, and was an editor of the Yale Law Journal.

== Law and political career ==
Morgan was admitted to the New York bar in 1896. He practiced law in Manhattan for the next four years, at which point he moved his law practice to Brooklyn. In 1904, he joined the law firm Mckeen, Brewster & Morgan, and later formed the firm Rumsey & Morgan. He retired from his law practice in 1936, after which he moved to Farmington, Connecticut. He was also a trustee of the Brooklyn Savings Bank and the Bank of America.

In 1899, Morgan was elected to the New York State Assembly as a Republican, representing the Kings County 1st District. He served in the Assembly in 1900, 1901, 1902, and 1903. In the 1918 United States House of Representatives election, he was the Republican candidate for New York's 7th congressional district. He lost to James P. Maher.

== Art career ==
Morgan was an authority on American colonial art and wrote a number of books and articles on the subject. In 1924, he was elected to the American Antiquarian Society. He was also a member of the Walpole Society and was an honorary curator of the Yale School of Fine Arts, where he held the rank of assistant professor. His collection of early American paintings and portraits were displayed in the Metropolitan Museum of Art and the Brooklyn Museum, and in 1937 he presented a portrait of John C. Calhoun to Calhoun College. He received an honorary M.A. from Yale in 1929, followed by an honorary LL.D. from Washington and Lee University in 1932. He was on the governing committee of the Brooklyn Museum and was a trustee of the Brooklyn Institute of Arts and Sciences and the New York Historical Society.

== Board memberships ==
Morgan was a member of the Society of Colonial Wars, the University Club, the New York State Bar Association, and the Brooklyn Bar Association. He was a trustee of the Brooklyn Public Library and the Children's Aid Society.

== Personal life ==
In 1903, Morgan married Leila Augusta Myers. They had one daughter, Leila. He was a member of the Episcopal Church. Morgan died at home on July 16, 1945. He was buried in Saint Paul's Church Cemetery in Mount Vernon.

New York State Assembly
Preceded by William L. Sandford	New York State Assembly; Kings County, 1st District; 1900-1903	Succeeded by Thomas O'Neill (New York politician)
