= Perez M. Stewart =

American politician

Perez Mason Stewart (August 2, 1858 – June 15, 1924) was an American businessman, inventor and politician from New York.

== Life ==
He was born on August 2, 1858, in Boston, Massachusetts. The family moved to New York City in 1860, and later to Hoboken, New Jersey. He went to live in New York City in 1875. He graduated from Columbia College in 1880. Afterwards he engaged in the construction of houses and apartment buildings.

He also entered politics as an Independent Democrat. In 1896, he supported the Gold Democrats. In November 1897, he ran in the 19th District of New York County on the Citizens Union ticket for the New York State Assembly. His opponents were the incumbent Republican Robert Mazet and Tammany Hall nominee Solomon C. Weill. Stewart received the largest number of votes, but the election inspectors made a false vote count and certified the election of Weill who was seated at the beginning of the session of the 121st New York State Legislature in January 1898. Stewart contested the election in the courts Weill died on April 28, before the case was decided. The case eventually reached the New York Court of Appeals, which ruled in favor of Stewart who was seated in the State Assembly at the beginning of the special session on July 11. He did not run for re-election in November 1898, and Mazet was again elected to the seat. At the next election, in November 1899, Stewart ran again on the Citizens Union ticket and accepted the endorsement of Tammany Hall. He defeated Mazet, and was again a member of the State Assembly in 1900. In that year, he supported William Jennings Bryan for president.

Stewart was Manhattan Superintendent of Buildings from January 1, 1902, to April 29, 1903, when he was dismissed by Borough President Jacob A. Cantor.

He died on June 15, 1924, in Pasadena, California.

== Sources ==
New York State Assembly
| Preceded by Solomon C. Weill | New York State Assembly; New York County, 19th District; 1898 | Succeeded by Robert Mazet |
| Preceded by Robert Mazet | New York State Assembly; New York County, 19th District; 1900 | Succeeded by Julius H. Seymour |
