= Joseph Wagner (New York politician) =

American politician

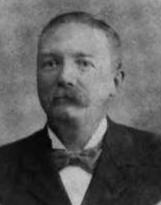
Joseph Wagner (1903)

Joseph Wagner (1853 - January 29, 1932) was an American politician from New York, though he was born in Alsace, France.

== Life ==
Wagner's family emigrated to the United States in 1856, and settled in Newark, New Jersey. In 1868, he removed to Brooklyn and became a carpenter. In 1875, he opened his own business as a carpenter, builder and contractor. Later he became a general contractor and executed public works of large proportions in Brooklyn.

He was Messenger to the Board of Aldermen of Brooklyn from 1881 to 1883; and Superintendent of the Truant Home from 1883 to 1884.

Wagner was a member of the New York State Senate (9th D.) from 1899 to 1904, sitting in the 122nd, 123rd, 124th, 125th, 126th and 127th New York State Legislatures.

In 1904, Wagner was elected to a seat on the Supreme Court of New York, which is the general trial court of the state. Wagner's wife, Barbara, died in 1905.

Wagner died at St. Catherine's Hospital following a brief illness, at the age of 78.

== Sources ==
- Official New York from Cleveland to Hughes by Charles Elliott Fitch (Hurd Publishing Co., New York and Buffalo, 1911, Vol. IV; pg. 364f)
- FOR SENATORS FROM KINGS in NYT on October 10, 1900
- New York Red Book by Edgar L. Murlin (1903; pg. 99f)

New York State Senate
Preceded by Julius L. Wieman	New York State Senate; 9th District; 1899–1904	Succeeded by Conrad Hasenflug
