= James T. Rogers =

American politician (1864–1929)

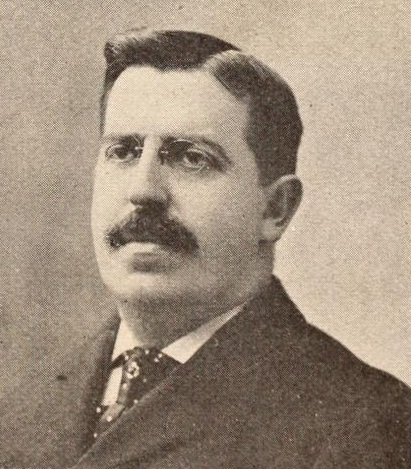
- Rogers in 1900

Member of the New York State Assembly from the Broome County district
- In office 1907–1907
- Preceded by: new district
- Succeeded by: Harry C. Perkins

Member of the New York State Assembly from the Broome County, 1st district
- In office 1899–1906
- Preceded by: Charles E. Fuller
- Succeeded by: district abolished

Personal details
- Born: James Tracy Rogers; April 18, 1864 Owego, New York, U.S.
- Died: August 30, 1929 (aged 65) Binghamton, New York, U.S.
- Resting place: Floral Park Cemetery; Johnson City, New York, U.S.
- Party: Republican
- Spouse(s): Emily Lodge Grummond (m. 1912; died 1917) Ethel Coffin Drew (m. 1920)
- Children: 1
- Education: Cornell Law School (LLB)
- Occupation: Politician; lawyer

James Tracy Rogers (April 18, 1864 – August 30, 1929) was an American lawyer and politician from New York.

== Life ==
He was born on April 18, 1864, in Owego, Tioga County, New York. He attended Owego Free Academy. He was Assistant Postmaster of Owego for six years. Then he studied law with County Judge Howard J. Mead, and worked as Clerk of the Surrogate's Court of Owego County and Clerk of the Village of Owego. He enrolled at Cornell Law School, was admitted to the bar in September 1892, graduated LL.B. from Cornell in 1893, and began the practice of law in Syracuse. In 1894, he moved to Binghamton and practiced law there.

Rogers was a member of the New York State Assembly in 1899, 1900, 1901, 1902, 1903, 1904, 1905, 1906 and 1907. He was Chairman of the Committee on Excise in 1900; Chairman of the Committee on Electricity, Gas and Water Supply in 1901; Chairman of the Committee on the Judiciary in 1902; Majority Leader and Chairman of the Committee on Ways and Means from 1903 to 1905; and Chairman of the Committee on Insurance in 1906 and 1907.

On February 29, 1912, he married Emily (Lodge) Grummond (died 1917).

On October 14, 1920, he married Ethel Coffin Drew, and they had one son.

He died in Binghamton on August 30, 1929; and was buried at the Floral Park Cemetery in Johnson City.

== Sources ==
New York State Assembly
Preceded by Charles E. Fuller	New York State Assembly; Broome County, 1st District; 1899–1906	Succeeded by district abolished
Preceded by new district	New York State Assembly; Broome County; 1907	Succeeded by Harry C. Perkins
Political offices
Preceded by Jotham P. Allds	Majority Leader of the New York State Assembly; 1903–1905	Succeeded by Sherman Moreland
