= Charles J. Gardner =

American politician

Charles J. Gardner (May 12, 1843 – May 7, 1901) was an American politician from New York.

== Life ==
Gardner was born on May 12, 1843, in Attica, New York, and was the son of farmer Patrick Gardner and Jennette E. Munger.

Gardner attended local district schools and spent two years as a student in the Genesee and Wyoming Seminary. In August 1862, during the American Civil War, he enlisted in Company C of the 130th New York Infantry Regiment. The regiment later became the 19th New York Cavalry Regiment and then the 1st New York Dragoons Regiment. Initially a corporal of the company, he was later promoted to sergeant. In the fall of 1864, during the Valley campaigns of 1864, he lost his right leg, which was amputated at the Camden Street Hospital in Baltimore. Gangrene developed after the amputation, and he needed to be operated on a second time. He was discharged from the army in April 1865. After returning to Attica, he was appointed a postal clerk on the Erie Railway, a position he held for the next three years.

While still in the hospital, Gardner was elected town collector of Attica. He was also appointed to take the 1865 census in Attica. In 1866, he was appointed assistant assessor of internal revenue for five towns. In 1870, he was appointed postal clerk between Attica and Hornellsville. He held this position until 1874, when he was elected county clerk of Wyoming County. After his election, he moved to Warsaw and held the office for two terms. He was then appointed Postmaster at Warsaw by President Arthur. He resigned from the office in 1887, when he was elected Sheriff of Wyoming County.

Gardner was elected Clerk of the Wyoming County Board of Supervisors in 1879 and served in that office for fourteen years. In 1899, he was elected to the New York State Assembly as a Republican, representing Wyoming County. He served in the Assembly in 1900 and 1901.

Gardner was a member of the Grand Army of the Republic. In 1865, he married Annette R. Terry. Their children were Martha, William P., and George W.

== Death ==
Gardner died at home from uremic poisoning on May 7, 1901. He was buried in Warsaw Cemetery.

New York State Assembly
Preceded by Daniel P. Whipple	New York State Assembly; Wyoming County; 1900–1901	Succeeded by Henry J. McNair
