= Alpheus Potts =

American lawyer, judge and politician

Alpheus Potts (January 6, 1838 – February 22, 1911) was an American lawyer, judge, and politician from New York.

== Life ==
Potts was born on January 6, 1838, in Bethel, New York. He attended the Liberty Normal Institute. His parents were Samuel Potts and Louisa DuBron.

Originally engaged in agriculture, he later became a practicing lawyer in Jeffersonville. In 1871, he was elected District Attorney. He also served as town supervisor for Callicoon.

In 1879, Potts was elected to the New York State Assembly as a Republican, representing Sullivan County. He served in the Assembly in 1880. In the 1896 presidential election, he was a presidential elector for William McKinley and Garret Hobart.

In 1881, New York Governor Alonzo B. Cornell appointed Potts County Judge of Sullivan County after his predecessor, William L. Thornton, was declared ineligible.

Potts died at home on February 22, 1911. His son Theron, prominent in education circles, was in Puerto Rico at the time and the funeral was delayed until he could return. After arriving in Jeffersonville, he got sick and died during his father's funeral. Potts was buried in the Methodist Episcopal cemetery.

New York State Assembly
Preceded by Roderick Morison (New York)	New York State Assembly; Sullivan County; 1880	Succeeded by Edward H. Pinney
