= Fred E. Allen =

American merchant and politician

Fred E. Allen (March 26, 1855 – August 21, 1935) was an American merchant and politician from New York.

== Life ==
Allen was born on March 26, 1855, in Lisle, New York, the son of James F. Allen and a descendant of Ethan Allen. He attended Whitney's Point High School.

Allen lived in Whitney's Point and commenced his merchant business in 1883. He initially clerked for J. P. Griffin and at one point had a partnership with Jesse Babcock. He began his own business with a dry goods and grocery stock in the C. H. Parsons store. He developed a successful mercantile business with one of the largest stocks in town. His brother Herbert was his business partner. He retired in 1930.

Allen served as town clerk for several years, village trustee, a board of education member for fifteen years, and president of the school board for eight years. A Republican, he was a member of the Republican County Committee. In 1901, he was elected to the New York State Assembly as a Republican, representing the Broome County 2nd District. He served in the Assembly in 1902, 1903, 1904, 1905, and 1906. He also served as secretary of the Broome County Agricultural Society for nine years and as postmaster for eight years.

Allen was a trustee of the local Baptist Church. He was a member of the Freemasons. In 1875, he married Atala Babcock. Atala died in 1910. In 1911, he married Delia Stafford Robinson.

Allen died at home on August 21, 1935, a little over a month after his wife Delia's death. He was buried in Riverside Cemetery.

New York State Assembly
Preceded by John H. Swift	New York State Assembly; Broome County, 2nd District; 1902–1906	Succeeded by District Abolished
