= John J. Sammon =

American politician

John J. Sammon (1876–?) was an American lawyer and politician.

Sammon was born in 1876 in New York City. He graduated from the City College of New York, and worked as a grocer while pursuing legal studies. He passed the bar in 1902 and began his legal practice. With the support of Tammany Hall, Sammon won the Democratic Party nomination for Manhattan's 11th New York State Assembly district in 1904, and defeated Republican candidate Joseph H. Simpson in 1904. During his service on the 128th New York State Legislature, Sammon was appointed to the assembly committees on revision and charitable and religious societies. He won reelection against Matthew G. W. White. As the 128th New York State Legislature met, Sammon was a member of the committees on state prisons and codes. Sammon's 1920 candidacy for a seat on the New York Supreme Court was backed by the Farmer–Labor Party. However, the New York City Board of Elections found that Sammon's petition for candidacy did not contain enough valid signatures, leading to his disqualification. Fellow Supreme Court candidate J. Fairfax McLaughlin and Manhattan municipal court candidate Robert Ferrarl were also disqualified.
