= James A. Rierdon =

American politician (1854–1911)

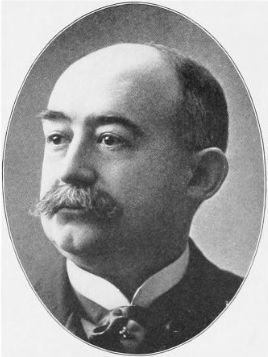

Member of the New York State Assembly
- In office 1899–1901
- Constituency: New York County 2nd District

Personal details
- Born: February 27, 1854 New York, New York, US
- Died: July 22, 1911 (aged 57) New York, New York, US
- Resting place: Calvary Cemetery
- Party: Democratic
- Occupation: Hat manufacturer, politician

James A. Rierdon (February 27, 1854 – July 22, 1911) was an American politician from New York City.

== Life ==
Rierdon was born on February 27, 1854, in New York City, New York, the son of Dennis and Anna Rierdon.

Rierdon attended public and parochial schools and graduated from St. Teresa Academy, after which he worked as a silk hat manufacturer. He became an active member of Tammany Hall in the 1890s. In 1898, he was elected to the New York State Assembly as a Democrat, representing the New York County 2nd District. He served in the Assembly in 1899, 1900, and 1901. In 1904, Mayor George B. McClellan Jr. appointed him chief clerk in his office. He also served as chief clerk in the office of William Jay Gaynor as well as bond and warrant clerk.

Rierdon was Grand Regent of the Royal Arcanum of the State of New York, commander of the Knights of St. John and Malta, and a member of the American Legion of Honor, the Catholic Benevolent Legion, the Knights of Columbus, the Royal Arcanum Wheelman, the Ivy Club, the Democratic Club, and the P. Divver Association.

Rierdon died at St. Vincent's Hospital from a long illness on July 22, 1911. His funeral was held at St. Joseph's Church. He was buried at Calvary Cemetery.

New York State Assembly
Preceded by James W. Oliver	New York State Assembly; New York County, 2nd District; 1899–1901	Succeeded by Joseph P. Bourke
