= Frederick W. Griffith =

American politician

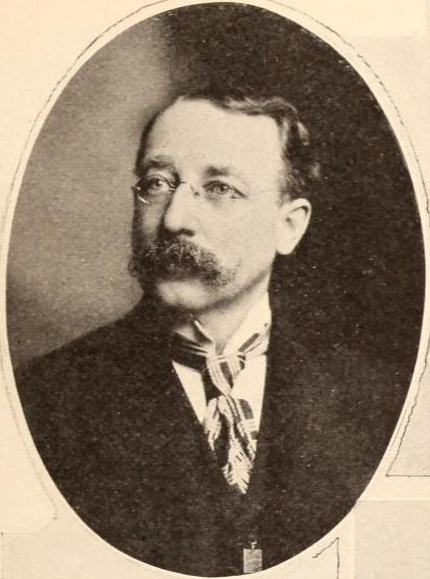
Frederick W. Griffith (1900)

Frederick Winter Griffith (December 17, 1858 – July 11, 1928) was an American businessman and politician from New York.

== Life ==
He was born on December 17, 1858, in Phelps, Ontario County, New York, the son of John Watson Griffith (1830–1891) and Charlotte Elizabeth (Malette) Griffith (1837–1894). He graduated from Hamilton College in 1886. He married Mary Adams (1865–1917), and they had two sons, one of them being State Senator Henry W. Griffith (1897–1956).

Griffith was a member of the New York State Assembly (Wayne Co.) in 1900, 1901 and 1902. He was a presidential elector in the 1904 presidential election.

He was a member of the New York State Senate from 1910 to 1912, sitting in the 133rd, 134th and 135th New York State Legislatures.

He was a presidential elector in 1916, voting for the Republican candidates Charles Evans Hughes and Charles W. Fairbanks.

On August 3, 1918, he married Martha (Riggs) Truax. He was President of the Garlock Packing Company in Palmyra. The company manufactured packing and sealing products; and was taken over by Colt Industries in 1975.

He died suddenly on July 11, 1928, in Pasadena, California; and was buried at the Palmyra Cemetery in Palmyra, New York.

== Sources ==
New York State Assembly
Preceded by Marvin I. Greenwood	New York State Assembly; Wayne County; 1900–1902	Succeeded by Addison P. Smith
New York State Senate
Preceded by John Raines	New York State Senate; 42nd District; 1910–1912	Succeeded by Thomas B. Wilson
