= George A. Robinson =

American politician

George A. Robinson (January 5, 1851 – February 22, 1908) was a Canadian-American physician and politician.

== Life ==
Robinson was born on January 5, 1851, in Newmarket, the Province of Canada, the son of Robert Robinson and Maria Wilson. His father was a contractor and builder, originally from England. His maternal grandfather, Richard Titus Wilson, was a prominent early settler in Canada.

Robinson attended the Upper Canada College in Toronto. He then spent the next three years working in a drug store in Barrie under Dr. S. M. Wells. Poor health led him to move to London, England, where he further studied medicine under Sir William Fergusson. He then finished his medical studies in the University of Iowa medical school, graduating from there in 1881. He returned to Barrie and formed a practice with his former boss, Wells, but this health couldn't handle the Canadian climate, so he moved to America and settled in Sayville, New York, where he opened a medical office. He spent the next two years assisted by Thomas H. Tracey, after which he worked alone. He later was assisted by a Dr. Merritt for three years, and again practiced alone. His clients extended beyond his village, and included summer visitors from New York City and Brooklyn. He was also a founder and foreman of the Sayville Hose Company No. 1.

In 1900, Robinson was elected to the New York State Assembly as a Republican, representing the Suffolk County 2nd District. He served in the Assembly in 1901 and 1902.

Robinson attended the Episcopal Church. He was a member of the Freemasons, Foresters, and the Royal Arcanum. In 1881, he married Amelia A. Foster. Their children were Maude, Amy M., William B., and George Albert.

In 1905, Robinson suffered a paralytic stroke that rendered him invalid for the rest of his life. To avoid the cold weather, he spent the next three winters in Florida. He died from a cerebral hemorrhage in St. Augustine, Florida on February 22, 1908. He was buried in Saint Anns Cemetery in Sayville.

New York State Assembly
Preceded by Regis Henri Post	New York State Assembly; Suffolk County, 2nd District; 1901–1902	Succeeded by Orlando Hubbs
