= John H. Swift =

Irish-American manufacturer and politician

John H. Swift (August 29, 1840 – December 14, 1911) was an Irish-American manufacturer and politician from New York.

== Life ==
Swift was born on August 29, 1840, in Ireland, the son of Peter Swift and Katharine Monahan. He immigrated to America in 1845.

Swift initially lived in Poquonock, Connecticut, and attended public schools there. While serving as an apprentice to a carriage manufacturer, he enlisted in Company A, 12th Connecticut Volunteers. He served with them for three years during the American Civil War, participating in several major battles under Generals Benjamin Butler, Nathaniel P. Banks, and Philip Sheridan. Following his discharge, he learned the blacksmith trade and began working as a skilled mechanic for a large forging company in Southington, Connecticut. In 1883, he formed a manufacturing company called the Union Carriage and Forging Company in Union, New York, with fellow factory workmen with Le Roy S. White and George D. Lincoln. In 1899, they incorporated the Union Forging Company, with Swift as its vice-president.

Swift was a Republican all his life, casting his first presidential vote for Abraham Lincoln on a Virginia battlefield. He served as trustee and president of the village of Union for four years. In 1899, he was elected to the New York State Assembly as a Republican, representing the Broome County 2nd District. He served in the Assembly in 1900 and 1901.

Swift was an active member of the Grand Army of the Republic. In 1868, he married Norah Carroll of Winsted, Connecticut. Their children were James C., Ellen A., Lillian C., and John P.

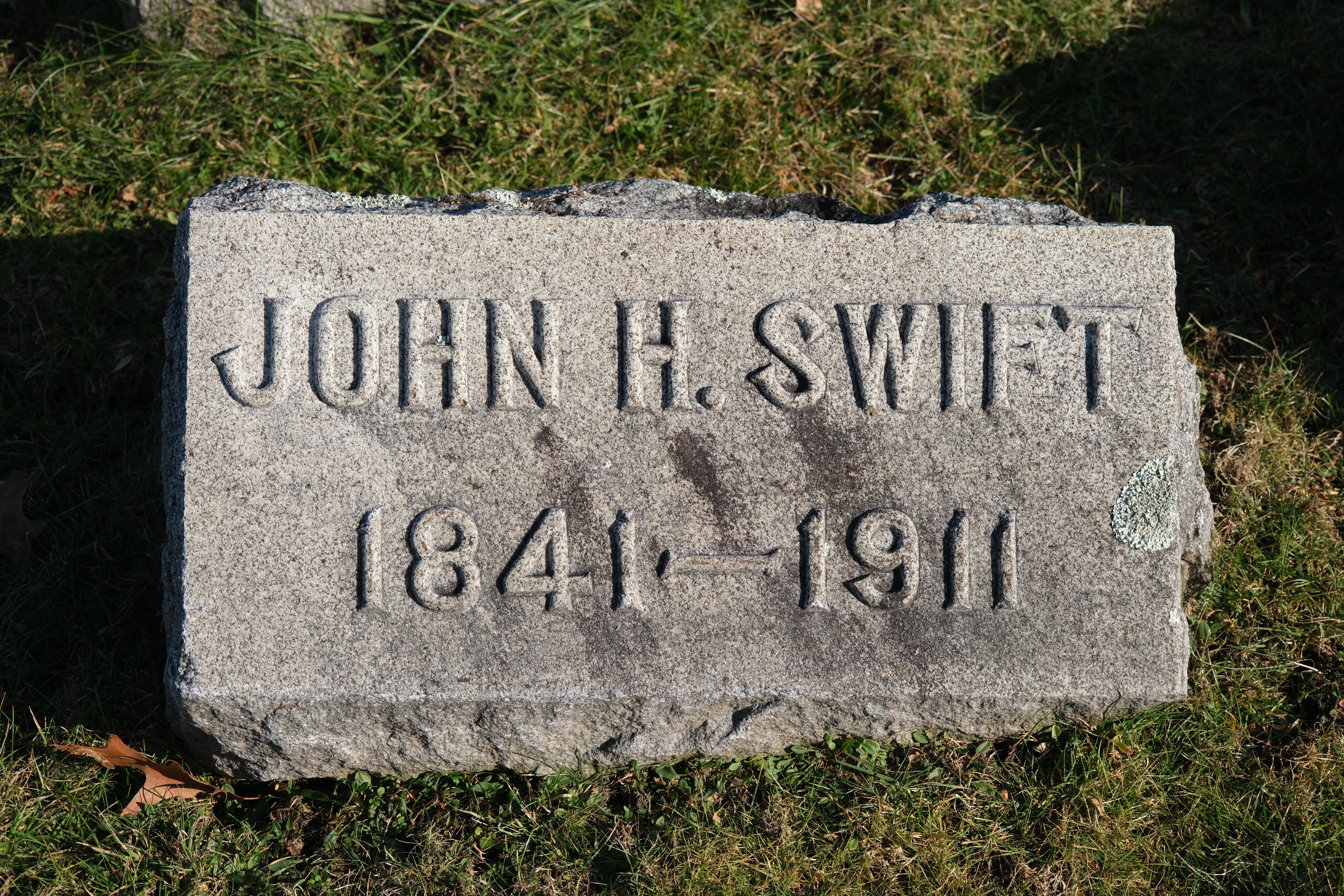
Grave of Swift in St. Patricks Cemetery

Swift died at home on December 14, 1911. He was buried in St. Patrick's Cemetery.

New York State Assembly
Preceded by Edgar L. Vincent	New York State Assembly; Broome County, 2nd District; 1900–1901	Succeeded by Fred E. Allen
