= James K. Apgar =

American politician (1862–1940)

James Kellogg Apgar (November 8, 1862 – September 21, 1940) was an American politician from New York.

== Life ==
Apgar was born on November 8, 1862, in Peekskill, New York, the son of Joseph A. Apgar, a close friend of William H. Robertson and James W. Husted, and Eleanor Herbert.

From 1880 to 1884, Apgar worked as a clerk on the steamboat Sarah A. Brown, which travelled between Peekskill and New York City. In 1884, Husted made him a committee clerk in the New York State Assembly and his own personal clerk. In 1886, 1887, and 1890, he was speaker's clerk for Husted. In 1888 and 1889, he was speaker's clerk for Fremont Cole. In 1891, Husted made him his private secretary. In 1892 and 1893, when Democrats controlled the Assembly, he worked in New York Stove Work, a company Husted was president of. From 1894 to 1896, he worked as the private secretary of Lieutenant Governor Charles T. Saxton. In 1896, he was the private secretary of congressman William L. Ward.

In 1898, Apgar was elected to the New York State Assembly as a Republican, representing the Westchester County 3rd District. He served in the Assembly in 1899, 1900, 1901, 1902, 1903, 1904, 1905, 1906, and 1907. He was an alternate delegate to the 1900 Republican National Convention.

Apgar was appointed a member of the condemnation commission for acquiring land for the Hill View Reservoir. In 1910, he was accused, with fellow commission members George N. Rigby and Bernard F. Martin, of deliberately delaying proceedings and costing New York City at least $10,000. New York City Corporation Counsel Watson brought them to court to remove them from the commission Justice Arthur S. Tompkins didn't remove them from the commission, but he did censure them severely for the delays, including holding 65 hearings for a single land parcel.

In 1917, Apgar was elected County Register. He was re-elected in 1920. He served several terms on the board of trustees for Peeksill, and in 1925 he was elected village president. He was also a member of the board of park commissioners.

Apgar's three daughters were Eleanor, Marion, and Mrs. E. Gosman Halsey, Jr. He was a freemason and a member of the Elks, the Lincoln Society, the Hollow Brook Country Club, and the Cortlandt Hook and Ladder Company.

Apgar died at home on September 21, 1940. He was buried in Hillside Cemetery in Cortlandt Manor.

New York State Assembly
Preceded by John Gibney (New York)	New York State Assembly; Westchester County, 3rd District; 1899-1907	Succeeded by Isaac H. Smith
