= William L. Thornton =

American politician from New York State (1844–1915)

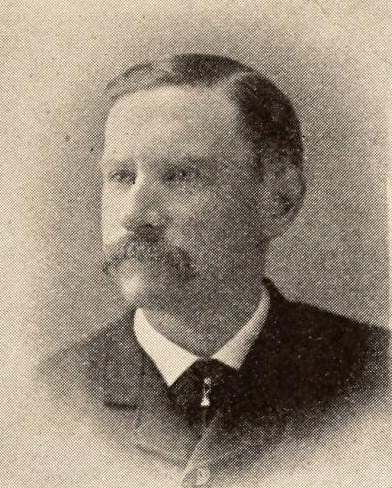
- Portrait of Thornton, c. 1900

Member of the New York State Senate from the 26th district
- In office January 1, 1899 – December 31, 1902
- Preceded by: John Grant
- Succeeded by: Jotham P. Allds

Personal details
- Born: November 28, 1844 Brooklyn, New York, U.S.
- Died: December 29, 1915 (aged 71) Monticello, New York, U.S.
- Party: Republican

William L. Thornton (November 28, 1844 – December 29, 1915) was an American lawyer and politician from New York.

== Life ==
He was born on November 28, 1844, in Brooklyn. The family removed to Monticello, Sullivan County, New York when William was still a child. He attended Monticello Academy. Then he studied law with Archibald C. Niven, was admitted to the bar in 1865, and practiced law in Monticello.

In November 1878, he was elected on the Greenback ticket as Judge of Sullivan County, telling the voters that he would accept only $1,200 as annual salary, the salary for the county judge at that time being fixed at $2,500. He remained in office in 1879 and 1880 but was removed from office on January 5, 1881, by a decision of the New York Supreme Court. His defeated Democratic opponent Timothy Bush claimed that the offer to serve for a reduced salary was a bribe to the people, and Thornton should thus be declared ineligible under the anti-bribery law. This view was accepted by Supreme Court Justice Osborne, who declared the office vacant. Alpheus Potts was appointed to the office, to fill the vacancy. In November 1881, Thornton was re-elected as County Judge and served two terms until the end of 1893.

Thornton was a member of the New York State Senate (26th D.) from 1899 to 1902, sitting in the 122nd, 123rd, 124th and 125th New York State Legislatures.

Thornton was again County Judge from 1911 until the end of 1914, when he reached the constitutional age limit.

He died on December 29, 1915, in front of his home in Monticello, New York, from "heart disease" or "apoplexy"; and was buried at the Rock Ridge Cemetery there.

== Sources ==
New York State Senate
Preceded by John Grant	New York State Senate; 26th District; 1899–1902	Succeeded by Jotham P. Allds
