= Timothy E. Ellsworth =

American politician (1836–1904)

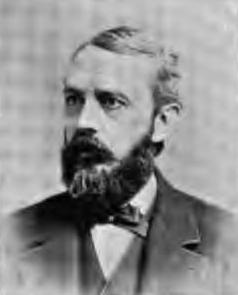
Ellsworth c. 1897

Timothy Edwards Ellsworth (September 21, 1836 – February 10, 1904) was an American lawyer and politician from New York. He was President pro tempore of the New York State Senate from 1896 to 1902.

== Biography ==
Ellsworth was born in East Windsor, Connecticut, on September 21, 1836.

He graduated from University of Rochester in 1857. While there, he was a member of the Fraternity of Delta Psi (St. Anthony Hall). He was admitted to the bar in 1858, and became a clerk in the law office of Gardner & Lamont in Lockport.

In August 1861, he raised a company of cavalry, which became part of the 7th Regiment of Volunteer Cavalry and became its captain. In March 1862, he joined the staff of General James S. Wadsworth, where he remained until the general's death in May 1864. He finished the American Civil War as a colonel, and returned to Lockport, where he formed a partnership with George D. Lamont until the latter was appointed to the New York Supreme Court.

From 1870 to 1878, he was Collector of Customs at the Lockport Suspension Bridge.

He was a member of the New York State Senate (30th D.) from 1882 to 1885, sitting in the 105th, 106th, 107th and 108th New York State Legislatures.

He was again a member of the State Senate (45th D.) from 1896 to 1902, sitting in the 119th, 120th, 121st, 122nd, 123rd, 124th and 125th New York State Legislatures; and was President pro tempore. In 1897, he introduced the much-debated "Press Gag" bill in the State Senate, which did not pass.

Ellsworth died in Lockport, New York on February 10, 1904.

== Sources ==
- Short bio, published when he first ran for the State Senate in the 30th District, in NYT on October 30, 1881
- Obit in NYT on February 11, 1904

New York State Senate
Preceded by James H. Loomis	New York State Senate; 30th District; 1882–1885	Succeeded by Edward C. Walker
Preceded by new district	New York State Senate; 45th District; 1896–1902	Succeeded by Irving L'Hommedieu
Political offices
Preceded by Edmund O'Connor	President pro tempore of the New York State Senate; 1896 - 1902	Succeeded by John Raines
