= John H. Leggett =

American politician (1867–1952)

John H. Leggett

John H. Leggett (December 2, 1868 – August 3, 1938) was an American politician who served in the New York State Assembly for five terms from 1901 to 1905, representing Niagara County's second district.

Leggett was born on December 2, 1868, in Lewiston, New York. He rejected an appointment to the United States Military Academy in West Point to instead study law. He became Niagara County attorney and worked in the county's district attorney's office.

On August 30, 1900, he was nominated at the county Republican convention to replace Jay S. Rowe in the New York State Assembly. He won election that November. He earned reelection in November 1901, and each election through 1904. He did not run for reelection in 1905.

In 1922, Leggett unsuccessfully ran against S. Wallace Dempsey in the Republican primary for United States House of Representatives to represent New York's 40th congressional district.

He died at his home in Niagara Falls on August 3, 1938.

New York State Assembly
Preceded by Jay S. Rowe	New York State Assembly; Niagara County, Second District; 1901-1905	Succeeded by W. Levell Draper
