= Ernest G. Treat =

American politician (1867–1952)

Ernest G. Treat

Ernest G. Treat (February 7, 1867 – January 23, 1952) was an American politician who served in the New York State Assembly for four terms from 1900 to 1903, representing Cayuga County's first district.

Treat was born on February 7, 1867 in South Butler, New York. After graduating from Madison College, he worked in banking and farming.

In 1899, Treat, a Republican a won election to the state Assembly after facing no Democratic opposition. He served four, one-year terms through 1903.

After leaving the Assembly, Treat served as the village of Weedsport's village president from 1907 to 1911, 1916 to 1918, and 1924 to 1929 and mayor from 1929 to 1930, when he resigned.

He died in Weedsport on January 23, 1952.

New York State Assembly
Preceded by Elias Q. Dutton	New York State Assembly; Cayuga County, First District; 1900-1903	Succeeded by Judson W. Hapeman
