= Thomas H. Cullen =

American politician

Thomas Henry Cullen
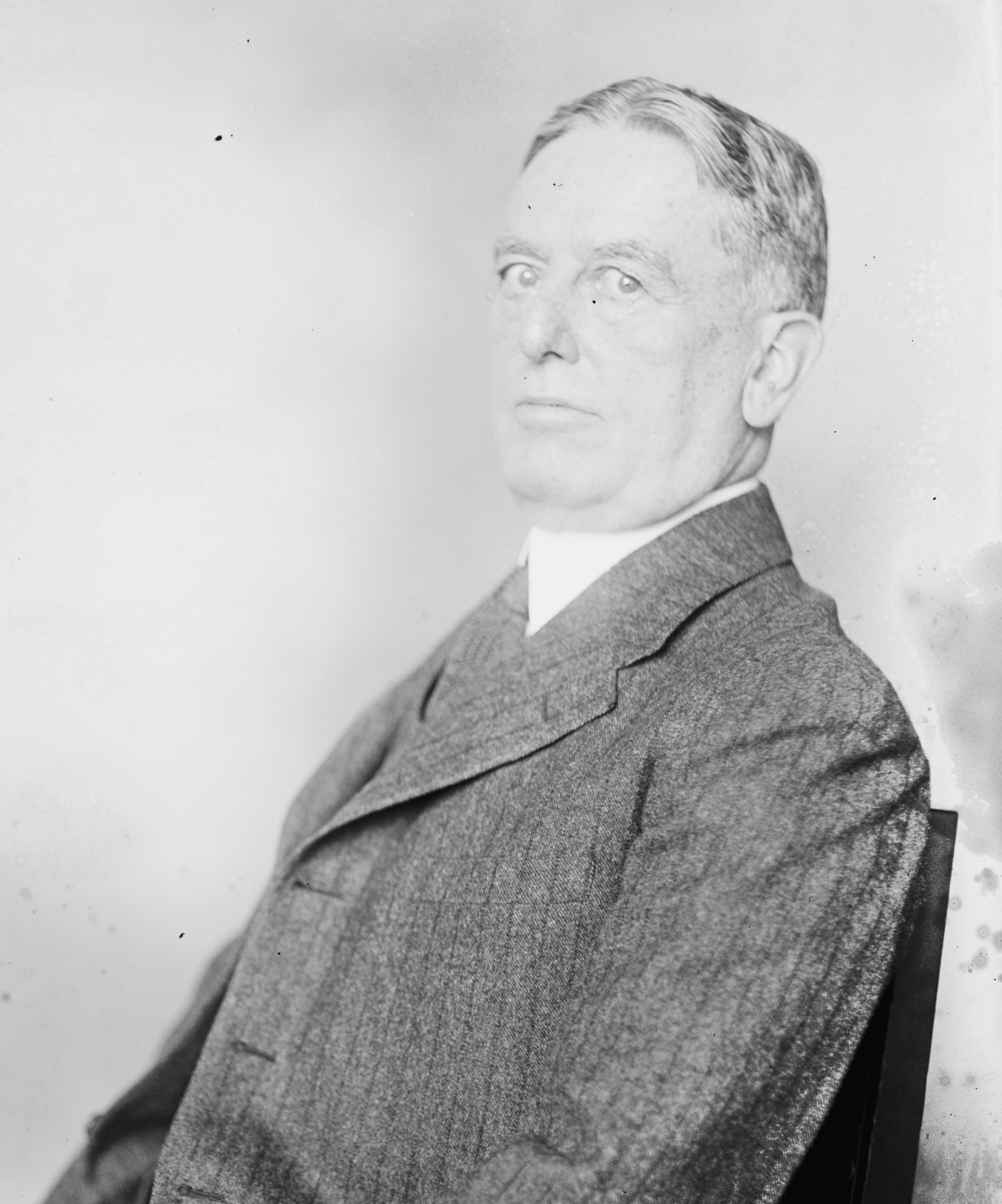

Member of the U.S. House of Representatives from New York's 4th district
- In office March 4, 1919 – March 1, 1944
- Preceded by: Harry H. Dale
- Succeeded by: John J. Rooney

Member of the New York Senate from the 3rd district
- In office January 1, 1899 – December 31, 1918
- Preceded by: Frank Gallagher
- Succeeded by: Peter J. McGarry

Member of the New York State Assembly from the Kings County, 3rd district
- In office January 1, 1896 – December 31, 1898
- Preceded by: John F. Houghton
- Succeeded by: James J. McInerney

Personal details
- Born: March 29, 1868 Brooklyn, New York, US
- Died: March 1, 1944 (aged 75) Washington, D.C., US
- Resting place: Holy Cross Cemetery; 40.64690°N 73.93830°W
- Party: Democratic Party
- Education: St. Francis College

Thomas Henry Cullen (March 29, 1868 – March 1, 1944) was an American businessman and politician from New York who served thirteen terms in the U.S. House of Representatives from 1919 to 1944.

== Biography ==
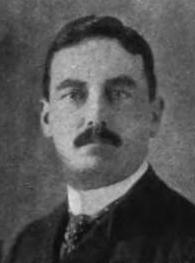
Thomas H. Cullen (1903)

Born in Brooklyn, Cullen attended the local parochial schools, and graduated from St. Francis College in 1880. He engaged in the marine insurance and shipping business.

=== Early political career ===
Cullen was a member of the New York State Assembly (Kings Co., 3rd D.) in 1896, 1897 and 1898.

He was a member of the New York State Senate (3rd D.) from 1899 to 1918, sitting in the 122nd through 141st New York State Legislatures.

He was a delegate to the 1912, 1916, 1920, 1924, 1928 and 1932 Democratic National Conventions; and a member of the New York State Commission for the Panama–Pacific International Exposition in 1915.

=== Congress ===
Cullen elected as a Democrat to the Sixty-sixth and to the twelve succeeding Congresses and held office from March 4, 1919, until his death in Washington, D.C., in 1944; interment was in Holy Cross Cemetery, Brooklyn.

During his tenure, Cullen was considered a leader of the "Tammany Hall" delegation from New York and served on the powerful House Ways and Means Committee.

== See also ==
- List of members of the United States Congress who died in office (1900–1949)

New York State Assembly
Preceded by John F. Houghton	New York State Assembly; New York County, 3rd District; 1896–1898	Succeeded by James J. McInerney
New York State Senate
Preceded by Frank Gallagher	New York State Senate; 3rd District; 1899–1918	Succeeded by Peter J. McGarry
U.S. House of Representatives
Preceded by Harry H. Dale	Member of the U.S. House of Representatives from New York's 4th congressional district 1919–1944	Succeeded by John J. Rooney
