= 119th New York State Legislature =

New York state legislative session

←	118th	120th	→
- New York State Capitol (2009)

Overview
- Legislative body: New York State Legislature
- Jurisdiction: New York, United States
- Term: January 1 – December 31, 1896

Senate
- Members: 50
- President: Lt. Gov. Charles T. Saxton (R)
- Temporary President: Timothy E. Ellsworth (R)
- Party control: Republican (36-14)

Assembly
- Members: 150
- Speaker: Hamilton Fish II (R)
- Party control: Republican (103-47)

Sessions
- 1st: January 1 – April 30, 1896

The 119th New York State Legislature, consisting of the New York State Senate and the New York State Assembly, met from January 1 to April 30, 1896, during the second year of Levi P. Morton's governorship, in Albany.

== Background ==
Under the provisions of the New York Constitution of 1894, 50 Senators and 150 assemblymen were elected in single-seat districts; senators for a two-year term, assemblymen for a one-year term. The senatorial districts were made up of entire counties, except New York County (twelve districts), Kings County (seven districts), Erie County (three districts) and Monroe County (two districts). The Assembly districts were made up of contiguous area, all within the same county.

At this time there were two major political parties: the Republican Party and the Democratic Party. The Prohibition Party, the Socialist Labor Party and the People's Party also nominated tickets.

== Elections ==
The 1895 New York state election was held on November 5. The state officers and state senators were elected to an exceptional three-year term (for the sessions of 1896, 1897 and 1898), so that the election of these officers would be held, beginning in 1898, in even-numbered years, at the same time as the gubernatorial election.

All six statewide elective offices up for election was carried by the Republicans. The approximate party strength at this election, as expressed by the vote for Secretary of State, was: Republican 601,000; Democratic 511,000; Prohibition 25,000; Socialist Labor 21,000; and People's Party 7,000.

== Sessions ==
The Legislature met for the regular session at the State Capitol in Albany on January 1, 1896; and adjourned on April 30.

Hamilton Fish II (R) was re-elected Speaker.

Timothy E. Ellsworth (R) was elected president pro tempore of the State Senate.

== State Senate ==
=== Districts ===
- 1st District: Richmond and Suffolk counties
- 2nd District: Queens County
- 3rd District: 1st, 2nd, 3rd, 4th, 5th and 6th Ward of Brooklyn
- 4th District: 7th, 13th, 19th and 21st Ward of Brooklyn
- 5th District: 8th, 10th, 12th and 30th Ward of Brooklyn, and the annexed former Town of Gravesend
- 6th District: 9th, 11th, 20th and 22nd Ward of Brooklyn
- 7th District: 14th, 15th, 16th and 17th Ward of Brooklyn
- 8th District: 23rd, 24th, 25th and 29th Ward of the City of Brooklyn; and the Town of Flatlands
- 9th District: 18th, 26th, 27th and 28th Ward of Brooklyn
- 10th, 11th, 12th, 13th, 14th, 15th, 16th, 17th, 18th, 19th, 20th and 21st District: Parts of the City of New York, defined geographically by their bordering streets, regardless of Wards or Assembly districts
- 22nd District: Westchester County
- 23rd District: Orange and Rockland counties
- 24th District: Columbia, Dutchess and Putnam and counties
- 25th District: Greene and Ulster counties
- 26th District: Chenango, Delaware and Sullivan counties
- 27th District: Fulton, Hamilton, Montgomery and Schoharie counties
- 28th District: Saratoga, Schenectady and Washington counties
- 29th District: Albany County
- 30th District: Rensselaer County
- 31st District: Clinton, Essex and Warren counties
- 32nd District: Franklin and St. Lawrence counties
- 33rd District: Otsego and Herkimer counties
- 34th District: Oneida County
- 35th District: Jefferson and Lewis counties
- 36th District: Onondaga County
- 37th District: Oswego and Madison counties
- 38th District: Broome, Cortland and Tioga counties
- 39th District: Cayuga and Seneca counties
- 40th District: Chemung, Schuyler and Tompkins counties
- 41st District: Steuben and Yates counties
- 42nd District: Ontario and Wayne counties
- 43rd District: 4th, 6th, 7th, 8th, 12th, 13th, 14th, 16th, 17th and 18th Ward of Rochester; and the towns of Brighton, Henrietta, Irondequoit, Menden, Penfield, Perinton, Pittsford, Rush and Webster, in Monroe County
- 44th District: 1st, 2nd, 3rd, 5th, 9th, 10th, 11th, 15th, 19th and 20th Ward of Rochester; and the towns of Chili, Clarkson, Gates, Greece, Hamlin, Ogden, Parma, Riga, Sweden and Wheatland, in Monroe County
- 45th District: Genesee, Niagara and Orleans counties
- 46th District: Allegany, Livingston and Wyoming counties
- 47th District: 1st, 2nd, 3rd, 6th, 15th, 19th, 20th, 21st, 22nd, 23rd and 24th Ward of Buffalo
- 48th District: 4th, 5th, 7th, 8th, 9th, 10th, 11th, 12th, 13th, 14th and 16th Ward of Buffalo
- 49th District: 17th, 18th and 25th Ward of the City of Buffalo; and all area in Erie County outside Buffalo
- 50th District: Cattaraugus and Chautauqua counties

Note: There are now 62 counties in the State of New York. The counties which are not mentioned in this list had not yet been established, or sufficiently organized, the area being included in one or more of the abovementioned counties.

=== Members ===
The asterisk (*) denotes members of the previous Legislature who continued in office as members of this Legislature. Richard Higbie, Frank Gallagher, George W. Brush, Albert A. Wray, Julius L. Wieman, Samuel J. Foley, Frank D. Pavey, J. Irving Burns, George R. Malby, Benjamin M. Wilcox, Edwin C. Stewart and Simon Seibert changed from the Assembly to the Senate.

District	Senator	Party	Notes
1st	Richard Higbie*	Republican	
2nd	Theodore Koehler	Democrat	
3rd	Frank Gallagher*	Democrat	
4th	George W. Brush*	Republican	
5th	Michael J. Coffey*	Democrat	re-elected
6th	Peter H. McNulty	Democrat	
7th	Patrick H. McCarren	Democrat	
8th	Albert A. Wray*	Republican	
9th	Julius L. Wieman*	Republican	
10th	John F. Ahearn*	Democrat	re-elected
11th	Timothy D. Sullivan*	Democrat	re-elected
12th	Samuel J. Foley*	Democrat	
13th	Bernard F. Martin	Democrat	
14th	Thomas F. Grady	Democrat	
15th	Frank D. Pavey*	Republican	
16th	Louis Munzinger	Democrat	
17th	Charles B. Page	Republican	
18th	Maurice Featherson	Democrat	
19th	John Ford	Republican	
20th	Jacob A. Cantor*	Democrat	re-elected; Minority Leader
21st	Charles L. Guy*	Democrat	re-elected
22nd	J. Irving Burns*	Republican	
23rd	Clarence Lexow*	Republican	re-elected
24th	William C. Daley	Republican	
25th	Charles Davis	Republican	
26th	James Ballantine	Republican	died on May 4, 1896
27th	Hobart Krum	Republican	
28th	Edgar T. Brackett	Republican	
29th	Myer Nussbaum	Republican	
30th	LeGrand C. Tibbits	Republican	
31st	George Chahoon	Republican	
32nd	George R. Malby*	Republican	
33rd	Walter L. Brown	Republican	
34th	Henry J. Coggeshall*	Ind. Rep.	re-elected
35th	Joseph Mullin*	Republican	re-elected
36th	Horace White	Republican	
37th	Nevada N. Stranahan	Republican	
38th	William Elting Johnson	Republican	
39th	Benjamin M. Wilcox*	Republican	
40th	Edwin C. Stewart*	Republican	
41st	John S. Sheppard	Republican	
42nd	John Raines*	Republican	re-elected
43rd	Cornelius R. Parsons*	Republican	re-elected
44th	Henry Harrison	Republican	
45th	Timothy E. Ellsworth	Republican	elected President pro tempore
46th	Lester H. Humphrey	Republican	
47th	Charles Lamy*	Republican	re-elected
48th	Simon Seibert*	Republican	
49th	George Allen Davis	Republican	
50th	Frank W. Higgins*	Republican	re-elected

=== Employees ===
- Clerk: John S. Kenyon
- Sergeant-at-Arms: Garret J. Benson
- Doorkeeper: Nathan Lewis
- Stenographer: Edward Shaughnessy

== State Assembly ==
=== Assemblymen ===
District		Assemblymen	Party	Notes
Albany	1st	Robert G. Scherer	Republican	
Albany	2nd	James Keenholts*	Republican	
Albany	3rd	George T. Kelly	Democrat	
Albany	4th	Amos J. Ablett*	Republican	
Allegany		Fred A. Robbins*	Republican	
Broome	1st	Joseph H. Brownell*	Republican	
Broome	2nd	Charles F. Tupper	Republican	
Cattaraugus	1st	Charles H. Miller	Republican	
Cattaraugus	2nd	Girvease A. Matteson	Republican	
Cayuga	1st	W. Clarence Sheldon	Republican	
Cayuga	2nd	Eugene B. Rounds	Republican	
Chautauqua	1st	Jerome Babcock	Republican	
Chautauqua	2nd	S. Frederick Nixon*	Republican	
Chemung		John B. Stanchfield*	Democrat	Minority Leader
Chenango		Jotham P. Allds	Republican	
Clinton		Willis T. Honsinger*	Republican	
Columbia		Hugh W. McClellan	Democrat	
Cortland		Franklin P. Saunders	Republican	
Delaware		Delos H. Mackey	Republican	
Dutchess	1st	John A. Hanna	Republican	
Dutchess	2nd	Augustus B. Gray*	Republican	
Erie	1st	Cornelius Coughlin*	Democrat	
Erie	2nd	Henry W. Hill	Republican	
Erie	3rd	Benjamin A. Peever	Republican	
Erie	4th	Philip W. Springweiler	Republican	
Erie	5th	Charles Braun*	Republican	
Erie	6th	Christopher Smith	Republican	
Erie	7th	Henry L. Steiner	Republican	
Erie	8th	Heman M. Blasdell	Republican	
Essex		Albert Weed*	Republican	
Franklin		Thomas A. Sears*	Republican	
Fulton and Hamilton		Byron D. Brown	Republican	
Genesee		Archie D. Sanders	Republican	
Greene		Newton Sweet	Republican	
Herkimer		Oliver H. Springer	Republican	
Jefferson	1st	Walter Zimmerman	Republican	
Jefferson	2nd	Cornelius J. Clark	Republican	
Kings	1st	Thomas H. Wagstaff	Republican	
Kings	2nd	John McKeown*	Democrat	
Kings	3rd	Thomas H. Cullen	Democrat	
Kings	4th	George W. Wilson	Republican	
Kings	5th	Abram C. DeGraw	Republican	
Kings	6th	Arthur J. Audett*	Republican	
Kings	7th	Frederick A. Newman	Democrat	
Kings	8th	James Lennon Jr.	Democrat	
Kings	9th	John J. Cain*	Democrat	
Kings	10th	William L. Perkins	Republican	
Kings	11th	Joseph A. Guider	Democrat	
Kings	12th	Charles H. Ebbets	Democrat	
Kings	13th	Orrion L. Forrester	Republican	
Kings	14th	John M. Zurn	Democrat	
Kings	15th	Robert J. Rudd	Democrat	
Kings	16th	Edward C. Brennan	Republican	
Kings	17th	Henry Marshall	Republican	
Kings	18th	George E. Waldo	Republican	
Kings	19th	Frederick Schmid	Democrat	
Kings	20th	Frederick G. Hughes	Republican	
Kings	21st	Jacob A. Livingston	Republican	
Lewis		John S. Koster	Republican	
Livingston		Otto Kelsey*	Republican	
Madison		Lambert B. Kern*	Republican	
Monroe	1st	Charles J. Smith*	Republican	
Monroe	2nd	James M. E. O'Grady*	Republican	
Monroe	3rd	William W. Armstrong*	Republican	
Monroe	4th	Thomas H. Eddy	Republican	
Montgomery		Edward L. Schmidt	Republican	
New York	1st	Daniel E. Finn*	Democrat	
New York	2nd	Thomas J. Barry*	Democrat	
New York	3rd	William H. Leonard	Democrat	
New York	4th	James A. Donnelly*	Democrat	
New York	5th	George Gregory	Republican	
New York	6th	Jacob A. Mittnacht	Democrat	
New York	7th	Edward W. Hart	Democrat	
New York	8th	Charles S. Adler*	Republican	
New York	9th	James F. Maccabe	Democrat	
New York	10th	Otto Kempner	Democrat	
New York	11th	William H. Gledhill	Democrat	
New York	12th	Joseph Schulum	Democrat	
New York	13th	Patrick F. Trainor	Democrat	
New York	14th	Jacob Fritz	Democrat	
New York	15th	Thomas F. Myers	Democrat	
New York	16th	Benjamin Hoffman*	Democrat	
New York	17th	vacant	Assemblyman-elect Patrick J. Kerrigan (D) died on December 23, 1895	
New York	17th	Francis J. Goodman	Democrat	elected on March 3, to fill vacancy
New York	18th	Andrew J. Galligan	Democrat	
New York	19th	Albert C. Wilson	Republican	
New York	20th	John P. Corrigan*	Democrat	
New York	21st	George C. Austin	Republican	
New York	22nd	Daniel W. F. McCoy	Democrat	
New York	23rd	John M. Delmour	Democrat	
New York	24th	John B. Fitzgerald*	Democrat	
New York	25th	Patrick H. Murphy	Republican	
New York	26th	Patrick J. Andrews	Democrat	
New York	27th	Francis E. Laimbeer	Republican	
New York	28th	Joseph I. Green	Democrat	
New York	29th	Samuel G. French	Republican	
New York	30th	George W. Meyer Jr.	Democrat	
New York	31st	Harvey T. Andrews*	Republican	
New York	32nd	Thomas F. Donnelly	Democrat	
New York	33rd	Louis Davidson	Democrat	
New York	34th	Bernard H. Malone	Democrat	
New York	35th	Arthur C. Butts	Democrat	
Niagara	1st	Henry E. Warner	Republican	
Niagara	2nd	Frank A. Dudley	Republican	
Oneida	1st	Walter Embley	Democrat	
Oneida	2nd	William Cary Sanger*	Republican	
Oneida	3rd	William B. Graves	Republican	
Onondaga	1st	Charles C. Cole*	Republican	
Onondaga	2nd	Charles R. Rogers*	Republican	
Onondaga	3rd	Joseph Bondy	Republican	
Onondaga	4th	Edwin M. Wells	Republican	
Ontario		Charles A. Steele	Republican	
Orange	1st	Louis F. Goodsell*	Republican	
Orange	2nd	Louis Bedell	Republican	
Orleans		Fred L. Downs	Republican	
Oswego	1st	Louis P. Taylor	Republican	
Oswego	2nd	Thomas M. Costello	Republican	
Otsego		Charles B. Gorham	Republican	
Putnam		Hamilton Fish II*	Republican	re-elected Speaker
Queens	1st	Jacob Stahl	Democrat	
Queens	2nd	Frederic Storm	Republican	
Queens	3rd	Morton Cromwell	Republican	
Rensselaer	1st	Edward McGraw	Republican	
Rensselaer	2nd	John T. Norton*	Democrat	
Rensselaer	3rd	George Anderson	Republican	
Richmond		Gustav A. Barth	Democrat	
Rockland		Otis H. Cutler*	Republican	
St. Lawrence	1st	Ira C. Miles	Republican	
St. Lawrence	2nd	Martin V. B. Ives	Republican	
Saratoga		Charles H. McNaughton*	Republican	
Schenectady		Thomas W. Winne*	Republican	
Schoharie		David Enders	Democrat	
Schuyler		Oliver H. Budd	Republican	
Seneca		William H. Kinne	Democrat	
Steuben	1st	James S. Harrison	Republican	
Steuben	2nd	Joel Clark	Republican	
Suffolk	1st	Erastus F. Post	Republican	
Suffolk	2nd	Carll S. Burr Jr.	Republican	
Sullivan		Uriah S. Messiter	Republican	
Tioga		Daniel P. Witter	Republican	
Tompkins		Frederick E. Bates	Republican	
Ulster	1st	William S. Van Keuren*	Republican	
Ulster	2nd	James Lounsbery*	Republican	
Warren		Taylor J. Eldridge*	Republican	
Washington		William R. Hobbie	Republican	
Wayne		George S. Horton*	Republican	
Westchester	1st	John N. Stewart*	Republican	
Westchester	2nd	George L. Carlisle	Republican	
Westchester	3rd	James W. Husted*	Republican	
Wyoming		Mortimer N. Cole	Republican	
Yates		Everett Brown*	Republican	

=== Employees ===
- Clerk: Archie E. Baxter
- Financial Clerk: William C. Stevens
- Sergeant-at-Arms: Philip W. Reinhard Jr.
- Doorkeeper: Joseph Bauer
- Stenographer: Henry C. Lammert

== Sources ==
- The New York Red Book compiled by Edgar L. Murlin (published by James B. Lyon, Albany NY, 1897; see senators' bios pg. 133–177; senators' portraits between pg. 136 and 137; pg. 404 for list of senators; pg. 512f for assemblymen; pg. 712–716 for senate districts)
- The Tribune Almanac (1896)
