= 120th New York State Legislature =

New York state legislative session

←	119th	121st	→
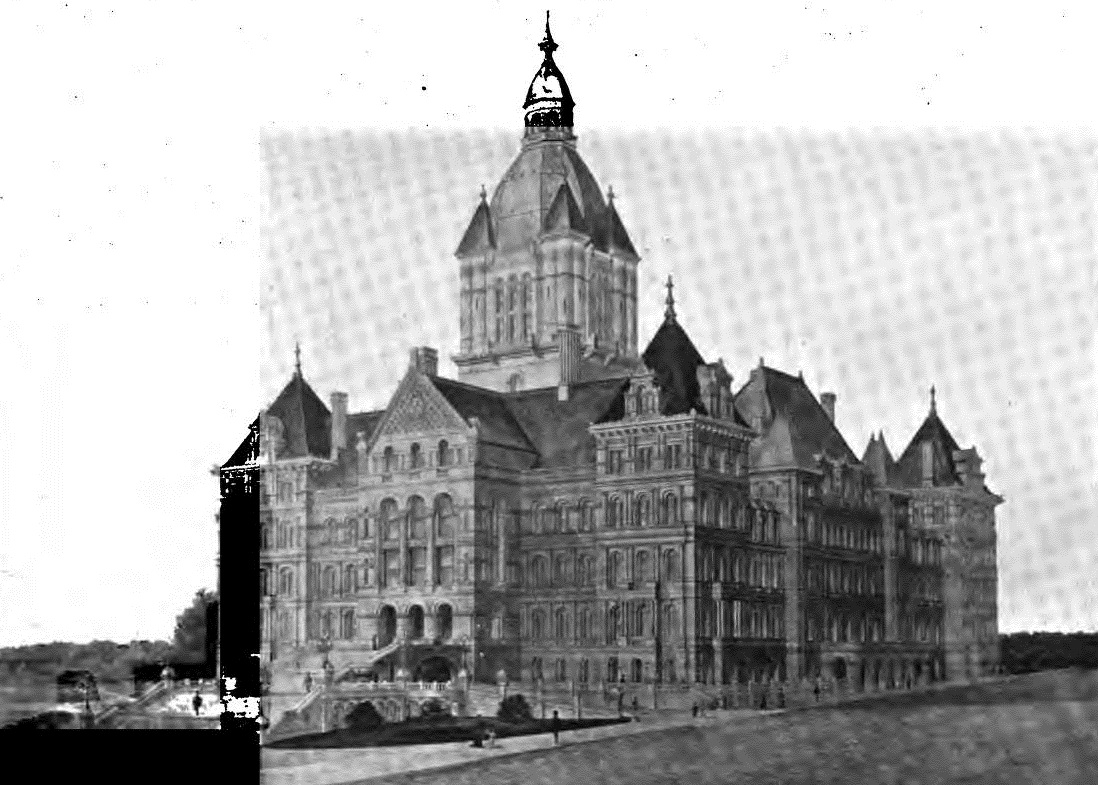
- New York State Capitol (1897)

Overview
- Legislative body: New York State Legislature
- Jurisdiction: New York, United States
- Term: January 1 – December 31, 1897

Senate
- Members: 50
- President: Lt. Gov. Timothy L. Woodruff (R)
- Temporary President: Timothy E. Ellsworth (R)
- Party control: Republican (36-14)

Assembly
- Members: 150
- Speaker: James M. E. O'Grady (R)
- Party control: Republican (114-36)

Sessions
- 1st: January 6 – April 24, 1897

The 120th New York State Legislature, consisting of the New York State Senate and the New York State Assembly, met from January 6 to April 24, 1897, during the first year of Frank S. Black's governorship, in Albany.

== Background ==
Under the provisions of the New York Constitution of 1894, 50 Senators and 150 assemblymen were elected in single-seat districts; senators for a two-year term, assemblymen for a one-year term. The senatorial districts were made up of entire counties, except New York County (twelve districts), Kings County (seven districts), Erie County (three districts) and Monroe County (two districts). The Assembly districts were made up of contiguous area, all within the same county.

At the 1895 New York state election, the state officers and state senators were elected to an exceptional three-year term (for the sessions of 1896, 1897 and 1898), so that the election of these officers would be held, beginning in 1898, in even-numbered years, at the same time as the gubernatorial election.

At this time there were two major political parties: the Republican Party and the Democratic Party. The Democrats were split into two factions as a result of the 1896 United States presidential election: the majority supported Free silver and William Jennings Bryan for U.S. president; a minority supported the Gold standard and John M. Palmer for U.S. president. The Socialist Labor Party, the Prohibition Party, and the People's Party also nominated tickets.

== Elections ==
The 1896 New York state election was held on November 3. Congressman Frank S. Black was elected Governor; and Timothy L. Woodruff was elected Lieutenant Governor; both Republicans.

The only other statewide elective office up for election was also carried by a Republican. The approximate party strength at this election, as expressed by the vote for Governor, was: Republican 788,000; Silver Democrats 570,000; Gold Democrats 27,000; Socialist Labor 18,000; Prohibition 17,000; and People's Party 5,000.

== Sessions ==
The Legislature met for the regular session at the State Capitol in Albany on January 6, 1897; and adjourned on April 24.

James M. E. O'Grady (R) was elected Speaker with 112 votes against 34 for Daniel E. Finn (D).

On January 19, the Legislature elected Thomas C. Platt (R) to succeed David B. Hill (D) as U.S. Senator from New York, for a six-year term beginning on March 4, 1897.

== New York State Senate ==
=== Districts ===
- 1st District: Richmond and Suffolk counties
- 2nd District: Queens County
- 3rd District: 1st, 2nd, 3rd, 4th, 5th and 6th Ward of Brooklyn
- 4th District: 7th, 13th, 19th and 21st Ward of Brooklyn
- 5th District: 8th, 10th, 12th and 30th Ward of Brooklyn, and the annexed former Town of Gravesend
- 6th District: 9th, 11th, 20th and 22nd Ward of Brooklyn
- 7th District: 14th, 15th, 16th and 17th Ward of Brooklyn
- 8th District: 23rd, 24th, 25th and 29th Ward of the City of Brooklyn; and the Town of Flatlands
- 9th District: 18th, 26th, 27th and 28th Ward of Brooklyn
- 10th, 11th, 12th, 13th, 14th, 15th, 16th, 17th, 18th, 19th, 20th and 21st District: Parts of the City of New York, defined geographically by their bordering streets, regardless of Wards or Assembly districts
- 22nd District: Westchester County
- 23rd District: Orange and Rockland counties
- 24th District: Columbia, Dutchess and Putnam and counties
- 25th District: Greene and Ulster counties
- 26th District: Chenango, Delaware and Sullivan counties
- 27th District: Fulton, Hamilton, Montgomery and Schoharie counties
- 28th District: Saratoga, Schenectady and Washington counties
- 29th District: Albany County
- 30th District: Rensselaer County
- 31st District: Clinton, Essex and Warren counties
- 32nd District: Franklin and St. Lawrence counties
- 33rd District: Otsego and Herkimer counties
- 34th District: Oneida County
- 35th District: Jefferson and Lewis counties
- 36th District: Onondaga County
- 37th District: Oswego and Madison counties
- 38th District: Broome, Cortland and Tioga counties
- 39th District: Cayuga and Seneca counties
- 40th District: Chemung, Schuyler and Tompkins counties
- 41st District: Steuben and Yates counties
- 42nd District: Ontario and Wayne counties
- 43rd District: 4th, 6th, 7th, 8th, 12th, 13th, 14th, 16th, 17th and 18th Ward of Rochester; and the towns of Brighton, Henrietta, Irondequoit, Menden, Penfield, Perinton, Pittsford, Rush and Webster, in Monroe County
- 44th District: 1st, 2nd, 3rd, 5th, 9th, 10th, 11th, 15th, 19th and 20th Ward of Rochester; and the towns of Chili, Clarkson, Gates, Greece, Hamlin, Ogden, Parma, Riga, Sweden and Wheatland, in Monroe County
- 45th District: Genesee, Niagara and Orleans counties
- 46th District: Allegany, Livingston and Wyoming counties
- 47th District: 1st, 2nd, 3rd, 6th, 15th, 19th, 20th, 21st, 22nd, 23rd and 24th Ward of Buffalo
- 48th District: 4th, 5th, 7th, 8th, 9th, 10th, 11th, 12th, 13th, 14th and 16th Ward of Buffalo
- 49th District: 17th, 18th and 25th Ward of the City of Buffalo; and all area in Erie County outside Buffalo
- 50th District: Cattaraugus and Chautauqua counties

Note: There are now 62 counties in the State of New York. The counties which are not mentioned in this list had not yet been established, or sufficiently organized, the area being included in one or more of the abovementioned counties.

=== Senators ===
The asterisk (*) denotes members of the previous Legislature who continued in office as members of this Legislature.

Note: For brevity, the chairmanships omit the words "...the Committee on (the)..."

District	Senator	Party	Notes
1st	Richard Higbie*	Republican	Chairman of Agriculture
2nd	Theodore Koehler*	Democrat	
3rd	Frank Gallagher*	Democrat	
4th	George W. Brush*	Republican	Chairman of Public Health
5th	Michael J. Coffey*	Democrat	
6th	Peter H. McNulty*	Democrat	
7th	Patrick H. McCarren*	Democrat	
8th	Albert A. Wray*	Republican	Chairman of Public Education
9th	Julius L. Wieman*	Republican	
10th	John F. Ahearn*	Democrat	
11th	Timothy D. Sullivan*	Democrat	
12th	Samuel J. Foley*	Democrat	
13th	Bernard F. Martin*	Democrat	
14th	Thomas F. Grady*	Democrat	
15th	Frank D. Pavey*	Republican	Chairman of Revision
16th	Louis Munzinger*	Democrat	
17th	Charles B. Page*	Republican	
18th	Maurice Featherson*	Democrat	
19th	John Ford*	Republican	
20th	Jacob A. Cantor*	Democrat	Minority Leader
21st	Charles L. Guy*	Democrat	
22nd	J. Irving Burns*	Republican	Chairman of Insurance
23rd	Clarence Lexow*	Republican	Chairman of Judiciary
24th	William C. Daley*	Republican	
25th	Charles Davis*	Republican	
26th	John Grant	Republican	elected to fill vacancy, in place of James Ballantine; Chairman of Public Printing
27th	Hobart Krum*	Republican	Chairman of Forest, Fish and Game Laws
28th	Edgar T. Brackett*	Republican	Chairman of Affairs of Villages
29th	Myer Nussbaum*	Republican	Chairman of Privileges and Elections
30th	LeGrand C. Tibbits*	Republican	
31st	George Chahoon*	Republican	Chairman of Trades and Manufactures
32nd	George R. Malby*	Republican	Chairman of Codes
33rd	Walter L. Brown*	Republican	Chairman of Miscellaneous Corporations
34th	Henry J. Coggeshall*	Ind. Rep.	
35th	Joseph Mullin*	Republican	Chairman of Finance; died on September 1, 1897
36th	Horace White*	Republican	Chairman of Printed and Engrossed Bills
37th	Nevada N. Stranahan*	Republican	Chairman of Affairs of Cities
38th	William Elting Johnson*	Republican	Chairman of Military Affairs
39th	Benjamin M. Wilcox*	Republican	Chairman of Penal Institutions
40th	Edwin C. Stewart*	Republican	Chairman of Internal Affairs of Towns and Counties
41st	John S. Sheppard*	Republican	Chairman of Roads and Bridges
42nd	John Raines*	Republican	Chairman of Railroads
43rd	Cornelius R. Parsons*	Republican	Chairman of Commerce and Navigation
44th	Henry Harrison*	Republican	
45th	Timothy E. Ellsworth*	Republican	President pro tempore; Chairman of Rules
46th	Lester H. Humphrey*	Republican	Chairman of Banks
47th	Charles Lamy*	Republican	Chairman of Canals
48th	Simon Seibert*	Republican	
49th	George Allen Davis*	Republican	Chairman of Indian Affairs
50th	Frank W. Higgins*	Republican	Chairman of Taxation and Retrenchment

=== Employees ===
- Clerk: John S. Kenyon
- Sergeant-at-Arms: Garret J. Benson
- Doorkeeper: Nathan Lewis
- Stenographer: Edward Shaughnessy
- Journal Clerk: Lafayette B. Gleason
- Index Clerk: Ernest A. Fay

== New York State Assembly ==
=== Assemblymen ===
Note: For brevity, the chairmanships omit the words "...the Committee on (the)..."

District		Assemblymen	Party	Notes
Albany	1st	Robert G. Scherer*	Republican	Chairman of Judiciary
Albany	2nd	James B. McEwan	Republican	
Albany	3rd	George T. Kelly*	Democrat	
Albany	4th	Jacob D. Leversee	Republican	
Allegany		Fred A. Robbins*	Republican	
Broome	1st	Charles E. Fuller	Republican	
Broome	2nd	Charles F. Tupper*	Republican	
Cattaraugus	1st	Charles H. Miller*	Republican	
Cattaraugus	2nd	Girvease A. Matteson*	Republican	
Cayuga	1st	W. Clarence Sheldon*	Republican	
Cayuga	2nd	Eugene B. Rounds*	Republican	
Chautauqua	1st	Frederick R. Peterson	Republican	
Chautauqua	2nd	S. Frederick Nixon*	Republican	Majority Leader; Chairman of Ways and Means
Chemung		John H. Holbert	Republican	
Chenango		Jotham P. Allds*	Republican	Chairman of Excise
Clinton		Everett C. Baker	Republican	Chairman of State Prisons
Columbia		Robert Hoes	Republican	
Cortland		Franklin P. Saunders*	Republican	Chairman of Printed and Engrossed Bills
Delaware		Delos H. Mackey*	Republican	
Dutchess	1st	John A. Hanna*	Republican	
Dutchess	2nd	Augustus B. Gray*	Republican	Chairman of Banks
Erie	1st	Cornelius Coughlin*	Democrat	
Erie	2nd	Henry W. Hill*	Republican	Chairman of Revision
Erie	3rd	William Maloney	Democrat	
Erie	4th	William Schneider	Republican	
Erie	5th	Charles Braun*	Republican	Chairman of Charitable and Religious Societies
Erie	6th	Nicholas J. Miller	Republican	
Erie	7th	Henry L. Steiner*	Republican	Chairman of Privileges and Elections
Erie	8th	Heman M. Blasdell*	Republican	
Essex		James H. Pierce	Republican	previously a member from Franklin Co.
Franklin		Thomas A. Sears*	Republican	Chairman of Claims
Fulton and Hamilton		Byron D. Brown*	Republican	
Genesee		Archie D. Sanders*	Republican	Chairman of Labor and Industries
Greene		Newton Sweet*	Republican	
Herkimer		Oliver H. Springer*	Republican	
Jefferson	1st	Walter Zimmerman*	Republican	Chairman of Unfinished Business
Jefferson	2nd	Cornelius J. Clark*	Republican	
Kings	1st	Thomas H. Wagstaff*	Republican	
Kings	2nd	John McKeown*	Democrat	
Kings	3rd	Thomas H. Cullen*	Democrat	
Kings	4th	George W. Wilson*	Republican	Chairman of Trades and Manufactures
Kings	5th	John C. Knaup	Republican	
Kings	6th	Edward H. M. Roehr	Republican	
Kings	7th	George H. Parshall	Republican	
Kings	8th	James Lennon Jr.*	Democrat	
Kings	9th	John J. Cain*	Democrat	
Kings	10th	William L. Perkins*	Republican	
Kings	11th	Lucien S. Bayliss	Republican	
Kings	12th	Henry E. Abell	Republican	
Kings	13th	Orrion L. Forrester*	Republican	
Kings	14th	John M. Zurn*	Democrat	
Kings	15th	Joseph Murray	Republican	
Kings	16th	Edward C. Brennan*	Republican	
Kings	17th	Henry Marshall*	Republican	
Kings	18th	George J. Soper	Republican	
Kings	19th	Frederick Schmid*	Democrat	
Kings	20th	Frederick G. Hughes*	Republican	
Kings	21st	Henry S. French	Democrat	
Lewis		John S. Koster*	Republican	Chairman of Military Affairs
Livingston		Otto Kelsey*	Republican	
Madison		Robert J. Fish	Republican	
Monroe	1st	Merton E. Lewis	Republican	
Monroe	2nd	James M. E. O'Grady*	Republican	elected Speaker; Chairman of Rules
Monroe	3rd	William W. Armstrong*	Republican	Chairman of Codes
Monroe	4th	Frederick E. Gott	Republican	
Montgomery		Edward L. Schmidt*	Republican	
New York	1st	Daniel E. Finn*	Democrat	Minority Leader
New York	2nd	Thomas J. Barry*	Democrat	
New York	3rd	William H. Leonard*	Democrat	
New York	4th	Patrick H. Roche	Democrat	
New York	5th	Richard Van Cott	Republican	
New York	6th	Timothy P. Sullivan	Democrat	
New York	7th	Edward W. Hart*	Democrat	
New York	8th	Charles S. Adler*	Republican	
New York	9th	James F. Maccabe*	Democrat	
New York	10th	Jeremiah J. Sullivan	Republican	
New York	11th	William H. Gledhill*	Democrat	
New York	12th	Joseph Schulum*	Democrat	
New York	13th	Patrick F. Trainor*	Democrat	
New York	14th	Jacob Fritz*	Democrat	
New York	15th	Thomas F. Myers*	Democrat	
New York	16th	Benjamin Hoffman*	Democrat	
New York	17th	John A. Dempsey	Democrat	
New York	18th	John F. Daly	Democrat	
New York	19th	Robert Mazet	Republican	
New York	20th	John P. Corrigan*	Democrat	
New York	21st	George C. Austin*	Republican	Chairman of Affairs of Cities
New York	22nd	Daniel D. Tooher	Democrat	
New York	23rd	Richard Gilleland	Democrat	
New York	24th	John B. Fitzgerald*	Democrat	
New York	25th	Patrick H. Murphy*	Republican	Chairman of Public Health
New York	26th	Patrick J. Andrews*	Democrat	
New York	27th	Francis E. Laimbeer*	Republican	
New York	28th	Joseph I. Green*	Democrat	
New York	29th	Lawrence E. Brown	Republican	
New York	30th	George W. Meyer Jr.*	Democrat	
New York	31st	Harvey T. Andrews*	Republican	
New York	32nd	Thomas F. Donnelly*	Democrat	
New York	33rd	James P. Degnan	Republican	
New York	34th	Philip W. Reinhard Jr.	Republican	
New York	35th	Douglas Mathewson	Republican	
Niagara	1st	Henry E. Warner*	Republican	
Niagara	2nd	Frank A. Dudley*	Republican	Chairman of Taxation and Retrenchment
Oneida	1st	George E. Philo	Republican	
Oneida	2nd	William Cary Sanger*	Republican	Chairman of Public Education
Oneida	3rd	William B. Graves*	Republican	Chairman of Indian Affairs
Onondaga	1st	William J. Bellen	Republican	
Onondaga	2nd	Edward G. Ten Eyck	Republican	
Onondaga	3rd	Joseph Bondy*	Republican	Chairman of Canals
Onondaga	4th	Edwin M. Wells*	Republican	
Ontario		Murray Benham	Republican	
Orange	1st	Louis F. Goodsell*	Republican	Chairman of Electricity, Gas and Water Supply
Orange	2nd	Louis Bedell*	Republican	Chairman of Trust Investigation
Orleans		Fred L. Downs*	Republican	Chairman of Affairs of Villages
Oswego	1st	Louis P. Taylor*	Republican	Chairman of Federal Relations
Oswego	2nd	Thomas M. Costello*	Republican	
Otsego		Charles B. Gorham*	Republican	Chairman of Public Lands and Forestry
Putnam		Emerson W. Addis	Republican	
Queens	1st	Thomas F. Kennedy	Democrat	
Queens	2nd	Harvey Stewart McKnight	Republican	
Queens	3rd	Morton Cromwell*	Republican	
Rensselaer	1st	Edward McGraw*	Republican	Chairman of Public Institutions
Rensselaer	2nd	William Hutton Jr.	Democrat	
Rensselaer	3rd	George Anderson*	Republican	
Richmond		George Garby	Republican	
Rockland		Frederick L. Whritner	Republican	
St. Lawrence	1st	Ira C. Miles*	Republican	
St. Lawrence	2nd	Martin V. B. Ives*	Republican	Chairman of Agriculture
Saratoga		George W. Kavanaugh	Republican	
Schenectady		Thomas W. Winne*	Republican	
Schoharie		George M. Palmer	Democrat	
Schuyler		Oliver H. Budd*	Republican	
Seneca		Harry M. Glen	Republican	Chairman of Public Printing
Steuben	1st	James S. Harrison*	Republican	Chairman of Soldiers' Home
Steuben	2nd	Joel Clark*	Republican	
Suffolk	1st	Erastus F. Post*	Republican	
Suffolk	2nd	Carll S. Burr Jr.*	Republican	
Sullivan		George McLaughlin	Republican	
Tioga		Daniel P. Witter*	Republican	Chairman of Internal Affairs
Tompkins		Frederick E. Bates*	Republican	
Ulster	1st	William S. Van Keuren*	Republican	Chairman of Commerce and Navigation
Ulster	2nd	Harcourt J. Pratt	Republican	
Warren		Taylor J. Eldridge*	Republican	Chairman of Railroads
Washington		William R. Hobbie*	Republican	Chairman of Fisheries and Game
Wayne		George S. Horton*	Republican	Chairman of General Laws
Westchester	1st	Alfred E. Smith	Republican	
Westchester	2nd	Richard S. Emmet Jr.	Republican	died on February 7, 1897
Westchester	3rd	James W. Husted*	Republican	Chairman of Insurance
Wyoming		Mortimer N. Cole*	Republican	
Yates		Miles W. Raplee	Republican	

=== Employees ===
- Clerk: Archie E. Baxter
- Financial Clerk: William C. Stevens
- Sergeant-at-Arms: James C. Crawford
- Doorkeeper: Joseph Bauer
- Second Assistant Doorkeeper: Eugene L. Demers
- Stenographer: Henry C. Lammert
- Assistant Journal Clerk: Sanford W. Smith
- Chief of the Revision Room: Jean L. Burnett
- Committee Clerk: William L. Coughtry
- General Committee Clerk: Jacob A. Livingston

== Sources ==
- The New York Red Book compiled by Edgar L. Murlin (published by James B. Lyon, Albany NY, 1897; see pg. 133–177 for senators' bios; between pg. 136 and 137 for senators' portraits; pg. 179–279 for assemblymen's bios; between pg. 184 and 185 for assemblymen's portraits; pg. 404 for list of senators; pg. 513 for list of assemblymen; and pg. 712–716 for senate districts)
