= Charles Lamy (New York politician) =

American politician

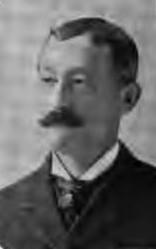
- Lamy in 1893

Member of the New York State Senate
- In office January 2, 1894 – December 31, 1898
- Constituency: 30th District (1894-1896); 47th District (1896-1898)

Personal details
- Born: May 7, 1849 East Eden, New York
- Died: February 21, 1929 (aged 79) Buffalo, New York
- Party: Republican

Charles Lamy (May 7, 1849 – February 21, 1929) was an American merchant and a New York state senator.

== Life ==
Born in East Eden, New York on May 7, 1849. He attended the district schools, and then became a clerk in a grocery store in Buffalo. On June 10, 1875, he married Magdalena Urban. In 1876, he opened his own store, and subsequently became the owner of a wholesale and retail grocery, and hardware, flour and feed stores. He was President of the Magnus Beck Brewery, and also engaged in the real estate business. On June 10, 1885, he married Clara B. Demeyer. He died in Buffalo, New York on February 21, 1929.

He was a member of the New York State Senate from January 2, 1894 to December 31, 1898, sitting in the 117th, 118th (both 30th District), 119th, 120th and 121st New York State Legislatures (all three 47th District). He was a member of the Republican Party.

New York State Senate
Preceded by Greenleaf S. Van Gorder	New York State Senate; 30th District; 1894–1895	Succeeded by LeGrand C. Tibbits
Preceded by new district	New York State Senate; 47th District; 1896–1898	Succeeded by William F. Mackey
