= Henry Wolfert =

American politician (1826-1898)

Henry Wolfert (January 26, 1826 – December 16, 1898) was a German-American businessman and politician.

== Life ==
Wolfert was born on January 26, 1826, in Bobstadt, the Grand Duchy of Baden. He immigrated to America in 1846. He settled in East New York, a neighborhood in Brooklyn. He worked as a cigar dealer on 2586 Fulton St.

In 1871, Wolfert was elected constable of New Lots. In 1872, he was elected as justice of the peace of New Lots and to the East New York Board of Education. In 1873 he was the New Lots school trustee. In 1874, he was elected Justice of Sessions, to which he was re-elected to in 1875. In 1884, he was elected town supervisor for New Lots, and in 1890 he was elected town supervisor for Brooklyn's 26th Ward. He was at first a member of the Whig Party, but later became a stout Republican.

In 1893, Wolfert was elected to the New York State Senate, representing the Sixth District. His opponent John McCarty was initially declared the winner, but accusations of voter fraud led Wolfert to be named senator instead. He served in the State Senate in 1894 and 1895.

Wolfert died at home on December 16, 1898. He was buried in All Faiths Cemetery in Middle Village, Queens.

New York State Senate
Preceded by John F. Ahearn	New York State Senate; 6th District; 1894–1895	Succeeded by Peter H. McNulty
