= Benjamin Hoffman =

American politician (1864–1922)

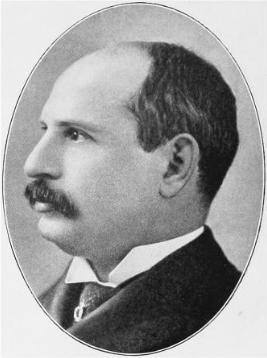

Member of the New York State Assembly
- In office 1896–1899
- Constituency: New York County 16th District
- In office 1895
- Constituency: New York County 6th District

Personal details
- Born: April 15, 1864 New York, New York, US
- Died: May 20, 1922 (aged 58) New York, New York, US
- Resting place: Linden Hill Cemetery
- Party: Democratic
- Spouse: Rebecca Fuld
- Education: New York University School of Law
- Occupation: Lawyer, politician, judge

Benjamin Hoffman (April 15, 1864 – May 20, 1922) was a Jewish-American lawyer, politician, and judge from New York.

== Life ==
Hoffman was born on April 15, 1864, in New York City, New York, the son of David L. Hoffman and Babette Heilman. His parents were both German immigrants, his father immigrating to America from Maßbach, Bavaria and his mother from Württemberg.

Hoffman graduated from the New York University School of Law with an LL.B. in 1885. He then studied law under Alfred Steckler. He was admitted to the bar in 1887, after which he practiced law with his brother Charles L. Hoffman for many years. He became a member of Tammany Hall in 1891. He lived on the Lower East Side.

In 1894, Hoffman was elected to the New York State Assembly as a Democrat, representing the New York County 6th District. He served in the Assembly in 1895, 1896, 1897, 1898, and 1899. He was a minority member of the 1899 Mazet Special Committee that investigated the affairs of New York City. In 1899, he was elected Judge of the Municipal Court. He was re-elected to the office in 1909 despite opposition from the Bar Association as he retained his political leadership. He was again elected to the office in 1919 and was still serving as Municipal Court Justice when he died.

Hoffman attended Congregation Rodeph Sholem. He was a director of the Hebrew Free Burial Association and a member of the Odd Fellows, the Freemasons, the Educational Alliance, Mt. Sinai Hospital, and the Israel Orphan Asylum. He was married to Rebecca Fuld, and their children were Belle (Mrs. Isidore Wells), Eva (Mrs. Nathan Ries), Ruth, and Joseph B. Rebecca was politically active in her own right, serving as a Democratic co-leader of the Sixth Assembly District since women gained the right to vote, a delegate to multiple Democratic National Conventions, founder, president, and treasurer of the Progress Relief Society, and Register of New York County. She was elected to the latter office in 1929, the only woman nominee in New York City to win that year, making her the highest paid woman official in the state and the first Jewish woman in the United States to be elected by a major party for a county office.

Hoffman died at home from a stroke of apoplexy on May 20, 1922. His funeral was one of the largest on the Lower East Side at the time, with over 5,000 people watching the funeral procession. The pallbearers were Marcus Loew, David Lazarus, Samuel Koenig, New York Supreme Court Justices Charles L. Guy, Mitchell L. Erlanger, and Leonard A. Giegerich, Justice Aaron J. Levy, Magistrate Max S. Levine, E. J. Ahearn, Henry M. Goldfogle, Senator Fitzgerald, and A. S. Rosenberg. He was buried in Linden Hill Cemetery.

New York State Assembly
Preceded by Moses Dinkelspiel	New York State Assembly; New York County, 6th District; 1895	Succeeded by Jacob A. Mittnacht
Preceded by Charles Steinberg	New York State Assembly; New York County, 16th District; 1896–1899	Succeeded by Samuel Prince
