= William H. Gledhill =

American politician (1858–1920)

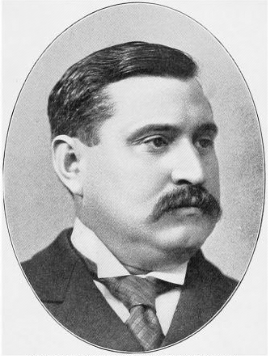

Member of the New York State Assembly from the New York County 11th district
- In office January 1, 1896 – December 31, 1897
- Preceded by: Frank D. Pavey
- Succeeded by: John J. O'Connor

Personal details
- Born: William Henry Gledhill; May 9, 1858 New York City, U.S.
- Died: January 7, 1920 (aged 61) New York City, U.S.
- Resting place: Calvary Cemetery, New York City, U.S.
- Party: Democratic
- Children: 2
- Occupation: Politician

William Henry Gledhill (May 9, 1858 – January 7, 1920) was an American politician from New York.

== Life ==
Gledhill was born on May 9, 1858, in New York City, New York.

After he finished school at 14, he began working with his father as a member of the wallpaper manufacturing firm Henry Gledhill & Co.

In 1895, Gledhill was elected to the New York State Assembly as a Democrat, representing the New York County 11th District. He served in the Assembly in 1896 and 1897. In 1897, he was elected to the Board of Alderman and then became vice-president of the Board. In 1905, he became clerk of Part VI, Special Term, the New York Supreme Court in New York County.

Gledhill had a wife, son, and daughter. He was a member of the Ancient Order of United Workmen.

Gledhill died at his home in Flushing of pneumonia on January 7, 1920. He was buried in Calvary Cemetery.

New York State Assembly
Preceded by Frank D. Pavey	New York State Assembly; New York County, 11th District; 1896–1897	Succeeded by John J. O'Connor
