= John Lewis Childs =

American horticultural entrepreneur and politician

Senator John Lewis Childs
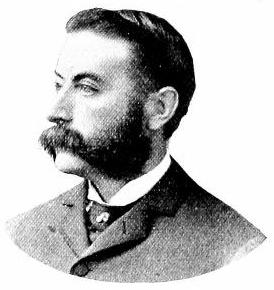

Member of the New York Senate from the 1st district
- In office 1894–1895
- Preceded by: Edward Floyd-Jones
- Succeeded by: Richard Higbie

Personal details
- Born: May 13, 1856 Jay, Maine
- Died: 6 March 1921 (aged 64) Floral Park, New York
- Party: Republican
- Spouse: Caroline Goldsmith Childs
- Occupation: Horticulturalist

John Lewis Childs (May 13, 1856 – March 6, 1921) was a horticultural businessman and politician who founded Floral Park, New York. In addition to a widespread reputation for being a zealous ornithologist, Childs is also credited with founding the first mail order seed catalog business in the United States.

== About ==
Childs was born in Franklin County, Maine, and grew up in Buckfield. His career in horticulture began in 1874, when he took a job with C. L. Allen of Queens. Soon afterwards he began renting, then buying land in nearby East Hinsdale, Queens County, near other nurseries.

=== Business ===
Within five years of building his own seed and bulb business and starting America's first seed catalog business, Childs established a bustling business. The volume of his business is attributed with the expansion of the Floral Park Post Office and nearby village businesses. Additionally, Childs was responsible for building more than 20 buildings in Floral Park, including hotels, lumber mills and his own printing press. He also provided a public park for the community, built the first school in town, and served as the first village president, which later became the office of mayor.

=== Politics ===
He was a Republican member of the New York State Senate (1st D.) in 1894 and 1895, and during his term he ferried a bill establishing a State Normal School in nearby Jamaica. He ran twice unsuccessfully for a seat in the U.S. Congress.

=== Land holdings ===
Childs bought a great deal of land in the area around Floral Park. His extensive land holdings related mainly to his seed catalog business, with more than 1,000 acres (4.0 km^{2}) used for that purpose near St. James, New York and eastern Long Island. Today, "Flowerfields" is an area within St. James that was founded by Childs around 1909. His nursery estate at Flowerfield included its own railroad station and a private post office.

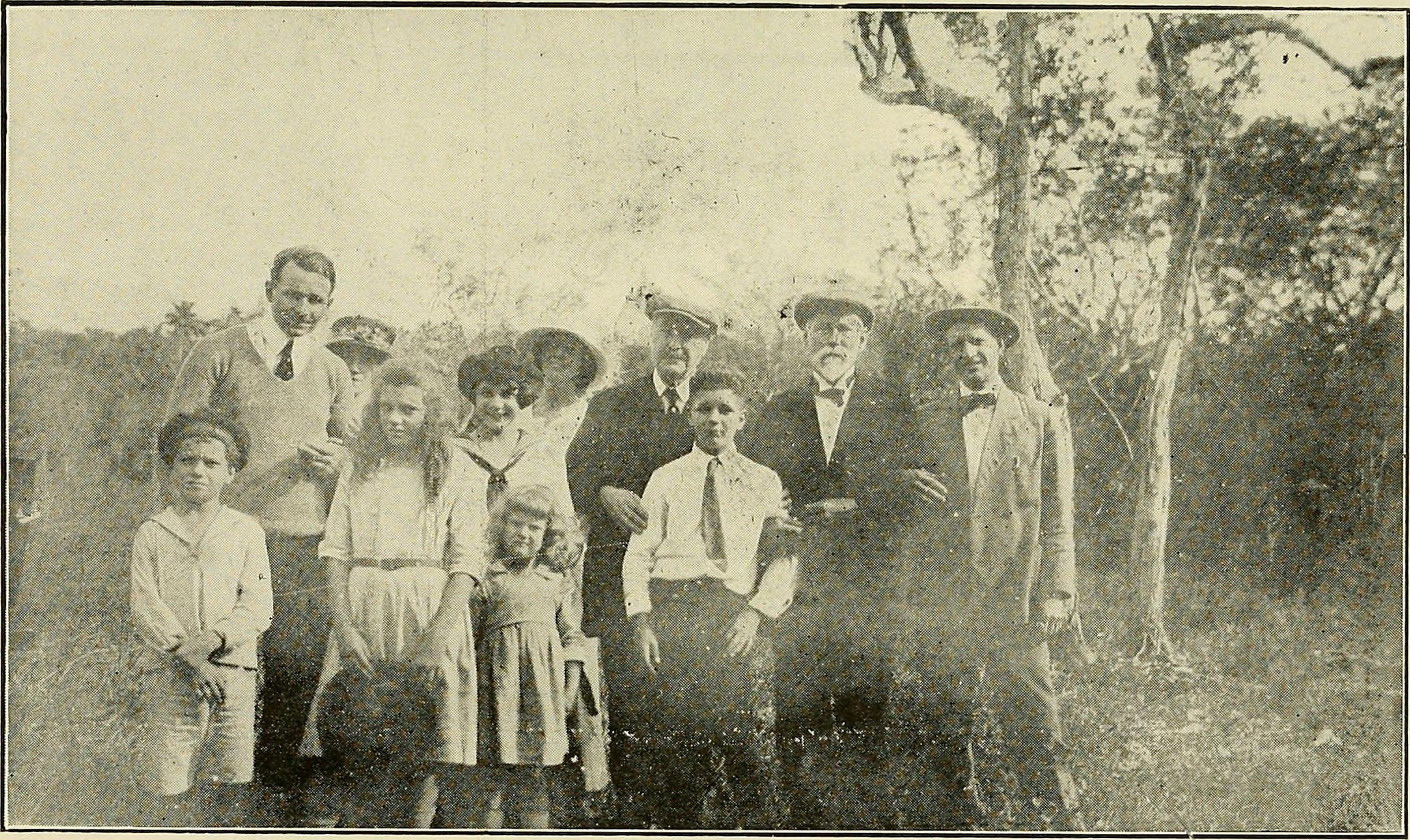
Childs with friends in Florida

=== Ornithology ===
Childs was an elected member of the American Ornithological Union and maintained one of the largest private ornithology libraries in the United States. He possessed the largest privately held collection of over 1,100 mounted North American birds, most with nests and eggs. He personally collected more than 700 specimens of this collection. He was also a friend of John Burroughs, who contributed articles on birds to Childs’ magazine, The Warbler. Childs published the journal from 1906 to 1913.

== Death ==
Childs died aboard a New York Central train from Albany to New York City in 1921. His company continued to operate in the 1920s, only stopping in the Great Depression. His wife sold the seed catalog operation to the Edward T. Bromfield Seed Company in the mid-1920s. Childs’ realty holdings were sold in the mid-1930s, valued by the broker at $2,000,000. Childs's ornate 18 room Victorian house in Floral Park was torn down in 1950.

New York State Senate
Preceded by Edward Floyd-Jones	New York State Senate; 1st District; 1894–1895	Succeeded by Richard Higbie
