= James S. Fairbrother =

American politician (1851–1905)

James Samuel Fairbrother (February 24, 1851 – February 18, 1905) was an American politician who was a member of the New York State Assembly from 1894 to 1895.

== Life ==
Fairbrother was born on February 24, 1851, in New York City, New York. He moved to Maspeth with his parents when he was a child.

Fairbrother attended the Old Brook School in Maspeth. He worked as assistant superintendent of a large oil-cloth works. He was also a charter member and first foreman of the Maspeth steamer company, the first president of the Newtown fire department, and the president of the Newtown Provident Association.

In 1893, Fairbrother was elected to the New York State Assembly as a Republican, representing the Queens County 2nd District. He served in the Assembly in 1894 and 1895. While in the Assembly, he submitted bills to prohibit the use of soft coal of a certain low grade in cities, amend the charter of Long Island City, permit the payment of an allowance to families of fatally injured firemen, and amend the Code of Criminal Procedure in regard to disorderly conduct.

Fairbrother was the Master of his Freemason lodge and a member of the Knights Templar, the Royal Arch Masonry, and the Shriners. He attended St. Saviour's Protestant Episcopal Church of Maspeth since he was a child. He spent the last few years of his life living in Newtown. He was unmarried.

Fairbrother died at his sister's home in Newtown on February 18, 1905. He was buried in Mount Olivet Cemetery in Maspeth.

New York State Assembly
Preceded by Samuel V. Searing	New York State Assembly; Queens County, 2nd District; 1894–1895	Succeeded by Frederic Storm
