= Joseph Bauer =

German-American labor organizer and politician

Joseph Bauer (April 18, 1845 – October 12, 1938) was a German-American labor organizer and politician.

== Life ==
Bauer was born on April 18, 1845, in the Grand Duchy of Baden. When he was seven, he immigrated with his parents to America, settling in Rochester, New York. He began working as a shoemaker when he was fourteen, and was working in the profession when the American Civil War broke out.

In October 1861, at the age of 16, Bauer enlisted in the 8th New York Volunteer Cavalry Regiment. He was mustered in as a private in Company K a month later. In June 1863, he transferred to the 5th New York Independent Light Artillery. He was mustered out with the rest of his battery in July 1865. He fought in a number of battles, including the Battle of Gettysburg; he intended to attend the 1938 Gettysburg reunion, but he broke his foot beforehand and had to stay home for health reasons.

After the War, he worked as a shoemaker in a number of cities, including Buffalo, Cleveland, and Elmira, before settling for good in Rochester. He was active in organized labor and was a member of the Knights of Labor and the American Federation of Labor. In the 1880s, he organized a union of horsecar railway employees. He was also marshal of Rochester's first Labor Day parade.

In 1888, Bauer was elected to the New York State Assembly as a Republican, representing the Monroe County 2nd District. He served in the Assembly in 1889. He was appointed Doorkeeper of the Assembly in 1894, 1895, 1896, 1897, and 1898.

Bauer was an active member of the Grand Army of the Republic. He was elected Commander of the New York State Department in 1937. He served as grand marshal Rochester's Memorial Day parades. His first wife was Louisa Wolf of Buffalo. They had ten children together. She died in 1915. In 1934, he married Mrs. Fannie Hamman, who died in 1936.

Bauer died in Genesee Hospital on October 12, 1938 at the age of 93. He had seven surviving children, 24 grandchildren, 37 great-grandchildren, and 15 great-great-grandchildren. He was buried in Mount Hope Cemetery.

New York State Assembly
Preceded by P. Andrew Sullivan	New York State Assembly; Monroe County, 2nd District; 1889	Succeeded by P. Andrew Sullivan
