= Oliver H. Budd =

American politician

Oliver H. Budd (June 26, 1846 – July 3, 1917) was an American farmer and politician from New York.

== Life ==
Budd was born on June 26, 1846, the son of Robert Curry Budd and Mina Foster, in Peach Orchard, New York.

Budd worked as a farmer. He took up fruit culture and eventually became one of the largest landowners in the county. He also raised blooded horses. He served as president of the Schuyler County Agricultural Society. He was also a director of the Glen National Bank from its opening to his death.

Budd was elected town supervisor of Hector twice. In 1895, he was elected to the New York State Assembly as a Republican, representing Schuyler County. He served in the Assembly in 1896 and 1897.

In 1873, Budd married Mary L. Woodward. They had two daughters, Clementine and Frances.

== Death ==
Budd died at home from a hemorrhage on July 3, 1917. He was buried in Peach Orchard cemetery.

New York State Assembly
Preceded by George A. Snyder	New York State Assembly; Schuyler County; 1896-1897	Succeeded by Charles A. Sloane
