= Henry W. Hill =

American politician (1853–1929)

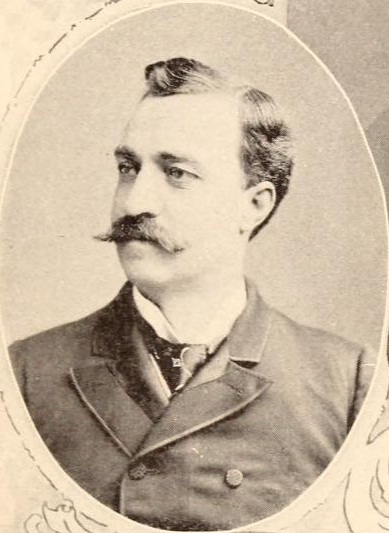
Hill c. 1902

Henry Wayland Hill (November 13, 1853 – December 6, 1929) was an American lawyer, writer and politician from New York.

== Life ==
He was born on November 13, 1853, in Isle La Motte, Grand Isle County, Vermont, the son of Dyer Hill, a member of the Vermont Legislature in 1849 and 1850, and Martha P. (Hall) Hill. He attended the common schools and worked on his father's farm. He graduated A.B. from the University of Vermont in 1876, and then taught school. He was Principal of Swanton Academy from 1877 to 1879; and of the Academy and Union School at Chateaugay, New York from 1879 to 1883.

On August 11, 1880, he married Harriet A. Smith (1858–1939). In 1881, he received the degree of Master of Arts from Vermont University. While teaching, he also studied law, was admitted to the bar in 1884, and practiced in Buffalo, New York.

Hill was a delegate to the New York State Constitutional Convention of 1894; and a member of the New York State Assembly (Erie Co., 2nd D.) in 1896, 1897, 1898, 1899 and 1900. In 1900, the University of Vermont conferred on him the degree of LL.D.

He was a member of the New York State Senate from 1901 to 1910, sitting in the 124th, 125th, 126th, 127th, 128th, 129th (all six 47th D.), 130th, 131st, 132nd and 133rd New York State Legislatures (all four 48th D.).

He was President of the Buffalo Historical Society from 1910 until his death; and in 1923 edited Municipality of Buffalo, New York: A History, 1720–1923.

He died on December 6, 1929, in Buffalo, New York, of a heart attack after a long illness; and was buried at the Riverside Cemetery in Swanton, Vermont.

== Sources ==
New York State Assembly
| Preceded by Simon Seibert | New York State Assembly; Erie County, 2nd District; 1896–1900 | Succeeded by Edward R. O'Malley |
New York State Senate
| Preceded by William F. Mackey | New York State Senate; 47th District; 1901–1906 | Succeeded by Stanislaus P. Franchot |
| Preceded by Louis Fechter, Sr. | New York State Senate; 48th District; 1907–1910 | Succeeded by Frank M. Loomis |
