= Simon Seibert =

American politician

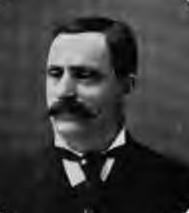
Seibert c. 1897

Simon Seibert (September 12, 1857 Buffalo, Erie County, New York – 1917) was an American politician from New York.

== Life ==
He attended the public schools. In 1893, he became a clerk in the City Treasurer's office.

Seibert was a member of the New York State Assembly (Erie Co., 2nd D.) in 1894 and 1895.

He was a member of the New York State Senate (48th D.) from 1896 to 1898, sitting in the 119th, 120th and 121st New York State Legislatures.

He was an alternate delegate to the 1896 Republican National Convention; and a delegate to the 1900 Republican National Convention.

Seibert was a presidential elector in the 1904 presidential election.

He was buried at the Forest Lawn Cemetery, Buffalo.

== Sources ==
- The New York Red Book compiled by Edgar L. Murlin (published by James B. Lyon, Albany NY, 1897; pg. 169, 404 and 511)
- Sketches of the members of the Legislature in The Evening Journal Almanac (1895; pg. 54)
- VOTE OF NEW YORK SPLIT in NYT on March 15, 1896
- NEW YORK'S DELEGATION in NYT on June 11, 1900

New York State Assembly
Preceded by Jacob Goldberg	New York State Assembly; Erie County, 2nd District; 1894–1895	Succeeded by Henry W. Hill
New York State Senate
Preceded by new district	New York State Senate; 40th District; 1896–1898	Succeeded by Samuel J. Ramsperger
