= Albert A. Wray =

American politician (1858–1924)

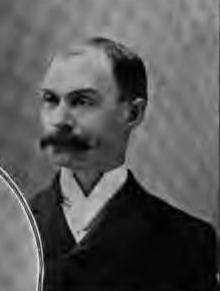
- Wray in 1897

Member of the New York State Senate from the 8th district
- In office January 1, 1896 – December 31, 1898
- Preceded by: John F. Ahearn
- Succeeded by: Henry Marshall

Member of the New York State Assembly from the Kings County 15th district
- In office January 1, 1894 – December 31, 1895
- Preceded by: George H. Deitsch
- Succeeded by: Robert J. Rudd

Personal details
- Born: Albert Alexander Wray; September 6, 1858 Cape Girardeau, Missouri, U.S.
- Died: February 23, 1924 (aged 65) West Orange, New Jersey, U.S.
- Party: Republican
- Spouse: Jessie Anne (divorced)
- Children: 4
- Occupation: Politician, lawyer

Albert Alexander Wray (September 6, 1858 – February 23, 1924) was an American lawyer and politician from New York.

== Life ==
Albert A. Wray was born in Cape Girardeau, Missouri, on September 6, 1858. He attended the public schools, and taught school in Missouri. He removed to New York City in 1880, studied law, was admitted to the bar in 1885, and practiced law in New York City, but resided in Brooklyn from 1888 on.

Wray was a member of the New York State Assembly (Kings Co., 15th D.) in 1894 and 1895.

He was a member of the New York State Senate (8th D.) from 1896 to 1898, sitting in the 119th, 120th and 121st New York State Legislatures.

In 1905, he and his wife Jessie Anne were divorced, and the four children remained with their mother. In 1909, she sued him to receive unpaid alimony amounting to $30,000. At this time, Wray lived with his second wife in West Orange, New Jersey.

Albert A. Wray died at his home in West Orange on February 23, 1924.

New York State Assembly
Preceded by George H. Deitsch	New York State Assembly; Kings County, 15th District; 1894–1895	Succeeded by Robert J. Rudd
New York State Senate
Preceded by John F. Ahearn	New York State Senate; 8th District; 1896–1898	Succeeded by Henry Marshall
