= George A. Snyder =

American politician

George Andrew Snyder (September 22, 1852 – January 17, 1932) was an American farmer and politician from New York.

== Life ==
Snyder was born on September 22, 1852, in Catharine, New York, the son of Adam Snyder and Jane E. Darling.

When Snyder was 13, he and his family moved to a farm a mile east of Burdett. When he was 20, he began working for his father on the farm. When the father moved to Burdett, Snyder bought the farm from him and an additional 65-acre tract. He engaged in general farming and made a specialty of sheep-raising. He later left the farm and moved to the Snyder Homestead in Burdett.

Snyder served as town supervisor of Hector from 1890 to 1893. In 1893, he was elected to the New York State Assembly as a Republican, representing Schuyler County. He served in the Assembly in 1894 and 1895. He also served as village president.

In 1873, Snyder married Annette Mead. He was a trustee of the Burdett Presbyterian church.

Snyder died in the Arnot-Ogden Hospital in Elmira on January 17, 1932. He was buried in the family plot in Hector Union Cemetery.

New York State Assembly
Preceded by William H. Wait	New York State Assembly; Schuyler County; 1894-1895	Succeeded by Oliver H. Budd
