= Charles S. Adler =

American politician (1862–1911)

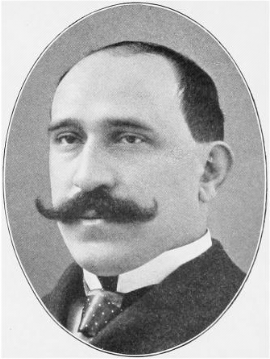

Member of the New York State Assembly
- In office 1896–1899, 1901–1902
- Constituency: New York County 8th District
- In office 1895
- Constituency: New York County 3rd District

Personal details
- Born: May 9, 1862 New York, New York, US
- Died: April 5, 1911 (aged 48) New York, New York, US
- Party: Republican

Charles S. Adler (May 9, 1862 – April 5, 1911) was a Jewish-American politician from New York.

== Life ==
Adler was born on May 9, 1862, in New York City, New York. He initially worked as an office boy and later became a confidential man and commercial traveller of a business firm. A resident of the Lower East Side, he was a tailor's apprentice as a boy and devised a machine for cutting cloth which was used in shops all over the Lower East Side.

In 1894, Adler was elected to the New York State Assembly as a Republican, representing the New York County 3rd District. He served in the Assembly in 1895, 1896, 1897, 1898, 1899, 1901, and 1902. In the 1902 United States House of Representatives election, he was a congressional candidate for New York's 9th congressional district. He lost the election to Henry M. Goldfogle. In 1903, he was appointed port warden of the Port of New York. In the 1906 United States House of Representatives election, he again ran as the Republican candidate in the 9th congressional district, but he again lost the election to Goldfogle. In the 1908 United States presidential election, he was a Presidential elector for William Howard Taft and James S. Sherman.

Adler was a member of the Freemasons and the Elks. He was Jewish.

Adler died at home on April 5, 1911. After a funeral service in Temple Rodeph Sholom, he was buried in Mount Hope Cemetery in Cypress Hills.

New York State Assembly
Preceded by Jacob A. Mittnacht	New York State Assembly; New York County, 3rd District; 1895	Succeeded by William H. Leonard
Preceded by Alfred R. Conkling	New York State Assembly; New York County, 8th District; 1896–1899	Succeeded by Isidor Cohn
Preceded by Isidor Cohn	New York State Assembly; New York County, 8th District; 1901–1902	Succeeded by Isidor Cohn
