= James A. Donnelly =

American politician

James Ambrose Donnelly (July 6, 1870 – April 12, 1952) was an American lawyer, politician, and judge from New York.

== Life ==
Donnelly was born on July 6, 1870, in New York City, New York. He studied law in the law office of W. Bourke Cockran and attended New York University School of Law. He graduated with an LL.B. honorable mentions in 1892 and was admitted to the bar in 1893. He acted as private secretary for Cockran while the latter was in Congress from 1893 to 1894. He practiced law in 31 Nassau St.

In 1894, Donnelly was elected to the New York State Assembly as a Democrat, representing the New York County 4th District. He served in the Assembly in 1895 and 1896. In 1898, he moved to the Bronx. He was Clerk of the Surrogates' Court in New York County from 1903 to 1906. He later practiced law Cockran. He was Deputy Attorney General of New York from 1907 to 1908, and served as the first Assistant Bronx County District Attorney from 1914 to 1918. He then served as assistant corporation counsel from 1918 to 1926. In 1926, Governor Alfred E. Smith appointed him Justice of the City Court, Bronx County. He served on the bench until 1941, when he left due to the 70-year age limit. He then joined his son Walter as a partner in the law firm Donnelly and Donnelly. He retired from the practice in 1950.

Donnelly was married to Etta Rice. Their children were Mrs. Clarence Pope, Mrs. Charles Dagit, Walter A., William B., and James A. Jr. He was a member of the Bronx County Bar Association, the Catholic Lawyers Guild, the Knights of Columbus, the Irish-American Historical Society, and the Friends of Erin.

Donnelly died at his home in Riverdale from a cerebral hemorrhage on April 12, 1952.

New York State Assembly
Preceded by Patrick H. Roche	New York State Assembly; New York County, 4th District; 1895–1896	Succeeded by Patrick H. Roche
