= Joseph Schulum =

American politician

Joseph Schulum (December 19, 1839 – February 4, 1906) was a Jewish German-American cigar manufacturer and politician.

== Life ==
Schulum was born on December 19, 1839, in the Kingdom of Hanover. He immigrated to America with his parents when he was young, settling in New York City.

After attending Mrs. Hatfield's School at Ridge and Broome Streets for two years, Schulum began working as a cigar maker. In 1871, he became a cigar manufacturer.

In 1895, Schulum was elected to the New York State Assembly as a Democrat, representing the New York County 12th District. He served in the Assembly in 1896, 1897, and 1898.

Schulum never married, and lived with his sister Fannie. He lived on the Lower East Side, and belonged a number of organizations from that area. He was a member of the Free Sons of Israel and the Freemasons.

Schulum died at home of pneumonia on February 4, 1906. He was buried in Salem Fields Cemetery.

New York State Assembly
Preceded by Edward B. La Fetra	New York State Assembly; New York County, 12th District; 1896-1898	Succeeded by Leon Sanders
