= Louis F. Goodsell =

American politician

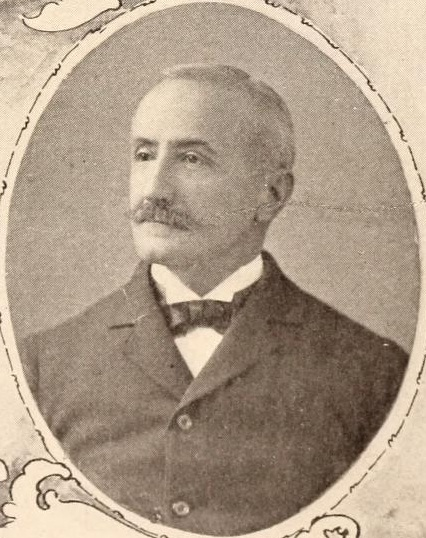
Goodsell c. 1902

Louis F. Goodsell (January 30, 1847 – May 26, 1924) was an American businessman and politician from New York.

== Life ==
He was born on January 30, 1847, in Germany. The family emigrated to the United States in 1850, and settled in Highland Falls, New York. He attended Holbrook's Military Academy, in Sing Sing; and Bryant and Stratton's Business College, in Poughkeepsie. During the American Civil War he fought from 1864 to 1865 with the 47th New York Volunteers, and then returned to school.

In 1867, he became a hotel clerk at Cozzen's Hotel in West Point; and later that year went to Omaha, Nebraska when Cozzen rented the Cozzens House Hotel there. He returned in 1869 to Newburgh, New York, and ran the U.S. Hotel there until 1878; and afterwards ran the Pulaski Hotel in Savannah, Georgia until 1883. Then he went to Chicago, and engaged in the oil business, and also engaged in the lumber business in Ottumwa, Iowa. In 1887, he sold out his business interests and returned to Highland Falls.

He was Supervisor of the Town of Highlands for eight years.

Goodsell was a member of the New York State Assembly (Orange Co., 1st D.) in 1895, 1896, 1897 and 1898.

He was a member of the New York State Senate (23rd D.) from 1899 to 1906, sitting in the 122nd, 123rd, 124th, 125th, 126th, 127th, 128th and 129th New York State Legislatures.

In 1910, he was investigated for having received $24,000 from lobbyists to push legislation forward. The money was paid into his account at a stock broker firm in Binghamton.

He died on May 26, 1924; and was buried at the Peacedale Cemetery in Highland Falls, New York.

== Sources ==
- Sketches of the members of the Legislature in The Evening Journal Almanac (1895; pg. 61)
- The New York Red Book compiled by Edgar L. Murlin (published by James B. Lyon, Albany NY, 1897; pg. 214f and 512f)
- RAILROAD LOBBYISTS GOOD TO GOODSELL in NYT on September 10, 1910
- AQUEDUCT MEN SEEK PAY in NYT on June 13, 1912
- Civil War Hero Dies in NYT on May 28, 1924 (subscription required)

New York State Assembly
Preceded by Howard Thornton	New York State Assembly; Orange County, 1st District; 1895–1898	Succeeded by James G. Graham
New York State Senate
Preceded by Clarence Lexow	New York State Senate; 23rd District; 1899–1906	Succeeded by Francis M. Carpenter
