= Stephen S. Blake =

Irish-American lawyer and politician (1843–1929)

Stephen Stacpoole Blake (February 10, 1843 – March 16, 1929) was an Irish-American lawyer, politician, and judge.

== Life ==
Blake was born on February 10, 1843 in County Clare, Ireland. His great-uncle was Cornelius O'Brien. He immigrated to America when he was around eight.

Blake graduated from Niagara University in 1865. He then spent two years at the Seminary in Montreal, Canada and graduated from Albany Law School as class orator in 1872. While in the latter school, he was a classmate of Chief Judge Alton B. Parker. He then went to Bridgeport, Connecticut, where he was elected City Clerk, served as Alderman for three years, was both Town Attorney and Prosecuting Attorney, and was appointed City Court Judge for four annual terms by the Connecticut State Legislature. In the 1880 election, he was the unsuccessful Democratic candidate for Secretary of State.

Blake moved to New York City, New York in 1881 and quickly gained a large and lucrative practice in civil and criminal law. He was consul for some forty homicide cases, only one of which resulted in a capital punishment. He served as president of the Tammany Hall General Committee of the 25th Assembly District for two years and was president of the Sachem Club. He was offered the position of Assistant District Attorney during John R. Fellows's second term as District Attorney, but he declined the offer.

By 1894, Blake was senior member of the law firm Blake & Sullivan, with offices at 63-65 Park Row. He was a delegate to the 1894 New York State Constitutional Convention. In 1894, he was elected to the New York State Assembly as a Democrat, representing the New York County 14th District. He won the election by only 32 votes over Republican candidate George E. Morey. He served in the Assembly in 1895. He then served as Assistant District Attorney under Asa Bird Gardiner and Eugene A. Philbin. He continued to practice law until he retired in 1919.

Blake died at home on March 16, 1929. He had five children. He was buried in Bridgeport.

New York State Assembly
Preceded by John P. Corrigan	New York State Assembly; New York County, 14th District; 1895	Succeeded by Jacob Fritz
