= Frederick D. Kilburn =

American politician

Frederick Douglass Kilburn (July 25, 1850 – December 2, 1917) was an American lawyer and politician from New York.

== Life ==
Kilburn was born on July 25, 1850, in Clinton County, New York, the son of Henry G. Kilburn and Sophronia Evans. When he was young, he moved with his family to Fort Covington, where his father began practicing law. In 1870, the family moved to Malone.

Kilburn attended Fort Covington Academy and Franklin Academy. He began studying law in the office of Judge Taylor. He then secured a legislative clerkship in Albany and graduated from Albany Law School. After graduating, he practiced law with Taylor. He later became a member of the law firm Gilbert, Badger & Kilburn, followed by the firm Hobbs & Kilburn. In 1885, he left his law practice and became vice-president and manager of the Peoples National Bank of Malone. He also served as town clerk, clerk of the board of supervisors, and county treasurer.

From 1891 to 1892, Kilburn was a member of the New York Republican State Committee. In 1893, he was elected to the New York State Senate as a Republican, representing New York's 21st State Senate district. He served in the State Senate in 1894 and 1895. He introduced a large number of bills in the State Senate related to Adirondack Park. In 1896, Governor Morton appointed him Superintendent of the New York State Banking Department. He resigned from office in January 1907, after Charles Evans Hughes became Governor. He then president of the Fidelity Realty Company. He also served as head of the Malone Light and Power Company from 1907 to 1914.

Kilburn was a member of the National Guard, serving as lieutenant of the 27th Separate Company for several years. During World War I, Kilburn was chairman of the Home Defense Committee of Franklin County and the Franklin County Red Cross chapter. Both of his sons fought in the War.

In 1875, Kilburn was married to Clara Berry. They had three children, James, Clarence, and Mrs. Ward B. Castle. He was a member of the Freemasons and the Elks. He was a member of the Centenary Methodist Episcopal Church.

Kilburn died of a brain hemorrhage at the Clifton Springs Sanitarium on December 2, 1917. He was buried in Morningside Cemetery.

New York State Senate
Preceded by Joseph Mullin	New York State Senate; 21st District; 1894–1895	Succeeded by Charles L. Guy
