= Everett Brown (politician) =

American farmer and politician (1850-1909)

Everett Brown (October 19, 1850 – August 30, 1909) was an American farmer and politician from New York.

== Life ==
Brown was born on October 19, 1850, in Italy, New York. He was the son of J. Warren and Rosalia Brown. The Brown family moved to Jerusalem, New York when Everett was young.

After attending Penn Yan Academy, Brown started working in the grape-growing and nursery business. In 1893, he was selected to be the first general manager and salesman of the Central New York Grape Growers' Union. He was a Freemason and a Knight of Pythias.

Brown was a presidential elector for the 1888 presidential election, voting for President Benjamin Harrison and Vice-President Levi P. Morton.

In 1890, Brown was elected to the New York State Assembly as a Republican, representing Yates County. He served in the Assembly in 1891, 1892, 1895, and 1896. He returned to the Assembly as a Committee Clerk in 1903, 1904, and 1908, and was the New York State Senate's Assistant Sergeant-at-Arms in 1905, 1906, and 1907.

He married Mary E. Cairnes in 1870. They had two daughters, Nellie May and Rosalia.

Brown died at home on August 30, 1909. He was buried in Lakeview Cemetery in Penn Yan.

New York State Assembly
Preceded by Calvin J. Huson	New York State Assembly; Yates County; 1891–1892	Succeeded by Morris F. Sheppard
Preceded by A. Flagg Robson	New York State Assembly; Yates County; 1895–1896	Succeeded by Miles W. Raplee
