= Martin T. McMahon =

American jurist, soldier, and politician (1838–1906)

Martin Thomas McMahon
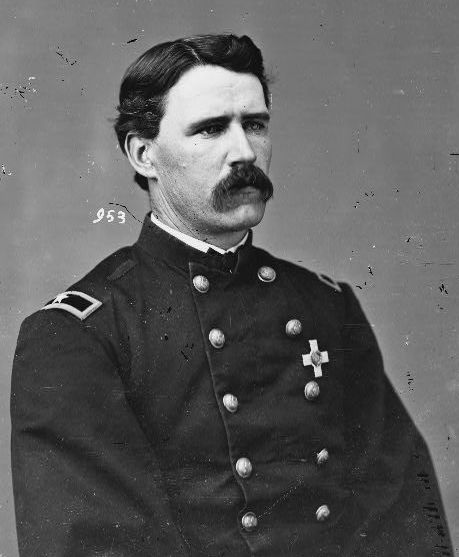
- McMahon in military uniform

Judge of the New York Court of General Sessions
- In office 1896–1906

Member of the New York Senate from the 7th district
- In office 1894–1895
- Preceded by: George F. Roesch
- Succeeded by: Patrick H. McCarren

Member of the New York Senate from the 8th district
- In office 1892–1893
- Preceded by: Lispenard Stewart
- Succeeded by: John F. Ahearn

Member of the New York State Assembly from the New York County, 7th district
- In office 1891–1891
- Preceded by: Francis V. King
- Succeeded by: Alfred R. Conkling

Personal details
- Born: March 21, 1838 La Prairie, Lower Canada
- Died: April 21, 1906 (aged 68) New York City, New York, U.S.
- Resting place: Arlington National Cemetery
- Party: Democratic
- Education: St. John's College, Fordham (now Fordham University)
- Occupation: Jurist, soldier, politician
- Awards: Medal of Honor

Military service
- Allegiance: United States of America; Union
- Branch/service: United States Army; Union Army
- Years of service: 1861–1866
- Rank: Lieutenant Colonel; Brevet Major General
- Unit: Army of the Potomac
- Battles/wars: American Civil War: Battle of White Oak Swamp

Martin Thomas McMahon (March 21, 1838 – April 21, 1906) was an American jurist and a Union Army officer during the American Civil War. He was awarded the United States military's highest decoration, the Medal of Honor, for his actions at the Battle of White Oak Swamp. After the war, he held various legal and judicial positions in the state of New York. He briefly served as the Minister Resident to Paraguay and was a member of the New York State Senate and New York State Assembly.

== Early life ==
McMahon was born in La Prairie, Lower Canada, to a family of recent migrants from Waterford, Ireland. The family moved to the United States when McMahon was an infant and settled in New York. He graduated from St. John's College, Fordham (now Fordham University), in 1855 and then studied law in Buffalo, receiving his Master's degree in 1857. After his schooling, he traveled west and worked as a special agent for the post office on the Pacific coast. He was admitted to the Sacramento, California, bar in 1861.

== Civil War service ==
At the outbreak of the Civil War, McMahon raised a company of cavalry and was given the rank of captain at the head of that unit. After learning that his company would not be sent to the front lines, he resigned his command and returned east, where he was appointed aide-de-camp to General George B. McClellan. McMahon remained with the Army of the Potomac throughout the war, eventually rising to the rank of lieutenant colonel. He served as aide-de-camp to William B. Franklin from May 1862 to January 1863 and as Chief of Staff and Assistant Adjutant General of the VI Corps from January 1, 1863, to August 1865, serving under John Sedgwick and Horatio G. Wright. McMahon was with VI Corps commander John Sedgwick at Spotsylvania when Sedgwick was killed. McMahon was the author of Maj. Gen. John Sedgwick - In Memoriam (1885).

McMahon's two older brothers were also officers in the war, both with the 164th New York Volunteer Infantry. John Eugene McMahon (1834–1863) commanded the 164th before being injured; he later died of these injuries. Middle brother James Power McMahon (1836–1864) took over the regiment and led it until his death at the Battle of Cold Harbor.

McMahon was mustered out of the volunteers on February 21, 1866.

=== Brevet promotions ===
On January 13, 1866, President Andrew Johnson nominated McMahon for appointment to the grade of brevet brigadier general of volunteers, to rank from March 13, 1865, and the United States Senate confirmed the appointment on March 12, 1866.

On March 16, 1866, President Johnson nominated McMahon for appointment to the grade of brevet major general of volunteers, also to rank from March 13, 1865, and the United States Senate confirmed the appointment on April 10, 1866.

=== Medal of Honor citation ===
Decades after the end of the conflict, on March 10, 1891, McMahon was awarded the Medal of Honor for his actions at the Battle of White Oak Swamp on June 30, 1862. His official citation reads:

Under fire of the enemy, successfully destroyed a valuable train that had been abandoned and prevented it from falling into the hands of the enemy.

== Post-war career ==
After the war, McMahon was elected as a companion of the New York Commandery of the Military Order of the Loyal Legion of the United States. He received a Doctor of Laws degree from St. John's College, Fordham.

He served as New York City's corporation counsel for two years before becoming the United States minister to Paraguay, a position he held from 1868 to 1869. After returning to the United States, he served as the Receiver of Taxes in New York from 1873 to 1885 and then worked as a U.S. Marshal for four years. During this time, he became connected with the National Soldiers' Home, of which he served as president for several years.

=== War of the Triple Alliance ===
While serving as Minister Resident to Paraguay during the Paraguayan War (also known as the War of the Triple Alliance), McMahon was a fierce champion of Francisco Solano López and wrote many articles favorable to the Paraguayans.

== Political career and death ==
McMahon was a member of the New York State Assembly (New York County, 7th District) in 1891. He was then a member of the New York State Senate from 1892 to 1895, sitting in the 115th and 116th legislatures (both 8th District), and the 117th and 118th New York State Legislatures (both 7th District).

He was elected a judge of the New York Court of General Sessions in 1896 and held that position until his death.

He died suddenly on April 21, 1906, at his home in Manhattan, one day after falling ill with pneumonia. He was 68 years old.

== See also ==
- List of American Civil War brevet generals (Union)
- United States Ambassador to Paraguay
- Paraguayan War

New York State Assembly
Preceded by Francis V. King	New York State Assembly; New York County, 7th District; 1891	Succeeded by Alfred R. Conkling
New York State Senate
Preceded by Lispenard Stewart	New York State Senate; 8th District; 1892–1893	Succeeded by John F. Ahearn
Preceded by George F. Roesch	New York State Senate; 7th District; 1894–1895	Succeeded by Patrick H. McCarren
