= Joseph Mullin (state senator) =

American politician

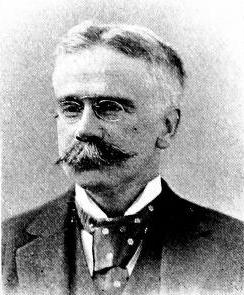
Mullin c. 1893

Joseph Mullin (May 29, 1848 in Watertown, Jefferson County, New York – September 1, 1897 in New York City) was an American lawyer and politician from New York.

== Life ==
He was the son of Supreme Court Justice Joseph Mullin (1811–1882). He attended the public schools, and graduated from Rensselaer Polytechnic Institute in 1869. He was admitted to the bar, and practiced law in Watertown.

He was a delegate to the 1888 Republican National Convention.

He was a member of the New York State Senate from 1892 until his death in 1897, sitting in the 115th, 116th (both 21st D.), 117th, 118th (both 22nd D.), 119th and 120th (both 35th D.).

He died on September 1, 1897, in his bedroom at the University Club in New York City, of "heart disease", and was buried at the Brookside Cemetery in Watertown.

== Sources ==
- The New York Red Book compiled by Edgar L. Murlin (published by James B. Lyon, Albany NY, 1897; pg. 404)
- Sketches of the members of the Legislature in The Evening Journal Almanac (1895; pg. 50)
- SENATOR MULLIN IS DEAD in NYT on September 3, 1897

New York State Senate
Preceded by George B. Sloan	New York State Senate; 21st District; 1892–1893	Succeeded by Frederick D. Kilburn
Preceded by Henry J. Coggeshall	New York State Senate; 22nd District; 1894–1895	Succeeded by J. Irving Burns
Preceded by new district	New York State Senate; 35th District; 1896–1897	Succeeded by Elon R. Brown
