= Richard Higbie =

American politician

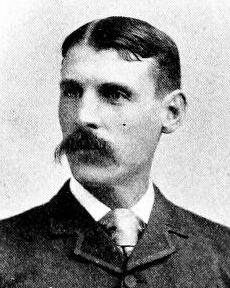
Richard Higbie (1893)

Richard Higbie (July 11, 1857 in West Islip, Suffolk County, New York – April 10, 1900 in Babylon, Suffolk Co., New York) was an American politician from New York.

== Life ==
He attended the public schools, and then became a merchant.

He was Supervisor of the Town of Babylon for four years.

Higbie was a member of the New York State Assembly (Suffolk Co.) in 1893, 1894 and 1895.

He was a member of the New York State Senate (1st D.) from 1896 to 1898, sitting in the 119th, 120th and 121st New York State Legislatures. He was also a member of the New York State Republican Committee.

He died on April 10, 1900, at his home in Babylon, New York, of "heart disease". He died soon after returning from a local political convention held at Amityville at which he had been elected a delegate to the Republican state convention

== Sources ==
- The New York Red Book compiled by Edgar L. Murlin (published by James B. Lyon, Albany NY, 1897; pg. 150f, 404 and 510ff)
- Sketches of the members of the Legislature in The Evening Journal Almanac (1895; pg. 63)
- DEATH OF RICHARD HIGBIE in NYT on April 11, 1900

New York State Assembly
Preceded by James H. Pierson	New York State Assembly; Suffolk County; 1893–1895	Succeeded by Erastus F. Post (1st D.); Carll S. Burr Jr. (2nd D.)
New York State Senate
Preceded by John Lewis Childs	New York State Senate; 1st District; 1896–1898	Succeeded by John L. Havens
