= Edward W. Hart =

American politician (1852–1924)

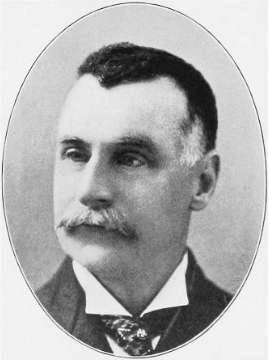

Member of the New York State Assembly
- In office 1896–1897
- Constituency: New York County 7th District

Personal details
- Born: October 28, 1852 New York, New York, US
- Died: May 27, 1924 (aged 71) New York, New York, US
- Party: Democratic

Edward W. Hart (October 28, 1852 – May 27, 1924) was an American politician from New York.

== Biography ==
Hart was born on October 28, 1852, in New York City, New York. He was Catholic.

After finishing school, Hart worked as an office boy in the Howe Sewing Machine Company. He later became a clerk for the wholesale dry goods house Cochran, McLean & Co. After it went out of business, he began drifting to city politics. In 1877, he became a night watchman for the Fire Department. He then became foreman of a street repair gang with the Department of Public Works. In 1888, he was appointed to the City Excise Board.

In 1895, Hart was elected to the New York State Assembly as a Democrat, representing the New York County 7th District. He served in the Assembly in 1896 and 1897. In 1898, he was appointed Coroner of New York City. In 1903, he began working in the City Clerk's office. When the Marriage License Bureau was established in 1908, he was appointed its Chief Clerk. He retired in 1922, when he reached 70. He personally issued most of the nearly 550,000 licenses the Bureau granted until that point.

Hart died at home from heart disease on May 27, 1924.

New York State Assembly
Preceded by Henry William Hoops, Jr.	New York State Assembly; New York County, 7th District; 1896–1897	Succeeded by John F. Maher
