= James M. E. O'Grady =

American politician

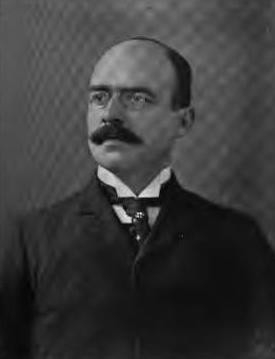
- O'Grady c. 1897
- Born: March 31, 1863; Rochester, New York, U.S.
- Died: November 3, 1928 (aged 65); Rochester, New York, U.S.
- Occupations: Lawyer, politician
- Known for: Speaker of the New York State Assembly, U.S. Representative
- Predecessor: Hamilton Fish II
- Successor: S. Frederick Nixon
- Political party: Republican

James Mary Early O'Grady (March 31, 1863 Rochester, Monroe County, New York – November 3, 1928 Rochester, Monroe Co., NY) was an American lawyer and politician. He was Speaker of the New York State Assembly for two terms and served one term in Congress.

== Life ==
He graduated from the University of Rochester in 1885. He studied law, was admitted to the bar in 1885, and practiced in Rochester. He served as member of the Board of Education of Rochester from 1887 to 1892, and was president in 1891 and 1892.

He was a member of the New York State Assembly (Monroe Co., 2nd D.) in 1893, 1894, 1895, 1896, 1897 and 1898; and was Speaker in 1897 and 1898.

O'Grady was elected as a Republican to the 56th United States Congress, holding office from March 4, 1899, to March 3, 1901. Afterwards he resumed the practice of law in Rochester. He was interred in the Holy Sepulchre Catholic Cemetery.

New York State Assembly
| Preceded by Richard Curran | New York State Assembly; Monroe County, 2nd District; 1893–1898 | Succeeded by Adolph J. Rodenbeck |
| Preceded by Hamilton Fish II | Speaker of the New York State Assembly; 1897–1898 | Succeeded by S. Frederick Nixon |
U.S. House of Representatives
| Preceded by Henry C. Brewster | Member of the U.S. House of Representatives from New York's 31st congressional district 1899–1901 | Succeeded by James B. Perkins |
