= Alfred R. Conkling =

American lawyer (1850-1917)

Alfred Ronalds Conkling (September 28, 1850 – September 18, 1917) was an American geologist, lawyer, writer, and politician from New York.

== Life ==
Conkling was born on September 28, 1850, in New York City, the son of Frederick A. Conkling and Eleonora Ronalds. His brother was Howard Conkling. He was a member of the Seymour-Conkling family.

Conkling attended Mount Washington Collegiate Institute. He then studied mining and metallurgy at the Sheffield Scientific School at Yale University in 1868. He graduated from there in 1870 with a Bachelor of Philosophy. He then attended post-graduate courses at Harvard University, where he studied under Louis Agassiz, Josiah Whitney, Josiah Parsons Cooke, and Nathaniel Shaler.

In 1872, Conkling went abroad and studied geology and mineralogy in the University of Berlin. He was then appointed United States geologist for the Wheeler Survey under George M. Wheeler. He left the federal government in 1879 and began studying law under Erastus C. Benedict. He later graduated from Columbia Law School in 1879. He was appointed Assistant United States District Attorney under Stewart L. Woodword from 1881 to 1882.

Conkling then opened a law office. In the 1884 United States House of Representatives elections, he was the Republican candidate for New York's 7th congressional district. He lost the election, but won the most votes any Republican received until then in the Democratic district. He was a member of the New York City Common Council from 1887 to 1888. In 1891, he was elected to the New York State Assembly as a Republican, representing the New York County 7th District. He served in the Assembly in 1892 and 1895.

In 1896, Conkling married Ethel Eastman Johnson, daughter of painter Eastman Johnson. They had three daughters, Murril R. L., Olga L. G., and Vivian E. H. He was a member of the Episcopal Church. He was a member of the National Municipal League of New York City, the Metropolitan Club, the City Club of New York, and the Country Club of Tuxedo, New York. He published several books, including "Appleton's Guide to Mexico," "Life and Letters of Roscoe Conkling," and "City Government in the United States."

Conkling was separated from his wife Ethel since 1912, and their daughters spent most of their time with her. Upon the deaths of the daughters' uncle and aunt Mr. and Mrs. George Loillard Ronalds, they were to inherit the $750,000 estate, with Conkling appointed its guardian and trustee. His daughters accused him of restricting access to their estate funds, and brought him to court. The accusations and the upcoming trial deeply depressed Conkling, and on September 18, 1917, two days before he was to appear in court, he jumped from his home window on 157 E. 70th St. The day before he died, he executed a new will that left most of his $200,000 estate to his daughters. He was buried in Green-Wood Cemetery in Brooklyn.

New York State Assembly
Preceded by Martin T. McMahon	New York State Assembly; New York County, 7th District; 1892	Succeeded by Otto Kempner
Preceded by Thomas J. O'Donnell	New York State Assembly; New York County, 8th District; 1895	Succeeded by Charles S. Adler
