= 117th New York State Legislature =

New York state legislative session

←	116th	118th	→
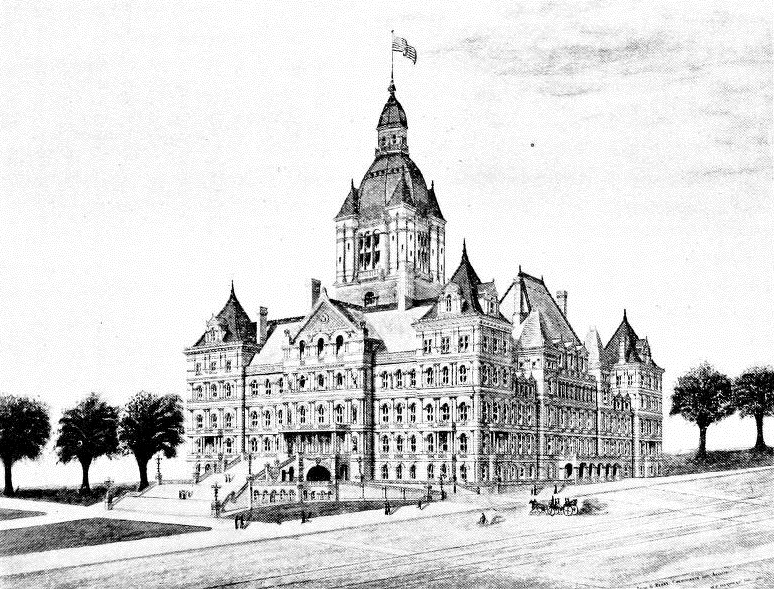
- New York State Capitol (1893)

Overview
- Legislative body: New York State Legislature
- Jurisdiction: New York, United States
- Term: January 1 – December 31, 1894

Senate
- Members: 32
- President: Lt. Gov. William F. Sheehan (D)
- Temporary President: Charles T. Saxton (R)
- Party control: Republican (19-13)

Assembly
- Members: 128
- Speaker: George R. Malby (R)
- Party control: Republican (75-53)

Sessions
- 1st: January 2 – April 27, 1894

The 117th New York State Legislature, consisting of the New York State Senate and the New York State Assembly, met from January 2 to April 27, 1894, during the third year of Roswell P. Flower's governorship, in Albany.

== Background ==
Under the provisions of the New York Constitution of 1846, 32 Senators and 128 assemblymen were elected in single-seat districts; senators for a two-year term, assemblymen for a one-year term. On April 26, 1892, the Legislature re-apportioned the Senate Districts and the number of assemblymen per county. The senatorial districts were made up of entire counties, except New York County (nine districts), Kings County (five districts) and Erie County (two districts). The Assembly districts were made up of entire towns, or city wards, forming a contiguous area, all within the same county.

On January 27, 1893, the Legislature passed "An Act to amend chapter 398, of the Laws of 1892, entitled 'An Act to provide for a convention to revise and amend the Constitution'", calling a Constitutional Convention to meet in 1894.

At this time there were two major political parties: the Democratic Party and the Republican Party. The Prohibition Party, the Socialist Labor Party and a "People's Party" also nominated tickets.

== Elections ==
The 1893 New York state election was held on November 7. All six statewide elective offices up for election were carried by the Republicans. The approximate party strength at this election, as expressed by the vote for Secretary of State, was: Republican 545,000; Democratic 521,000; Prohibition 34,000; Socialist Labor 20,000; and People's Party 17,000.

Also elected were 175 delegates to the Constitutional Convention; five delegates in each senatorial district, and 15 delegates-at-large elected statewide.

This was the only election of State Senators under the apportionment of 1892.

== Sessions ==
The Legislature met for the regular session at the State Capitol in Albany on January 2, 1894; and adjourned on April 27.

George R. Malby (R) was elected Speaker.

Charles T. Saxton (R) was elected president pro tempore of the State Senate.

The Constitutional Convention met at the State Capitol in Albany on May 8; and adjourned on September 29. Joseph H. Choate (R) was elected president; and Thomas G. Alvord (R) First Vice President.

The new Constitution increased the number of state senators from 32 to 50, and the number of assemblymen from 128 to 150; and re-apportioned the Senate districts, and the number of assemblymen per county. Broome, Cattaraugus, Cayuga, Chautauqua, Jefferson, Monroe, Niagara, Oneida, Onondaga, Oswego, St. Lawrence and Suffolk counties gained one seat each; Erie County gained two; Kings County three; and New York County five. The new Constitution also shortened the governor's and lieutenant governor's term to two years; and moved the election of state officers and state senators from odd-numbered to even-numbered years.

The new Constitution was submitted to the voters at the New York state election, 1894, and was adopted.

== State Senate ==
=== Districts ===
- 1st District: Queens and Suffolk counties
- 2nd District: 7th, 9th, 10th, 12th and 22nd Ward of Brooklyn
- 3rd District: 13th, 19th, 21st, 23rd and 25th Ward of Brooklyn
- 4th District: 14th, 15th, 16th, 17th, 18th and 27th Ward of Brooklyn
- 5th District: 1st, 2nd, 3rd, 4th, 5th, 6th, 11th and 20th Ward of Brooklyn
- 6th District: 8th, 24th, 26th and 28th Ward of the City of Brooklyn; all towns in Kings County; and Richmond County
- 7th District: 1st, 2nd, 3rd, 5th, 8th, 9th and 16th Ward of NYC
- 8th District: 4th, 6th, 7th, 11th and 13th Ward of NYC
- 9th District: 10th, 14th, 15th and 17th Ward of New York City
- 10th District: 18th, 20th and 21st Ward of NYC
- 11th District: Southern parts of the 19th and 22nd Ward of NYC
- 12th District: Middle parts of the 19th and 22nd Ward of NYC
- 13th District: Northern parts of the 19th and 22nd; and 23rd Ward of NYC
- 14th District: Northeastern part of the 19th Ward of NYC
- 15th District: 24th Ward of NYC; and Putnam and Westchester counties
- 16th District: Dutchess, Orange and Rockland counties
- 17th District: Greene, Schoharie, Sullivan and Ulster counties
- 18th District: Columbia and Rensselaer counties
- 19th District: Albany County
- 20th District: Herkimer, Montgomery, Saratoga and Schenectady counties
- 21st District: Clinton, Essex, Franklin, Fulton, Hamilton, Warren and Washington counties
- 22nd District: Jefferson, Oswego and St. Lawrence counties
- 23rd District: Lewis, Oneida County and Otsego counties
- 24th District: Madison and Onondaga counties
- 25th District: Broome, Chenango, Cortland, Delaware and Tioga counties
- 26th District: Cayuga, Ontario, Tompkins, Wayne and Yates counties
- 27th District: Chemung, Schuyler, Seneca and Steuben counties
- 28th District: Monroe County
- 29th District: Genesee, Livingston, Niagara, Orleans and Wyoming counties
- 30th District: 1st, 2nd, 3rd, 4th, 5th, 6th, 7th, 8th, 9th, 10th, 11th, 12th, 13th, 14th, 19th and 20th Ward of the City of Buffalo
- 31st District: 15th, 16th, 17th, 18th, 21st, 22nd, 23rd, 24th and 25th Ward of Buffalo; and the remaining area of Erie County
- 32nd District: Allegany, Cattaraugus and Chautauqua counties

Note: There are now 62 counties in the State of New York. The counties which are not mentioned in this list had not yet been established, or sufficiently organized, the area being included in one or more of the abovementioned counties.

=== Members ===
The asterisk (*) denotes members of the previous Legislature who continued in office as members of this Legislature. Timothy D. Sullivan, Frank A. O'Donnel, Joseph C. Wolff, Thomas C. O'Sullivan and Jacob Rice changed from the Assembly to the Senate.

District	Senator	Party	Notes
1st	John Lewis Childs	Republican	
2nd	Michael J. Coffey	Democrat	unsuccessfully contested by William H. Quinn (R)
3rd	William H. Reynolds	Republican	
4th	George A. Owens	Republican	
5th	Daniel Bradley	Ind. Dem.	
6th	John McCarty*	Democrat	re-elected; contested; seat vacated
6th	Henry Wolfert	Republican	seated in February
7th	Martin T. McMahon*	Democrat	re-elected
8th	John F. Ahearn*	Democrat	re-elected
9th	Timothy D. Sullivan*	Democrat	
10th	Frank A. O'Donnel*	Democrat	
11th	Joseph C. Wolff*	Democrat	
12th	Thomas C. O'Sullivan*	Democrat	
13th	Charles L. Guy	Democrat	
14th	Jacob A. Cantor*	Democrat	re-elected; Minority Leader
15th	George W. Robertson	Republican	
16th	Clarence Lexow	Republican	
17th	Jacob Rice*	Democrat	
18th	Michael F. Collins	Democrat	unsuccessfully contested by Sheppard Tappan (R)
19th	Amasa J. Parker Jr.*	Democrat	re-elected
20th	Harvey J. Donaldson*	Republican	re-elected
21st	Frederick D. Kilburn	Republican	
22nd	Joseph Mullin*	Republican	re-elected
23rd	Henry J. Coggeshall*	Republican	re-elected
24th	Charles W. Stapleton	Republican	
25th	Edmund O'Connor*	Republican	re-elected
26th	Charles T. Saxton*	Republican	re-elected; elected president pro tempore; on November 6, 1894, elected Lieutenant Governor of New York
27th	Baxter T. Smelzer	Republican	
28th	Cornelius R. Parsons*	Republican	re-elected
29th	Cuthbert W. Pound	Republican	
30th	Charles Lamy	Republican	
31st	Henry H. Persons	Republican	
32nd	Frank W. Higgins	Republican	

=== Employees ===
- Clerk: John S. Kenyon
- Sergeant-at-Arms: Charles V. Schram
- Doorkeeper: Edward Dowling
- Stenographer: Lucius A. Waldo

== State Assembly ==
=== Assemblymen ===
The asterisk (*) denotes members of the previous Legislature who continued as members of this Legislature.

Note: For brevity, the chairmanships omit the words "...the Committee on (the)..."

District		Assemblymen	Party	Notes
Albany	1st	William Lasch	Democrat	unsuccessfully contested by Frank Bloomingdale (R)
Albany	2nd	William A. Carroll	Democrat	
Albany	3rd	James Brennan	Democrat	
Albany	4th	Curtis N. Douglas	Democrat	unsuccessfully contested by Amos J. Ablett (R)
Allegany		Fred A. Robbins	Republican	
Broome		Joseph H. Brownell	Republican	
Cattaraugus		Charles W. Terry	Republican	Chairman of Indian Affairs
Cayuga		Benjamin M. Wilcox	Republican	
Chautauqua		S. Frederick Nixon	Republican	Chairman of Public Institutions
Chemung		Robert P. Bush	Democrat	
Chenango		David Sherwood	Republican	
Clinton		Everett C. Baker	Republican	Chairman of Prisons
Columbia		Jacob H. Hoysradt	Democrat	
Cortland		Benjamin F. Lee	Republican	
Delaware		Wesley Gould	Republican	Chairman of Military Affairs
Dutchess	1st	Edward H. Thompson*	Republican	Chairman of Banks
Dutchess	2nd	Augustus B. Gray	Republican	Chairman of Federal Relations
Erie	1st	Cornelius Coughlin	Democrat	unsuccessfully contested by Jules O'Brien (R)
Erie	2nd	Simon Seibert	Republican	
Erie	3rd	Charles Braun	Republican	Chairman of Printed and Engrossed Bills
Erie	4th	Joseph L. Whittet	Republican	
Erie	5th	Philip Gerst	Republican	Chairman of Canals
Erie	6th	Charles F. Schoepflin	Republican	Chairman of Public Printing
Essex		George A. Stevens*	Republican	Chairman of Public Lands and Forestry
Franklin		Allen S. Matthews*	Republican	Chairman of Taxation and Retrenchment
Fulton and Hamilton		Philip Keck*	Republican	Chairman of General Laws
Genesee		Thomas B. Tuttle	Republican	
Greene		Ira B. Kerr	Democrat	
Herkimer		William C. Prescott*	Republican	Chairman of Codes
Jefferson		Harrison Fuller*	Republican	Chairman of Trades and Manufactures
Kings	1st	William J. Plant*	Democrat	unsuccessfully contested by William Dwyer (R)
Kings	2nd	John A. Hennessey*	Democrat	
Kings	3rd	John F. Houghton	Republican	
Kings	4th	Joseph J. Cahill*	Democrat	
Kings	5th	John H. Burtis	Republican	Chairman of Charitable and Religious Societies
Kings	6th	Michael E. Finnigan*	Democrat	
Kings	7th	William Hughes	Democrat	contested; seat vacated on April 4
Kings	7th	Stillman F. Kneeland	Republican	seated on April 4
Kings	8th	John J. Cain	Democrat	
Kings	9th	William E. Melody*	Democrat	unsuccessfully contested by George R. Pasfield (R)
Kings	10th	Frank F. Schulz	Republican	Chairman of Unfinished Business
Kings	11th	Harry Schulz	Republican	
Kings	12th	Joseph F. Loonan	Democrat	unsuccessfully contested by Thomas W. Campbell (R)
Kings	13th	Francis E. Clark	Republican	
Kings	14th	James Taylor	Republican	Chairman of Public Health
Kings	15th	Albert A. Wray	Republican	
Kings	16th	James Graham*	Democrat	contested; seat vacated on February 21
Kings	16th	William H. Friday	Republican	seated on February 21
Kings	17th	James Scanlon	Republican	
Kings	18th	Julius L. Wieman	Republican	
Lewis		Melville W. Van Amber	Republican	Chairman of Fisheries and Game
Livingston		Otto Kelsey	Republican	
Madison		Lambert B. Kern	Republican	
Monroe	1st	Samuel H. Stone*	Republican	Chairman of Claims
Monroe	2nd	James M. E. O'Grady*	Republican	Chairman of Public Education
Monroe	3rd	William H. Denniston*	Republican	Chairman of Excise
Montgomery		E. Watson Gardiner	Republican	
New York	1st	John H. G. Vehslage	Democrat	
New York	2nd	Michael J. Callahan	Democrat	
New York	3rd	Jacob A. Mittnacht*	Democrat	
New York	4th	Patrick H. Roche*	Democrat	
New York	5th	Samuel J. Foley*	Democrat	unsuccessfully contested by Albert W. Baillie (R)
New York	6th	Moses Dinkelspiel*	Democrat	
New York	7th	John C. Stein	Democrat	
New York	8th	Thomas J. O'Donnell	Democrat	unsuccessfully contested by Charles La Maida (R)
New York	9th	John F. McDermott	Democrat	
New York	10th	William Sulzer*	Democrat	Minority Leader; on November 6, 1894, elected to the 54th U.S. Congress
New York	11th	James R. Sheffield	Republican	
New York	12th	Edward B. La Fetra	Democrat	
New York	13th	James H. Southworth*	Democrat	
New York	14th	John P. Corrigan	Democrat	
New York	15th	Adolph Schillinger	Democrat	unsuccessfully contested by Seth Wilks (R)
New York	16th	Victor J. Dowling	Democrat	
New York	17th	Patrick F. Trainor	Democrat	unsuccessfully contested by Robert Miller (R)
New York	18th	Daniel J. Gleason	Democrat	
New York	19th	Patrick J. Kerrigan	Democrat	unsuccessfully contested by Edward R. Duffy (R)
New York	20th	William H. McKeon*	Democrat	
New York	21st	Moses Herrman	Democrat	
New York	22nd	Michael F. Tobin	Democrat	unsuccessfully contested by Henry B. Page (R)
New York	23rd	Judson Lawson	Republican	
New York	24th	Robert V. Stadtfeld	Democrat	
New York	25th	John Keleher*	Democrat	
New York	26th	Louis Davidson*	Democrat	
New York	27th	Thomas H. Robertson	Republican	
New York	28th	James F. Reilly*	Democrat	
New York	29th	Arthur C. Butts*	Democrat	
New York	30th	Charles C. Marrin*	Democrat	
Niagara		John H. Clark	Republican	
Oneida	1st	Henry P. Hoefler	Republican	
Oneida	2nd	Joseph Porter	Republican	Chairman of Soldiers' Home
Onondaga	1st	J. Emmett Wells	Republican	
Onondaga	2nd	Jonathan Wyckoff*	Republican	Chairman of Agriculture
Onondaga	3rd	William H. Hotaling*	Republican	Chairman of Labor and Industries
Ontario		William L. Parkhurst*	Republican	Chairman of Railroads
Orange	1st	Howard Thornton*	Republican	Chairman of Judiciary
Orange	2nd	Joseph Dean	Republican	
Orleans		Samuel W. Smith	Republican	
Oswego		Danforth E. Ainsworth*	Republican	Majority Leader; Chairman of Ways and Means
Otsego		John J. Rider	Republican	
Putnam		Hamilton Fish II*	Republican	Chairman of Affairs of Cities
Queens	1st	James Robinson*	Democrat	
Queens	2nd	James S. Fairbrother	Republican	
Queens	3rd	Eugene F. Vacheron	Republican	
Rensselaer	1st	William M. Keenan*	Democrat	
Rensselaer	2nd	John M. Chambers*	Republican	Chairman of Affairs of Villages
Rensselaer	3rd	John J. Cassin*	Democrat	
Richmond		Michael McGuire	Democrat	contested; seat vacated on April 4
Richmond		Michael Conklin	Republican	seated on April 4
Rockland		Otis H. Cutler	Republican	
St. Lawrence		George R. Malby*	Republican	elected Speaker; Chairman of Rules
Saratoga		James Frank Terry*	Republican	Chairman of Revision
Schenectady		John C. Myers	Democrat	
Schoharie		Charles Chapman	Democrat	
Schuyler		George A. Snyder	Republican	
Seneca		Harry M. Glen	Republican	
Steuben	1st	Willoughby W. Babcock	Republican	
Steuben	2nd	Merritt F. Smith	Republican	
Suffolk		Richard Higbie*	Republican	Chairman of Commerce and Navigation
Sullivan		Uriah S. Messiter*	Republican	Chairman of Internal Affairs
Tioga		Epenetus Howe	Republican	
Tompkins		Edwin C. Stewart	Republican	
Ulster	1st	Henry McNamee	Democrat	
Ulster	2nd	James Lounsbery*	Republican	Chairman of Electricity, Gas and Water Supply
Warren		Taylor J. Eldredge	Republican	
Washington		William R. Hobbie*	Republican	Chairman of Insurance
Wayne		George S. Horton	Republican	Chairman of Privileges and Elections
Westchester	1st	John C. Harrigan	Democrat	
Westchester	2nd	John Berry	Democrat	
Westchester	3rd	Edgar L. Ryder*	Democrat	
Wyoming		Reuben J. Tilton	Republican	
Yates		A. Flagg Robson	Republican	

=== Employees ===
- Clerk: George W. Dunn
- Assistant Clerk: Haines D. Cunningham
- Financial Clerk: William C. Stevens
- Sergeant-at-Arms: James H. Manville
- Doorkeeper: Joseph Bauer
- Stenographer: Henry F. Gilson

== Sources ==
- New York State Legislative Souvenir for 1894 with Portraits of the Members of Both Houses by Henry P. Phelps
- The New York Red Book compiled by Edgar L. Murlin (published by James B. Lyon, Albany NY, 1897; see pg. 385 for senate districts; pg. 404 for senators; pg. 410–417 for Assembly districts; and pg. 510f for assemblymen)
- LEGISLATURE REPUBLICAN in NYT on November 9, 1893
- THE LEGISLATURE AT WORK in NYT on January 3, 1894
- FINAL PROTEST BY SHEEHAN in NYT on February 7, 1894
- THE WORK OF M'KANE UNDONE in NYT on February 22, 1894
- McGUIRE AND HUGHES MUST GO in NYT on April 4, 1894
- LEGISLATURE'S WORK IS DONE and RECORD OF THE LEGISLATURE in NYT on April 28, 1894
