= William H. Kinne =

American politician

William Halsey Kinne (April 22, 1846 – March 16, 1943) was an American merchant and politician from New York.

== Life ==
Kinne was born on April 22, 1846, in Romulus, New York. His parents, Mr. and Mrs. Silas Kinne, were pioneer settlers of south Seneca County.

Kinne attended Ovid Academy. He then moved to Ovid and worked as a coal and lumber dealer. He was a member of the Kinne Bros. firm, dealers of lumber, coal, builders' supplies, and farm machinery.

In 1891, Kinne was elected to the New York State Assembly as a Democrat, representing Seneca County. He served in the Assembly in 1892 and 1896. In 1913, he was appointed postmaster for the village of Ovid.

Kinne was married to Elnora Blaine. Their children were Mrs. John G. Gordon, Mrs. S. E. Mekell, Charles, and James B. For the last several years of his life, he lived with his son Charles in Waterloo.

Kinne died on March 16, 1943, at his son Charles' home in Waterloo. He was buried in the Ovid Union Cemetery.

New York State Assembly
Preceded by William H. Dunham	New York State Assembly; Seneca County; 1892	Succeeded by Henry Van De Mark
Preceded by Harry M. Glen	New York State Assembly; Seneca County; 1896	Succeeded by Harry M. Glen
