= Arthur J. Audett =

American politician

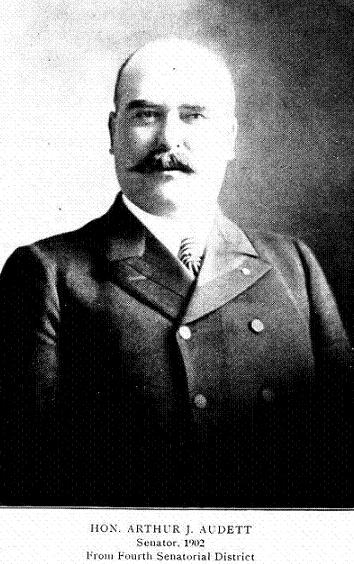

Member of the New York Senate from the 4th district
- In office 1901–1902
- Preceded by: David Floyd Davis
- Succeeded by: Thomas C. Whitlock

Arthur J. Audett (April 11, 1858 – April 23, 1921) was an American politician from New York.

== Life ==
Audett was born in Hamilton, Canada West. He emigrated to the United States in 1876, and settled in Brooklyn in 1884. He was a lithographic transferrer.

Audett was a member of the New York State Assembly in 1895 (Kings Co., 13th D.) and 1896 (Kings Co., 6th D.).

He was a member of the New York State Senate (4th D.) in 1901 and 1902.

He died suddenly on March 23, 1921, at the Adelphia Hotel in Philadelphia, of heart disease.

== Sources ==
- Official New York from Cleveland to Hughes by Charles Elliott Fitch (Hurd Publishing Co., New York and Buffalo, 1911, Vol. IV; pg. 334f and 365)
- Sketches of the members of the Legislature in The Evening Journal Almanac (1895; pg. 56)
- Ex-Senator Audett Dies Suddenly in NYT on April 24, 1921

New York State Assembly
Preceded by Francis E. Clark	New York State Assembly; Kings County, 13th District; 1895	Succeeded by Orrion L. Forrester
Preceded by Edward M. Clarkson	New York State Assembly; Kings County, 6th District; 1896	Succeeded by Edward H. M. Roehr
New York State Senate
Preceded by David Floyd Davis	New York State Senate; 4th District; 1901–1902	Succeeded by Thomas C. Whitlock
