= Bernard F. Martin =

American politician (1845–1914)

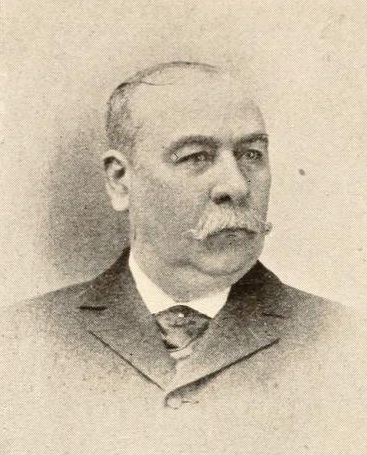
- Martin in 1902

Coroner of New York County
- In office 1883–1885

Personal details
- Born: February 4, 1845} County Longford, Ireland
- Died: August 10, 1914 (aged 69) Atlantic Highlands, New Jersey, U.S.

Military service
- Battles/wars: American Civil War

Bernard F. Martin (February 4, 1845 – August 10, 1914) was an American politician from Manhattan, New York City.

== Early years ==
He was born on February 4, 1845, County Longford, Ireland. The family emigrated to the United States when Bernard was four years old, in 1849. He attended the old Orange Street School and St. Francis Xavier's College. Then he became a delivery clerk. He fought for three months in the American Civil War with the 37th New York Volunteers. Returning home, he became a street car conductor, and later a driver for the New York News Company.

== Career ==
He joined Tammany Hall at the time of John Kelly's leadership, and became a clerk in the office of the Board of Health. In 1882, he kept a saloon for a short time, and later engaged in the real estate business.

He was an Alderman of New York City in 1882; a Coroner of New York County from 1883 to 1885; a deputy Sheriff of New York County; Deputy Commissioner of Public Works of New York City from 1890 to 1891; Commissioner of Jurors in 1892; and a Police Justice from 1893 to 1895.

Martin was a member of the New York State Senate (13th D.) from 1896 to 1906, sitting in the 119th, 120th, 121st, 122nd, 123rd, 124th, 125th, 126th, 127th, 128th and 129th New York State Legislatures.

== Death ==
He died on August 10, 1914, at his summer home in Atlantic Highlands, New Jersey, of "heart disease brought on by indigestion".

== Sources ==
New York State Senate
Preceded by Charles L. Guy	New York State Senate; 13th District; 1896–1906	Succeeded by Christopher D. Sullivan
