= 118th New York State Legislature =

New York state legislative session

←	117th	119th	→
- New York State Capitol (2009)

Overview
- Legislative body: New York State Legislature
- Jurisdiction: New York, United States
- Term: January 1 – December 31, 1895

Senate
- Members: 32
- President: Lt. Gov. Charles T. Saxton (R)
- Temporary President: Edmund O'Connor (R)
- Party control: Republican (19-13)

Assembly
- Members: 128
- Speaker: Hamilton Fish II (R)
- Party control: Republican (105-23)

Sessions
- 1st: January 2 – May 16, 1895

The 118th New York State Legislature, consisting of the New York State Senate and the New York State Assembly, met from January 2 to May 16, 1895, during the first year of Levi P. Morton's governorship, in Albany.

== Background ==
Under the provisions of the New York Constitution of 1846, 32 Senators and 128 assemblymen were elected in single-seat districts; senators for a two-year term, assemblymen for a one-year term. The senatorial districts were made up of entire counties, except New York County (nine districts), Kings County (five districts) and Erie County (two districts). The Assembly districts were made up of entire towns, or city wards, forming a contiguous area, all within the same county.

A Constitutional Convention met at the State Capitol in Albany from May 8 to September 29, 1894. The new Constitution was submitted to the electorate for ratification at the state election on November 6.

At this time there were two major political parties: the Republican Party and the Democratic Party. Two Democratic anti-machine factions (the "Democratic Reform Organization" in Brooklyn, and the "Empire State Democracy" in New York City), the Prohibition Party, the Socialist Labor Party and the People's Party also nominated tickets.

== Elections ==
The 1894 New York state election was held on November 6.

Ex-U.S. Vice President Levi P. Morton was elected Governor; and President pro tempore of the State Senate Charles T. Saxton was elected Lieutenant Governor (both Rep.). The only other statewide elective offices up for election was also carried by a Republican. The approximate party strength at this election, as expressed by the vote for Governor, was: Republican 674,000; Democratic/Empire State 518,000; Democratic Reform 27,000; Prohibition 24,000; Socialist Labor 16,000; and People's Party 11,000.

Besides, the new Constitution was adopted by the voters, and took effect on January 1, 1895. The new Constitution moved the day for the first meeting of the Legislature from the first Tuesday in January to the first Wednesday, and the 118th Legislature convened on Wednesday, January 2, 1895.

== Sessions ==
The Legislature met for the regular session at the State Capitol in Albany on January 2, 1895; and adjourned on May 16.

Hamilton Fish II (Rep.) was elected Speaker against Samuel J. Foley (Dem.).

Edmund O'Connor (Rep.) was elected president pro tempore of the State Senate.

On February 13, the Legislature elected Charles R. Skinner (Rep.) as Superintendent of Public Instruction, to succeed James F. Crooker for a term of three years.

On May 14, Assemblyman Eugene F. Vacheron was indicted for asking for a bribe (a misdemeanor), and for accepting a bribe (a felony). He was accused of having received $3,000 to kill the "Hudson River Ice Bill" in the Assembly Committee on Internal Affairs. After many postponements the case was tried in December 1896 and Vacheron was acquitted.

== State Senate ==
=== Districts ===
- 1st District: Queens and Suffolk counties
- 2nd District: 7th, 9th, 10th, 12th and 22nd Ward of Brooklyn
- 3rd District: 13th, 19th, 21st, 23rd and 25th Ward of Brooklyn
- 4th District: 14th, 15th, 16th, 17th, 18th and 27th Ward of Brooklyn
- 5th District: 1st, 2nd, 3rd, 4th, 5th, 6th, 11th and 20th Ward of Brooklyn
- 6th District: 8th, 24th, 26th and 28th Ward of the City of Brooklyn; all towns in Kings County; and Richmond County
- 7th District: 1st, 2nd, 3rd, 5th, 8th, 9th and 16th Ward of NYC
- 8th District: 4th, 6th, 7th, 11th and 13th Ward of NYC
- 9th District: 10th, 14th, 15th and 17th Ward of New York City
- 10th District: 18th, 20th and 21st Ward of NYC
- 11th District: Southern parts of the 19th and 22nd Ward of NYC
- 12th District: Middle parts of the 19th and 22nd Ward of NYC
- 13th District: Northern parts of the 19th and 22nd; and 23rd Ward of NYC
- 14th District: Northeastern part of the 19th Ward of NYC
- 15th District: 24th Ward of NYC; and Putnam and Westchester counties
- 16th District: Dutchess, Orange and Rockland counties
- 17th District: Greene, Schoharie, Sullivan and Ulster counties
- 18th District: Columbia and Rensselaer counties
- 19th District: Albany County
- 20th District: Herkimer, Montgomery, Saratoga and Schenectady counties
- 21st District: Clinton, Essex, Franklin, Fulton, Hamilton, Warren and Washington counties
- 22nd District: Jefferson, Oswego and St. Lawrence counties
- 23rd District: Lewis, Oneida County and Otsego counties
- 24th District: Madison and Onondaga counties
- 25th District: Broome, Chenango, Cortland, Delaware and Tioga counties
- 26th District: Cayuga, Ontario, Tompkins, Wayne and Yates counties
- 27th District: Chemung, Schuyler, Seneca and Steuben counties
- 28th District: Monroe County
- 29th District: Genesee, Livingston, Niagara, Orleans and Wyoming counties
- 30th District: 1st, 2nd, 3rd, 4th, 5th, 6th, 7th, 8th, 9th, 10th, 11th, 12th, 13th, 14th, 19th and 20th Ward of the City of Buffalo
- 31st District: 15th, 16th, 17th, 18th, 21st, 22nd, 23rd, 24th and 25th Ward of Buffalo; and the remaining area of Erie County
- 32nd District: Allegany, Cattaraugus and Chautauqua counties

Note: There are now 62 counties in the State of New York. The counties which are not mentioned in this list had not yet been established, or sufficiently organized, the area being included in one or more of the abovementioned counties.

=== Members ===
The asterisk (*) denotes members of the previous Legislature who continued in office as members of this Legislature.

District	Senator	Party	Notes
1st	John Lewis Childs*	Republican	
2nd	Michael J. Coffey*	Democrat	
3rd	William H. Reynolds*	Republican	
4th	George A. Owens*	Republican	
5th	Daniel Bradley*	Ind. Dem.	
6th	Henry Wolfert*	Republican	
7th	Martin T. McMahon*	Democrat	
8th	John F. Ahearn*	Democrat	
9th	Timothy D. Sullivan*	Democrat	
10th	Frank A. O'Donnel*	Democrat	
11th	Joseph C. Wolff*	Democrat	
12th	Thomas C. O'Sullivan*	Democrat	
13th	Charles L. Guy*	Democrat	
14th	Jacob A. Cantor*	Democrat	Minority Leader
15th	George W. Robertson*	Republican	
16th	Clarence Lexow*	Republican	
17th	Jacob Rice*	Democrat	
18th	Michael F. Collins*	Democrat	
19th	Amasa J. Parker Jr.*	Democrat	
20th	Harvey J. Donaldson*	Republican	
21st	Frederick D. Kilburn*	Republican	
22nd	Joseph Mullin*	Republican	
23rd	Henry J. Coggeshall*	Republican	
24th	Charles W. Stapleton*	Republican	
25th	Edmund O'Connor*	Republican	elected President pro tempore
26th	John Raines	Republican	elected to fill vacancy, in place of Charles T. Saxton
27th	Baxter T. Smelzer*	Republican	
28th	Cornelius R. Parsons*	Republican	
29th	Cuthbert W. Pound*	Republican	
30th	Charles Lamy*	Republican	
31st	Henry H. Persons*	Republican	
32nd	Frank W. Higgins*	Republican	

=== Employees ===
- Clerk: John S. Kenyon
- Assistant Clerk: Charles A. Ball
- Sergeant-at-Arms: Charles V. Schram
- Doorkeeper: Edward Dowling
- Stenographer: Lucius A. Waldo
- Journal Clerk: Lafayette B. Gleason
- Postmaster: Stephen C. Green

== State Assembly ==
=== Assemblymen ===
The asterisk (*) denotes members of the previous Legislature who continued as members of this Legislature.

District		Assemblymen	Party	Notes
Albany	1st	Frank Bloomingdale	Republican	
Albany	2nd	James Keenholts	Republican	
Albany	3rd	Jacob L. Ten Eyck	Democrat	
Albany	4th	Amos J. Ablett	Republican	
Allegany		Fred A. Robbins*	Republican	
Broome		Joseph H. Brownell*	Republican	
Cattaraugus		Charles W. Terry*	Republican	
Cayuga		Benjamin M. Wilcox*	Republican	
Chautauqua		S. Frederick Nixon*	Republican	
Chemung		John B. Stanchfield	Democrat	
Chenango		David Sherwood*	Republican	
Clinton		Willis T. Honsinger	Republican	
Columbia		Aaron B. Gardenier	Republican	
Cortland		Wilber Holmes	Republican	
Delaware		Robert Cartwright	Republican	
Dutchess	1st	Edward H. Thompson*	Republican	
Dutchess	2nd	Augustus B. Gray*	Republican	
Erie	1st	Cornelius Coughlin*	Democrat	
Erie	2nd	Simon Seibert*	Republican	
Erie	3rd	Charles Braun*	Republican	
Erie	4th	Joseph L. Whittet*	Republican	
Erie	5th	Philip Gerst*	Republican	
Erie	6th	Charles F. Schoepflin*	Republican	
Essex		Albert Weed	Republican	
Franklin		Thomas A. Sears	Republican	
Fulton and Hamilton		Philip Keck*	Republican	
Genesee		Thomas B. Tuttle*	Republican	
Greene		Daniel G. Greene	Republican	
Herkimer		E. LaGrange Smith	Republican	
Jefferson		Harrison Fuller*	Republican	
Kings	1st	John McKeown	Democrat	
Kings	2nd	John A. Hennessey*	Democrat	
Kings	3rd	John F. Houghton*	Republican	
Kings	4th	Frank Gallagher	Democrat	
Kings	5th	John H. Read	Republican	
Kings	6th	Edward M. Clarkson	Republican	
Kings	7th	George W. Brush	Republican	
Kings	8th	John J. Cain*	Democrat	
Kings	9th	Thomas H. Rockwell	Republican	
Kings	10th	Frank F. Schulz*	Republican	
Kings	11th	Harry Schulz*	Republican	
Kings	12th	John H. Campbell	Republican	
Kings	13th	Arthur J. Audett	Republican	
Kings	14th	Henry E. Abell	Republican	
Kings	15th	Albert A. Wray*	Republican	
Kings	16th	William H. Friday*	Republican	
Kings	17th	James Scanlon*	Republican	
Kings	18th	Julius L. Wieman*	Republican	
Lewis		Melville W. Van Amber*	Republican	
Livingston		Otto Kelsey*	Republican	
Madison		Lambert B. Kern*	Republican	
Monroe	1st	Charles J. Smith	Republican	
Monroe	2nd	James M. E. O'Grady*	Republican	
Monroe	3rd	William W. Armstrong	Republican	
Montgomery		E. Watson Gardiner*	Republican	
New York	1st	Daniel E. Finn	Democrat	
New York	2nd	Thomas J. Barry	Democrat	
New York	3rd	Charles S. Adler	Republican	
New York	4th	James A. Donnelly	Democrat	
New York	5th	Samuel J. Foley*	Democrat	Minority Leader
New York	6th	Benjamin Hoffman	Democrat	
New York	7th	Henry William Hoops Jr.	Republican	
New York	8th	Alfred R. Conkling	Republican	
New York	9th	John F. McDermott*	Democrat	
New York	10th	Jacob Kunzenman	Democrat	
New York	11th	Frank D. Pavey	Republican	
New York	12th	Edward B. La Fetra*	Democrat	
New York	13th	William Halpin	Republican	
New York	14th	John P. Corrigan*	Democrat	
New York	15th	Seth Wilks	Republican	
New York	16th	Charles Steinberg	Republican	
New York	17th	Robert Miller	Republican	
New York	18th	Daniel J. Gleason*	Democrat	
New York	19th	Welton C. Percy	Republican	
New York	20th	John B. Fitzgerald	Democrat	
New York	21st	Howard Payson Wilds	Republican	
New York	22nd	Michael F. Tobin*	Democrat	
New York	23rd	Judson Lawson*	Republican	
New York	24th	Louis H. Bold	Republican	
New York	25th	Stephen S. Blake	Democrat	
New York	26th	Harvey T. Andrews	Republican	
New York	27th	Philip W. Reinhard Jr.	Republican	
New York	28th	George W. Hamilton	Republican	
New York	29th	Alonzo Bell	Republican	
New York	30th	William White Niles	Republican	
Niagara		John H. Clark*	Republican	
Oneida	1st	Henry P. Hoefler*	Republican	
Oneida	2nd	William Cary Sanger	Republican	
Onondaga	1st	Charles R. Rogers	Republican	
Onondaga	2nd	Charles C. Cole	Republican	
Onondaga	3rd	Levi S. Chapman	Republican	
Ontario		Walter A. Clark	Republican	
Orange	1st	Louis F. Goodsell	Republican	
Orange	2nd	Joseph Dean*	Republican	
Orleans		George Bullard	Republican	
Oswego		Danforth E. Ainsworth*	Republican	Majority Floor Leader
Otsego		John J. Rider*	Republican	
Putnam		Hamilton Fish II*	Republican	elected Speaker
Queens	1st	John P. Madden	Democrat	
Queens	2nd	James S. Fairbrother*	Republican	
Queens	3rd	Eugene F. Vacheron*	Republican	
Rensselaer	1st	John T. Norton	Democrat	
Rensselaer	2nd	John M. Chambers*	Republican	
Rensselaer	3rd	John P. Cole	Republican	
Richmond		Michael Conklin*	Republican	
Rockland		Otis H. Cutler*	Republican	
St. Lawrence		George R. Malby*	Republican	
Saratoga		Charles H. McNaughton	Republican	
Schenectady		Thomas W. Winne	Republican	
Schoharie		Henry J. Staley	Democrat	
Schuyler		George A. Snyder*	Republican	
Seneca		Harry M. Glen*	Republican	
Steuben	1st	Willoughby W. Babcock*	Republican	
Steuben	2nd	Merritt F. Smith*	Republican	
Suffolk		Richard Higbie*	Republican	
Sullivan		Henry Krenrich	Republican	
Tioga		Epenetus Howe*	Republican	
Tompkins		Edwin C. Stewart*	Republican	
Ulster	1st	William S. Van Keuren	Republican	
Ulster	2nd	James Lounsbery*	Republican	
Warren		Taylor J. Eldredge*	Republican	
Washington		William D. Stevenson	Republican	
Wayne		George S. Horton*	Republican	
Westchester	1st	J. Irving Burns	Republican	
Westchester	2nd	John N. Stewart	Republican	
Westchester	3rd	James W. Husted	Republican	
Wyoming		Reuben J. Tilton*	Republican	
Yates		Everett Brown	Republican	

=== Employees ===
- Clerk: Archie E. Baxter
- Assistant Clerk: Haines D. Cunningham
- Financial Clerk: William C. Stevens
- Sergeant-at-Arms: Garret J. Benson
- Doorkeeper: Joseph Bauer
- Stenographer: Robert C. Chapin
- Journal Clerk: Edward M. Johnson

== Sources ==
- The New York Red Book compiled by Edgar L. Murlin (published by James B. Lyon, Albany NY, 1897; see pg. 385 for senate districts; pg. 404 for senators; pg. 410–417 for Assembly districts; and pg. 511f for assemblymen)
- Sketches of the members of the Legislature in The Evening Journal Almanac (1895; pg. 48–64)
- HAMILTON FISH SPEAKER in NYT on January 2, 1895
- NEW STATE LEGISLATURE in NYT on January 3, 1895
