= Henry Marshall (New York politician) =

American politician

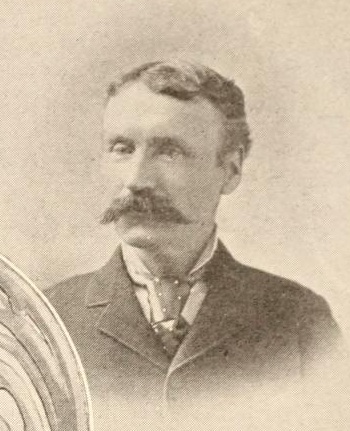
Henry Marshall (1902)

Henry Marshall (January 25, 1847 – September 24, 1938) was an American lawyer and politician from New York.

== Life ==
He was born on January 25, 1847, in Washington County, New York, the son of Robert Marshall and Margaret (Law) Marshall. He attended the common schools and Cambridge Washington Academy. Then he entered politics, was a civil justice, and wrote editorials for the Seneca Falls Courier, and the Saratoga Daily Journal. He graduated from Albany Law School in 1882, was admitted to the bar, and practiced in New York City, but resided in Brooklyn.

Marshall was a member of the New York State Assembly (Kings Co., 17th D.) in 1896, 1897 and 1898.

He was a member of the New York State Senate (8th D.) from 1899 to 1904, sitting in the 122nd, 123rd, 124th, 125th, 126th and 127th New York State Legislatures.

He died on September 24, 1938, in Mary McClellan Hospital in Cambridge, New York, after an illness of two months.

Financier George Law (1806–1881) was his uncle.

== Sources ==
- The New York Red Book compiled by Edgar L. Murlin (published by James B. Lyon, Albany NY, 1897; pg. 236 and 512f)
- HENRY MARSHALL; Ex-State Senator and Retired Lawyer of This City in NYT on September 26, 1938 (subscription required)

New York State Assembly
Preceded by James Scanlon	New York State Assembly; Kings County, 17th District; 1896–1898	Succeeded by Harris Wilson
New York State Senate
Preceded by Albert A. Wray	New York State Senate; 8th District; 1899–1904	Succeeded by Charles Cooper
