= Henry J. Coggeshall =

American politician

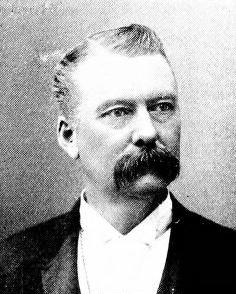
Coggeshall c. 1893

Henry James Coggeshall (April 28, 1845 Waterville, Oneida County, New York – July 14, 1907 Waterville, Oneida Co., NY) was an American lawyer and politician from New York.

He graduated from Waterville Seminary in 1862. He then studied law, was admitted to the bar in 1866, and practiced in Waterville.

He was Assistant District Attorney of Oneida County from 1869 to 1872; an alternate delegate to the 1872 Republican National Convention; a member of the New York State Assembly (Oneida Co., 2nd D.) in 1873; and Clerk of Oneida County from 1879 to 1882.

He was a member of the New York State Senate from 1884 to 1900, sitting in the 107th, 108th, 109th, 110th, 111th, 112th, 113th, 114th, 115th, 116th (all 22nd D.), 117th, 118th (both 23rd D.), 119th, 120th, 121st, 122nd and 123rd New York State Legislatures (all 34th D.). In 1895, he lost the Republican nomination, and ran as an Independent Republican, defeating the regular Republican candidate.

He was again a member of the State Senate (34th D.) in 1905 and 1906.

== Sources ==
- The New York Red Book compiled by Edgar L. Murlin (published by James B. Lyon, Albany NY, 1897; pg. 403f and 495)
- Life Sketches of Executive Officers and Members of the Legislature of the State of New York by William H. McElroy & Alexander McBride (1873; pg. 173f)
- Biographical sketches of the Members of the Legislature in The Evening Journal Almanac (1885)
- HENRY J. COGGESHALL DEAD in NYT on July 15, 1907

New York State Assembly
Preceded by Eleazer Beckwith	New York State Assembly; Oneida County, 2nd District; 1873	Succeeded by Arthur F. Brown
New York State Senate
Preceded by Robert H. Roberts	New York State Senate; 22nd District; 1884–1893	Succeeded by Joseph Mullin
Preceded by John E. Smith	New York State Senate; 23rd District; 1894–1895	Succeeded by Clarence Lexow
Preceded by new district	New York State Senate; 34th District; 1896–1900	Succeeded by Garry A. Willard
Preceded by William Townsend	New York State Senate; 34th District; 1905–1906	Succeeded by William T. O'Neil
