= Peter H. McNulty =

American politician and businessman

Peter H. McNulty (1818-1902), a merchant and real estate operator and, concurrently, an officer from 1880 (3rd Battalion) and a major from 1889 (Quartermaster, 2nd Brigade) in the New York National Guard, was a multi term turn of the 19th century Democratic Party (USA) New York State Senator from Brooklyn's 6th District (119th New York State Legislature, 120th New York State Legislature and 121st New York State Legislature). McNulty apparently a few years after this service in the legislature died, remarkably, of "acute indigestion".

Major McNulty's legislative tenure on each end just missed Theodore Roosevelt's earlier tenure therein and Roosevelt's later return to New York state politics as its Governor.

New York State Senate
Preceded by Henry Wolfert	New York State Senate; 6th District; 1896–1898	Succeeded by William J. La Roche
