= Henry E. Warner =

American politician (1864–1953)

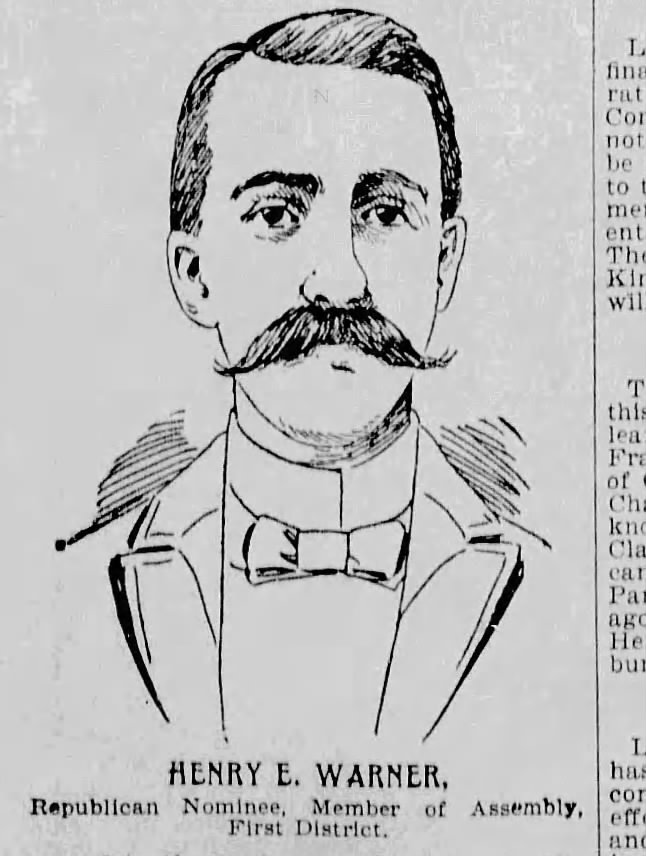
Henry E. Warner

Henry E. Warner (May 20, 1864 – September 12, 1953) was an American politician who served in the New York State Assembly for two terms from 1896 to 1897.

== Life ==
Warner was born on May 20, 1864, in Albion, New York. He began studying law and graduated from Albany Law School in 1885. In 1888, he moved to North Tonawanda.

A Republican, Warner was nominated for the New York State Assembly in September 1895 to represent Niagara County's First District in the 119th New York State Legislature. He defeated Democrat Augustus F. Premus in November to earn election. He was reelected in November 1896 for a second term. In the election, Niagara County experienced voting machine malfunctions in multiple districts, with one machine in Warner's district failing to register any votes for him, despite multiple voters publicly admitting they voted for Warner.

He served on the Special Trust Investigation Committee while in the Assembly and worked to push through legislation in the state Senate to incorporate North Tonawanda into a city. The bill was signed by Governor Frank S. Black in April 1897.

Warner announced in September 1897 that he was declining to run for a third term in the Assembly. He later worked in the state comptroller's office as a court fund examiner and as a state title attorney at the New York state law department's Buffalo district until his retirement in 1935. He also wrote multiple books on real estate law.

Warner died on September 12, 1953 at his daughter’s home in Westfield, New Jersey.

New York State Assembly
Preceded by John H. Clark	New York State Assembly; Niagara County, First District; 1896–1897	Succeeded by Dow Vroman
