= Patrick J. Kerrigan =

American politician

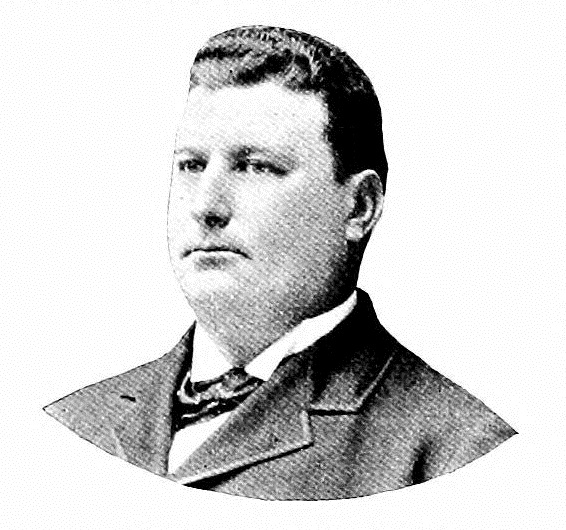
Patrick J. Kerrigan (1894)

Patrick J. Kerrigan (1864 – December 23, 1895) was an American politician from New York.

== Life ==
He was born in 1864, in New York City. He attended the public schools. Then he became a house painter, and later worked in the city's street cleaning department.

Kerrigan entered politics as a Democrat. He was a member of the New York State Assembly (New York Co., 19th D.) in 1894. His election was contested by the Republican candidate Edward R. Duffy on the grounds that Kerrigan, at the time of his election, had held a civil office in the City of New York which would render him ineligible to the State legislature. The Assembly Committee on Elections rejected the contest, finding that a section foreman in the street cleaning department is a city employee but not a city officer.

In November 1894, he ran for re-election, but was defeated by Republican Welton C. Percy. In November 1895, after re-apportionment, he ran in the 17th District of New York County for the Assembly, and was again elected, but died before his second term began.

Kerrigan died suddenly on December 23, 1895, in Savannah, Georgia, of dropsy.

New York State Assembly
Preceded by Thomas C. O'Sullivan	New York State Assembly; New York County, 19th District; 1894	Succeeded by Welton C. Percy
