= John F. Ahearn =

American politician (1853–1920)

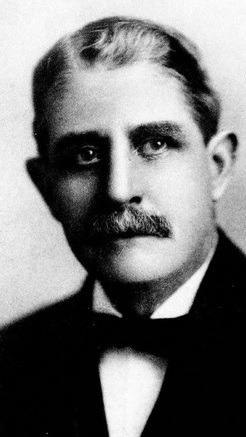

John F. Ahearn (April 18, 1853 – December 19, 1920) was an American politician and publisher. A prominent New York City political figure and a member of the Tammany Hall political machine, he served in the New York State Assembly, the New York State Senate, and as Manhattan Borough President. He was owner of the T. J. Hayes Printing Company which published plays and other works related to the theatre.

== Biography ==
John Francis Ahearn was born in Manhattan on April 18, 1853. He was educated in New York City's public schools and pursued a business career, working as a clerk and manager in several different firms.

He was a member of the New York State Assembly (New York Co., 4th D.) in 1882. Upon leaving the legislature Ahearn was appointed to a clerkship in the New York City Police Court.

Ahearn was a member of the New York State Senate (6th D.) from 1890 to 1902, sitting in the 113th, 114th, 115th, 116th (all four 6th D.), 117th, 118th (both 8th D.), 119th, 120th, 121st, 122nd, 123rd, 124th and 125th New York State Legislatures (all seven 10th D.). At first a member of the "County Democracy" (the Anti-Tammany faction of the New York Democrats), later he became an active member of the Tammany Hall organization, and created a political organization loyal to him, the John F. Ahearn Association.

In 1903 Ahearn was elected Manhattan Borough President. Governor Charles Evans Hughes removed Ahearn from office for corruption and neglect in 1907, but Ahearn won the aldermanic election to fill the vacancy.

In 1909 the New York Court of Appeals ruled that the aldermanic election that returned Ahearn to office following his removal by Hughes was illegal. With Hughes' action being upheld, Ahearn finally vacated the borough presidency.

Ahearn died in New York City on December 19, 1920 at age 67. He was married to Elizabeth Atwell, the sister of vaudeville agent William Atwell. The couple had two sons and three daughters together. Both of their sons were leaders in the Democratic Party in New York. Their son Edward J. Ahearn (1891–1934) was elected to the New York State Assembly as a representative for the fourth district; succeeding his father in that position in 1921. After Edward's death in 1934, their other son William was also elected to that same position; a post he held at the time of Elizabeth's death in 1937. Their daughter, Anna Marie Ahearn, was married to New York senator William J. Murray. Elizabeth's brother William was married to singer and actress Artie Hall.

In 1923, a small triangular-shaped park at the corner of Grand Street and East Broadway (near Ahearn's long-time home at 296 East Broadway) was named Ahearn Park.

New York State Assembly
Preceded by John Henry McCarthy	New York State Assembly; New York County, 4th District; 1882	Succeeded by Patrick H. Roche
New York State Senate
Preceded by Thomas F. Grady	New York State Senate; 6th District; 1890–1893	Succeeded by John McCarty
Preceded by Martin T. McMahon	New York State Senate; 8th District; 1894–1895	Succeeded by Albert A. Wray
Preceded by Frank A. O'Donnel	New York State Senate; 10th District; 1896–1902	Succeeded by Daniel J. Riordan
Political offices
Preceded by Jacob A. Cantor	Borough President of Manhattan; 1904–1909	Succeeded by John Cloughen; Acting
