= Charles L. Guy =

American politician (1856–1930)

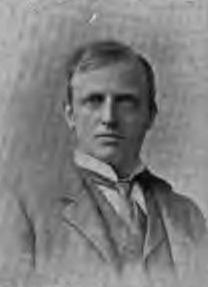
Charles L. Guy (1897)

Charles Lewis Guy (January 6, 1856 in New York City – July 21, 1930 in Washington, Litchfield County, Connecticut) was an American lawyer and politician from New York.

== Life ==
He attended the public schools, the College of the City of New York, and Columbia Law School. He studied law with Elihu Root, was admitted to the bar in 1881, and practiced law in New York City.

He was a member of the New York State Senate from 1894 to 1898, sitting in the 117th, 118th (both 13th D.), 119th, 120th and 121st New York State Legislatures (all three 21st D.).

He was a justice of the New York Supreme Court (1st D.) from 1907 to 1926 when he retired upon reaching the constitutional age limit.

He died on July 21, 1930, in Washington, Connecticut, of "heart disease".

== Sources ==
- The New York Red Book compiled by Edgar L. Murlin (published by James B. Lyon, Albany NY, 1897; pg. 149f and 404)
- Sketches of the members of the Legislature in The Evening Journal Almanac (1895; pg. 49)
- TAMMANY JUDGES WIN IN THIS COUNTY in NYT on November 7, 1906
- NEW JUDGES SEATED; WADHAMS RESIGNS in NYT on January 4, 1921
- CHARLES L. GUY DIES in NYT on July 23, 1930 (subscription required)

New York State Senate
Preceded by William P. Richardson	New York State Senate; 13th District; 1894–1895	Succeeded by Bernard F. Martin
Preceded by Frederick D. Kilburn	New York State Senate; 21st District; 1896–1898	Succeeded by Richard H. Mitchell
