= East Eden, New York =

Hamlet in New York, United States

Coordinates: 42°40′00″N 78°49′39″W

East Eden is a hamlet in the town of Eden in Erie County, New York, United States.
