= Charles H. Miller =

American politician

Charles H. "Charlie" Miller (May 2, 1918 – April 1, 1971) was an American farmer and politician.

Miller was born in Kellogg, Wabasha County, Minnesota. He graduated from Wabasha High School in Wabasha, Minnesota and went to vocational school where he received his diploma in management and finance. Miller lived with his wife and family, in Kellogg, Minnesota, and was a grain and dairy farmer. He served as the Watopa Township, Wabasha County, Minnesota township clerk and on the Watopa Township School Board and was the school board clerk. He served in the Minnesota House of Representatives in 1963 and 1964 and from 1967 until his death in 1971. Miller was a Democrat. He died from a heart attack at the University of Minnesota Hospitals in Minneapolis, Minnesota, while still in office.
