= Gherardi =

Gherardi is a surname of Northern Italian origin. It is particularly prevalent in the regions of Emilia-Romagna, Lombardy, and Tuscany. The name comes from the Germanic words gari > ger- (meaning 'spear') and -hard (meaning 'hard/strong/brave'). The first recorded use of the name dates back to 970 AD with the Gherardighi family, who owned five castles in Tuscany. Over time, the name has been shortened, and numerous variations are found throughout Italy. According to Italy Gen, approximately 1,800 people with the surname Gerardi reside in Northern Italy. Globally, there are approximately 2,500 people who bear this surname.

Some examples of known people with the last name:

- Alessandro Gherardi (born 1988), Italian footballer
- Anna Maria Gherardi (1939–2014), Italian actress and voice actress
- Antonio Gherardi (1638–1702), Italian painter, architect and sculptor
- Bancroft Gherardi (1832–1903), U.S. Navy rear admiral
- Bancroft Gherardi, Jr. (1873–1941), American electrical engineer
- Cristofano Gherardi (1508–1556), Italian painter
- Évariste Gherardi (1663–1700), Italian actor and playwright
- Filippo Gherardi (1643–1704), Italian painter
- Francesca Gherardi (1955–2013), Italian zoologist, ethologist, and ecologist
- Giuseppe Gherardi (1750–1828), Italian painter, active in the Neoclassic style
- Lorenzo Gherardi (1645–1727), Roman Catholic prelate who served as Bishop of Recanati e Loreto
- Maffeo Gherardi (1406–1492), Cardinal of Venice
- Marcella Gherardi Michelangeli (born 1943), Italian former actress and singer
- Piero Gherardi (1909–1971), Italian film costume and set designer

== See also ==
- Gherardi Davis (1858–1941), New York politician
- USS Gherardi (DD-637), a Gleaves-class destroyer
- Palazzo Gherardi, 15th-century building in the centre of Florence, Italy
- Gherardini
- Ghirardi
