= CRDA 60 t motor torpedo boat =

Italian type of motor torpedo boat

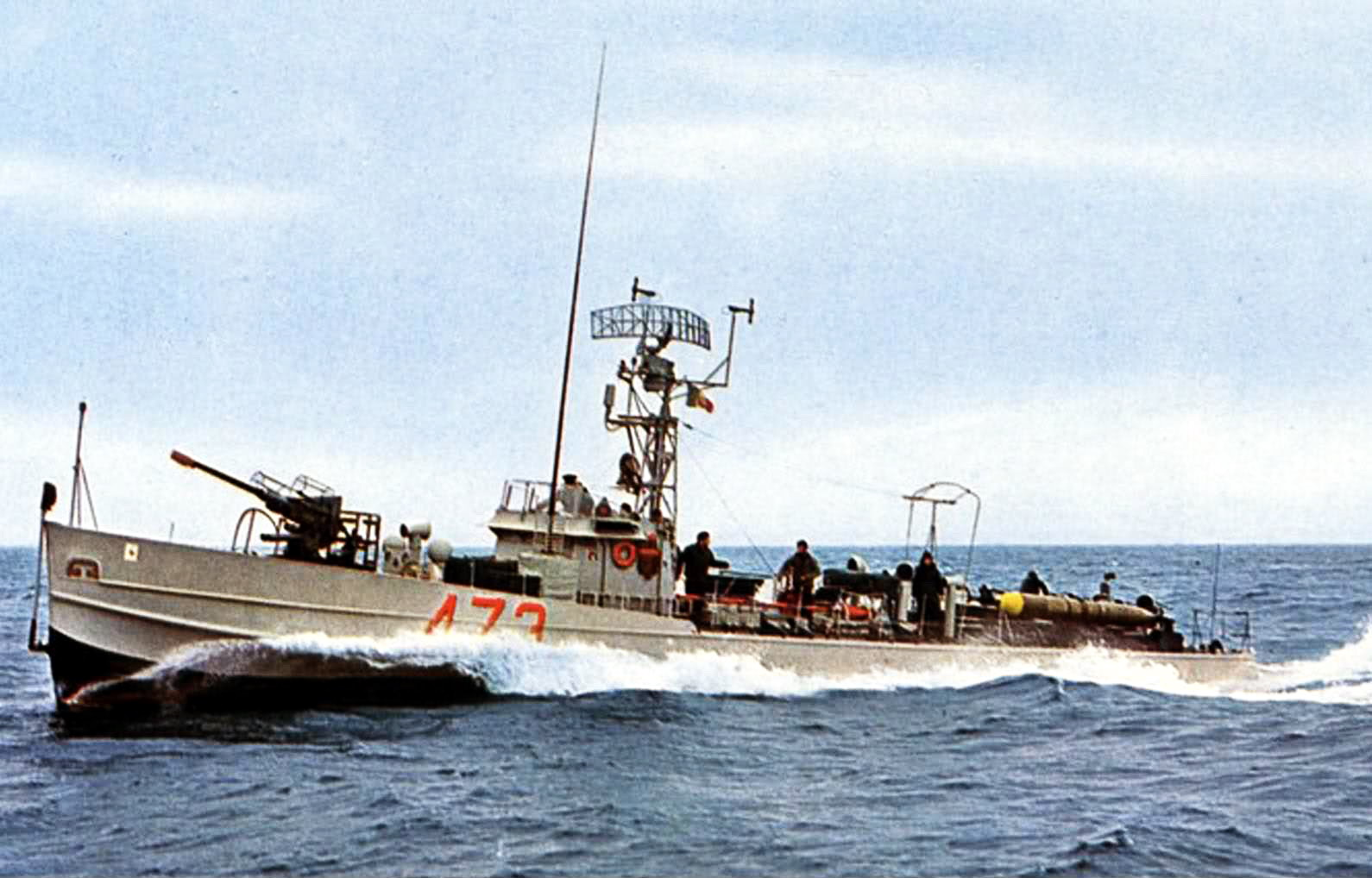
- MS 473 (ex MS 31, now on display at the Museo Storico Navale) after the 1950s upgrades

Class overview
- Builders: Cantieri Riuniti dell'Adriatico, Monfalcone
- Operators: World War II; Regia Marina; Post war; Italian Navy; Soviet Navy; French Navy
- Built: 1942–43
- In commission: 1942–1970s
- Completed: 36
- Lost: 22
- Preserved: 2

General characteristics
- Type: Motor torpedo boat
- Displacement: 63–66 tons
- Length: 28 m (92 ft)
- Beam: 4.3 m (14 ft)
- Draught: 1.6 m (5 ft 3 in)
- Installed power: 3,450 brake horsepower (2,570 kW)
- Propulsion: 3 × Isotta Fraschini Asso 1000 petrol engines
- Speed: 35 knots (65 km/h; 40 mph)
- Armament: 2 × 533 mm torpedo tubes; 2 × 450 mm torpedo launchers; 2-4 × Breda 20/65 cannons; Depth charges

The Motosilurante CRDA 60 t (also known as MS boat) was a type of motor torpedo boat built for the Regia Marina during World War II. It was designed on the pattern of German S-boats — some early examples of which were captured by the Italians from Yugoslav Navy — to complement the faster but less seaworthy MAS boats.

It was two Motosiluranti CRDA that scored the single biggest success by fast torpedo craft in the Second World War, the sinking of British light cruiser HMS Manchester. After the conflict surviving boats remained in service with the Marina Militare—the last ones being ultimately dismissed after almost 40 years of service, in the late 1970s.

== History ==
=== Background ===
Italian motor torpedo boats, the MAS, were built like speedboats, sacrificing seaworthiness for speed and manoeuvrability; for example the MAS 500-class, the latest type at the outbreak of the war, had a double-stepped planing hull and could top 45 knots (83 km/h; 52 mph). Wartime experience quickly showed MAS usage was heavily affected by sea conditions; the Regia Marina began searching for a more seaworthy alternative. The solution came with the acquisition of six captured Yugoslavian Orjen-class motor torpedo boats, built by Lürssen of Germany in the 1930s after the early Kriegsmarine Schnellboote S-2 design; the boats were re-designated MAS 3 D to MAS 8 D and pressed into Navy service. Though these early examples were slower than their Italian counterparts, the S-Boote were able to operate in rough seas, thanks to their rounded hulls.

=== Design and war service ===
The Cantieri Riuniti dell'Adriatico firm of Monfalcone was tasked with reproducing the boats domestically. The quickly developed new torpedo boat type was designated CRDA 60 t after its builder and displacement, and classed Motosiluranti (singular motosilurante, MS in short) by the Navy. The motosiluranti were of wooden construction, with steel reinforcements. Unlike the diesel-engined German S-Boote, they were powered by triple Isotta Fraschini Asso 1000 W18 petrol engines from the MAS 500, each producing 1,150 brake horsepower (860 kW). They displaced from 62 to 66 tons and had a top speed of 34–35 knots (63–65 km/h; 39–40 mph). Armament consisted of two 533 mm torpedo tubes, two Breda 20/65 mod. 35 anti-aircraft cannons in single mounts or four in two double mounts, and depth charge racks.

Thirty-six vessels were completed from late 1941 to the Autumn of 1943, in two series of 18 boats each. The first series included hull numbers from MS 11 to MS 16, 11–16, 21–26, and 31–36; the second MS 51 to MS 56, 61–66, and 71–76. Some changes were made from series 1 to 2, most notably a raised bow, redesigned torpedo tubes closed by hatches, and the addition of a pair of MAS-type 450 mm torpedo launchers at the rear of the hull.

In August 1942, during Operation Pedestal (referenced in Italian sources as Battaglia di Mezzo Agosto) two MS boats—MS 16 and MS 22—sank, in a night action, the British light cruiser HMS Manchester off Cap Bon. This 11,000-ton cruiser was the largest warship sunk by fast torpedo craft of any nation in the Second World War. The next month two MS boats were used to infiltrate a party of 14 Italian marines behind the Allied lines in Egypt on 3 September 1942. The marines blew up a railway and an aqueduct before being captured.

During the Sicilian campaign there were a number of night actions involving Italian MS boats. An indecisive clash took place in the early hours of 13 July 1943 between the British destroyer HMS Tetcott escorting an LST in the process of landing Royal Marines on Agnone Bagni, north of Augusta, and MS 71 and MS 63, which were trying to insert Italian Army commandos behind enemy lines. The following night, MTB 655, MTB 656 and MTB 633 encountered and engaged MS 36 and MS 64 south of Messina. The Italian boats received no damage, while the British craft were slightly damaged by shore batteries. In what became one of the last surface engagements between Italian and Allied naval forces, the American destroyer USS Rhind, assisted by the USS Gherardi, sank MS 66 and disabled MS 63, in the course of a naval sweep west of Capo d'Orlando, Sicily on 3 August 1943. The damaged MS 63 managed to limp away after firing a torpedo at Gherardi.

=== Post war ===
Of the 36 boats built, 14 survived the conflict. Only nine of these entered service in the newly formed Marina Militare, as six were given up to Allied countries following the 1947 Paris peace treaty: four went to the Soviet Union and two to France. Furthermore, since the treaty conditions forbade Italian ownership of motor torpedo boats, the nine remaining boats lost their torpedoes, were reclassified motovedette (patrol boats) and given new hull numbers—from MV 611 to MV 619. Such prohibitions expired in 1952, after Italy's 1949 NATO accession; the boats regained both torpedoes and MS classification. Finally in 1954 they were redesignated one last time, gaining hull numbers MS 471 to 475 and MS 481 to 484. The vessels were at the orders of the COMOS (Comando Siluranti) together with the more numerous ex-American PT boats. At this time the two surviving series 1 CRDAs were upgraded to series 2 specifications, gaining the rear 450 mm torpedo launchers. In 1956 a reconstruction plan was drawn up: seven of the remaining boats were to be transformed into flexible units able to serve as gunboat, torpedo boat or fast mine layer. As a result of budget constraints and plans for equivalent modern, all-metal boats, only four of the motosiluranti were converted by the Baglietto shipyards—MS 472, MS 473, MS 474 and MS 481, the others being decommissioned. Extensive changes were made to the superstructure and hull, including removal of the 533 mm torpedo installations; new radio equipment and a radar were installed. The armament included a Bofors 40 mm gun fore, a second Bofors aft, and twin 450 mm torpedo launchers or naval mines aft.

The four converted boats re-entered service between 1959 and 1961, grouped into the 42nd motor torpedo boat flotilla. Two were finally decommissioned in the mid 1970s, the other two at the beginning of the following decade. Nowadays two of the boats are preserved: MS 472 is a monument in Ravenna, while MS 473 is on display in the Ship's Pavilion of the Museo Storico Navale in Venice.
