= Gherardi Davis =

American politician

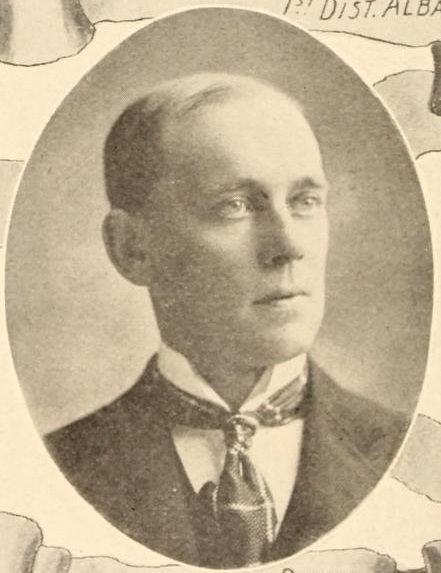
- Photograph of Davis, c. 1900

Member of the New York State Assembly
- In office 1899–1902
- Preceded by: Francis E. Laimbeer
- Succeeded by: George B. Agnew

Personal details
- Born: October 15, 1858 San Francisco, California, U.S.
- Died: March 9, 1941 (aged 82) New York City, New York, U.S.
- Party: Republican
- Spouse: Alice King (m. 1894; died 1920)
- Relations: Aaron Bancroft (great-grandfather, twice); John Davis (grandfather); Bancroft Gherardi (uncle); Bancroft Gherardi, Jr. (cousin)
- Parent(s): George Henry Davis; Clara Jane Gherardi

Gherardi Davis (October 15, 1858 – March 9, 1941) was an American lawyer, writer and politician from New York.

== Life ==
He was born on October 15, 1858 in San Francisco, California, the son of George Henry Davis (1824–1897) and Clara Jane (Gherardi) Davis (1827–1897).

Governor of Massachusetts John Davis was his grandfather; Rear Admiral Bancroft Gherardi was his uncle; and electrical engineer Bancroft Gherardi, Jr. was his first cousin.

In 1868, the family went to Europe, and Gherardi attended school in Germany and college in France.

== Career ==
In 1879, he returned to the United States, and studied law, first in Washington, D.C., and then in New York City. He was admitted to the bar, and practiced law in New York City.

Davis was a member of the New York State Assembly (New York Co., 27th D.) in 1899, 1900, 1901 and 1902; and was Chairman of the Committee on Public Lands and Forestry in 1902.

On March 20, 1903, he was appointed as Third Deputy New York City Police Commissioner.

=== Sailing ===
In 1910, he became interested in sailing boats. He competed in regattas with his yacht Alice, and won many prizes.

== Personal life ==
On April 7, 1894, he married Alice King (1860–1920), daughter of State Senator John A. King. Gherardi and Alice Davis published several works on military standards.

He died on March 9, 1941, in the Harkness Pavilion of the Columbia–Presbyterian Medical Center in Manhattan.

== Works ==
- Fahnen und Standarten aus dem Kriege von 1870–71 (New York, 1901)
- Regimental Colors in the War of the Revolution (privately printed at the Gilliss Press; New York; 1907)
- Regimental Colors of the German Armies in the War of 1870–1871 (privately printed at the Gilliss Press, New York, 1911)
- The Gospels – by a Layman (printed at the Gilliss Press; New York; 1916)

== Sources ==
New York State Assembly
Preceded by Francis E. Laimbeer	New York State Assembly; New York County, 27th District; 1899–1902	Succeeded by George B. Agnew
