= MAS (motorboat) =

Boat used by the Italian Royal Navy

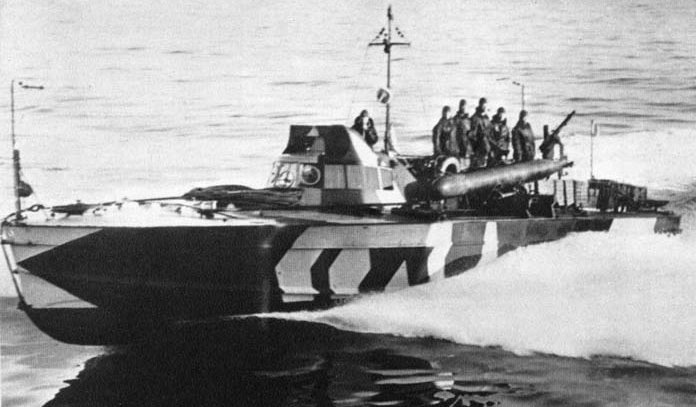
Camouflaged World War II MAS in the Mediterranean Sea

Motoscafo armato silurante (torpedo-armed motorboat), alternatively Motoscafo antisommergibili (anti-submarine motorboat) and commonly abbreviated as MAS, was a class of fast torpedo-armed vessels used by the Regia Marina (Italian Royal Navy) during World War I and World War II. Originally, "MAS" referred to motobarca armata SVAN (armed motorboat SVAN), Società Veneziana Automobili Navali (Naval Automobile Society of Venice).

The MAS were petrol-engined planing boats with displacements of 20–30 tonnes (depending on the class), a 10-man crew and armament composed of two torpedoes, heavy machine guns and occasionally a 37 mm or 20 mm cannon.

In the context of the unit title Flottiglia MAS (assault craft flotilla; the most famous of which was the Decima MAS of World War II), the term "MAS" is an acronym for Mezzi d'Assalto (assault craft).

== World War I ==
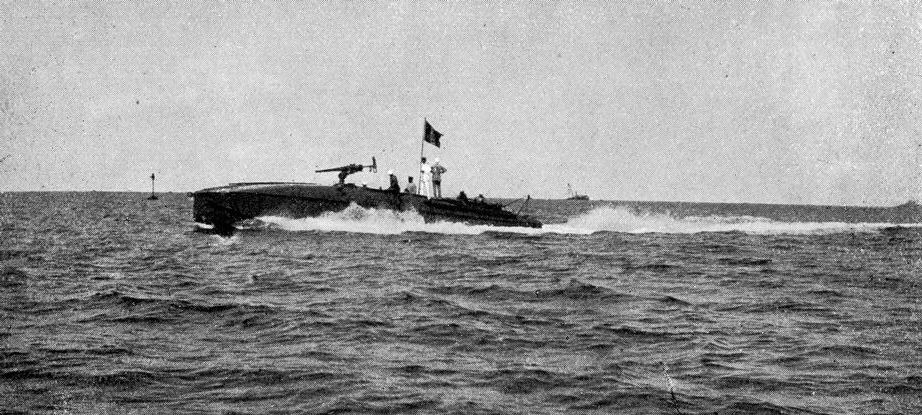
An early MAS, from a magazine article published in January 1917

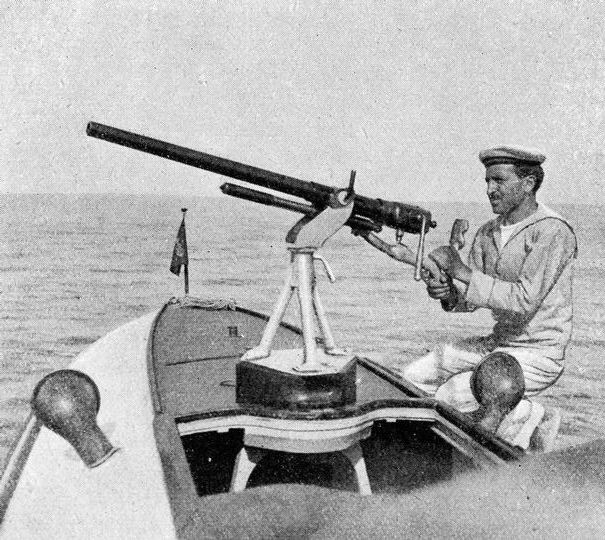
An Italian sailor manning a quick-firing gun, a 1-pounder (37 mm) Hotchkiss, on a MAS, 1917

MAS were widely employed by Regia Marina during World War I in 1915–1918. Models used were directly derived from compact civilian motorboats, provided with petrol engines which were compact and reliable (characteristics which were not common at the time). They were used not only in the anti-submarine patrol role, but also for daring attacks against major units of the Austro-Hungarian Navy.

A significant success came in December 1917, when an MAS boat managed to sink the pre-dreadnought battleship SMS Wien in Trieste harbor. The greatest success of Italian MAS was the sinking of the Austro-Hungarian battleship SMS Szent István off Pula on 10 June 1918 by a boat commanded by Luigi Rizzo. MAS boats later engaged in the Second Battle of Durazzo in October 1918.

The main Austrian fleet remained securely at anchor in the harbour at Pola (now Pula in Croatia), protected by several layers of defensive booms, impassable to conventional MAS boats. A special version, the Grillo-class tracked torpedo motorboat or Barchino Saltatore (Jumping Boats), officially classified as tank marino (sea tank) or MAS speciale, were designed by 1918. The craft featured a pair of spiked continuous tracks, intended to allow them to clamber over the booms which were supported by large timber baulks. The boats were powered by an electric motor for a silent approach and carried two torpedoes. Four were built; the first two were scuttled when their slow motors failed to get them to the harbour booms at Pola before daybreak and in a second operation, another boat made such a loud clattering noise climbing the booms that it was spotted and destroyed by gunfire.

== Interwar Period and Spanish Civil War ==
In 1926, four MAS boats were built for and purchased by the Royal Albanian Navy. They were named Tirana, Saranda, Durres, and Vlorë. During the Italian invasion of Albania they were seized and put into service by Italian forces. All survived World War II and in 1945 were returned to Albania. Four units were transferred to the Nationalist Navy during the Spanish Civil War in 1938: Sicilia (LT-18), ex MAS 100; Nápoles (LT-19), ex MAS 223; Cándido Pérez (LT-16), ex MAS 435; and Javier Quiroga (LT-17), ex MAS 436.

== World War II ==
Italian MAS continued to be improved after the end of World War I, thanks to the availability of Isotta Fraschini engines. The MAS of World War II had a maximum speed of 45 kn (52 mph; 83 km/h) and mounted two 450 mm (18 in) torpedoes and one Breda 13.2 mm machine-gun. Isotta-Fraschini produced its ASM 180 series of marine engines for the MAS from 1933 to 1955. The standard engine in World War II was the ASM 184, a 18-cylinder machine capable of producing 1,500 hp (1,100 kW) with 2,000 rpm.

In 1940 there were 48 MAS 500-class units available. Older units were used in secondary theatres, such as the Italian East Africa. Notable war actions performed by MAS include the torpedoing of the Royal Navy C-class cruiser HMS Capetown by MAS 213 of the 21st MAS Squadron working within the Red Sea Flotilla off Massawa, Eritrea; and the failed Raid on Grand Harbour of Malta in July 1941, which caused the loss of two motorboats, MAS 451 and MAS 452, the latter recovered by the British, put in service as a tender and renamed XMAS. Five MAS were scuttled in Massawa in the first week of April 1941 as a part of the Italian plan for the wrecking of Massawa harbor in the face of the British advance. MAS 204, 206, 210, 213, and 216 were sunk in the harbor; four of the boats were in need of mechanical repairs and could not be evacuated.

On 24 July 1941, amid heavy fire from the escorts, MAS 532 torpedoed and crippled the transport Sydney Star, escorted by the destroyer Cossack and part of the Operation Substance (Convoy GM 1). The steamer managed to limp to Malta assisted by the destroyer HMAS Nestor.

On 1 December 1941, two Italian MAS boats engaged with torpedoes and machine gun fire the Soviet icebreaker Anastas Mykoyan, en route from the Dardanelles to Suez, forcing it to run aground on the Turkish coast off Kastelorizo. The lifeboat of the icebreaker was hit and exploded after being dropped overboard, while the ship itself was holed by some 150 machine gun rounds. The four torpedoes launched at the Soviet vessel missed their target. Even though the Soviet vessel was refloated and reached Haifa for repairs the next day, the action compelled the Turkish government to intern eight Soviet ships set to repeat the same journey. Also in the Aegean Sea, on 27 April 1942, near Kastelorizo, a flotilla of MAS rescued a motor sailing boat with Jewish refugees from Romania. On 15 March 1943, MAS 545 and 559 seized the Greek motor sailing ship Aghios Dimitros, which had been taken over by a British Army boarding party from the Greek submarine Papanikolis and was being rerouted to Turkish waters. The small vessel was carrying German ammunition. The British crew and a Greek naval officer were taken prisoner.

MAS 554, 554 and 557 sank three allied freighters on the night of 13 August 1942 off Cape Bon, in the course of Operation Pedestal, for a total tonnage of 48,500 tons. On 29 August 1942, a smaller type of MAS boat, the MTSM, torpedoed the British destroyer Eridge off El Daba, Egypt, disabling it for the remainder of the war.

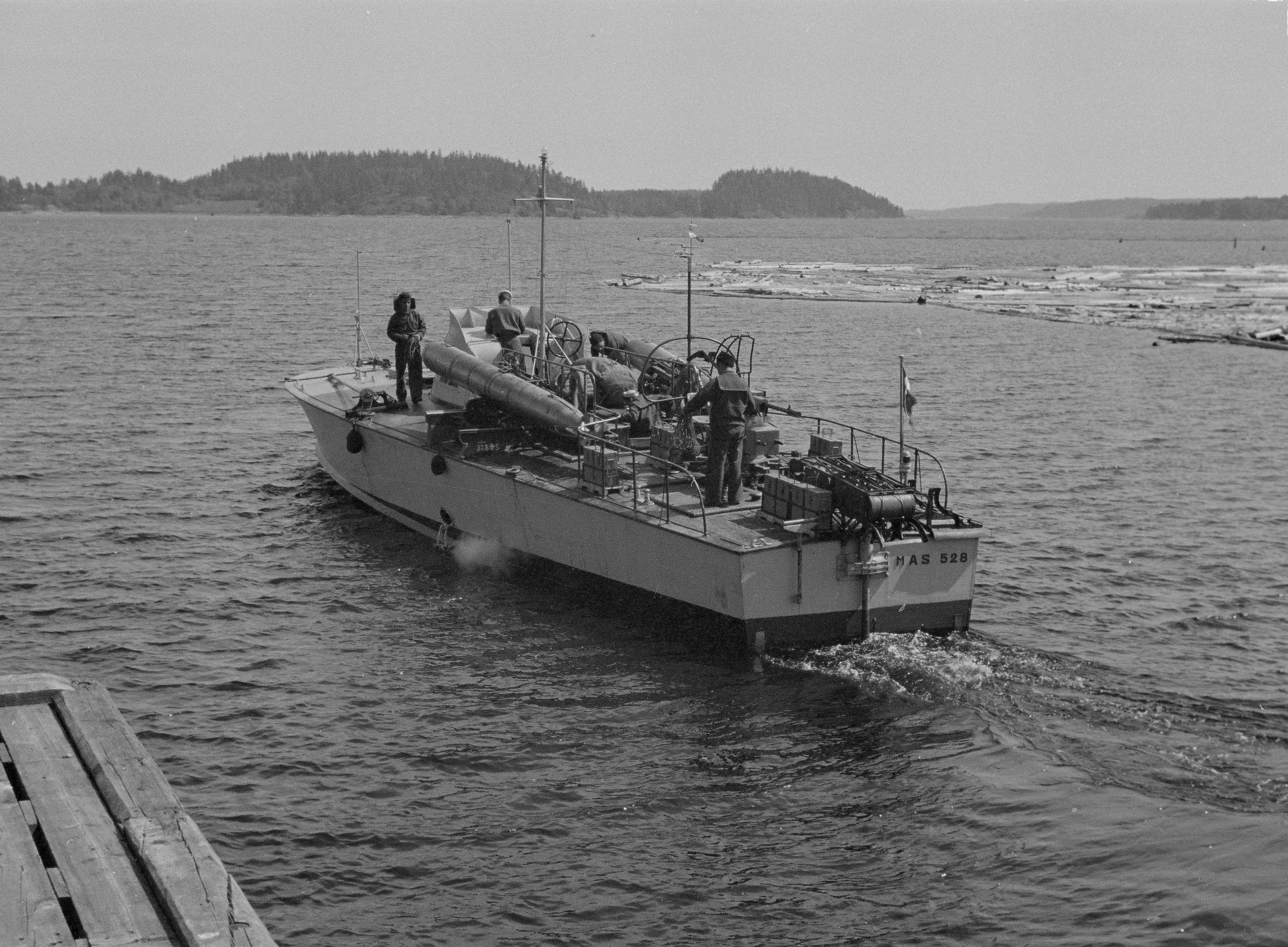
The Italian torpedo boat MAS 528 on Lake Ladoga in June 1942, during the Siege of Leningrad

A flotilla of MAS served at German request as reinforcements in the Black Sea for the planned attack on Sevastopol in June 1942. The MAS squadron came under intense air attack from Soviet fighter-bombers and torpedo boats but performed well. They sank the 5,000-ton steamer Abkhazia and disabled the 10,000-ton transport Fabritius, which was subsequently destroyed by German Stuka dive-bombers. MAS boats destroyed troop barges and damaged Soviet warships. A MAS boat commander, Sub-Lieutenant Ettore Bisagno, was killed in battle. One MAS was destroyed and three damaged by fighter-bombers in September 1942 during a heavy attack on Yalta. In the early hours of 3 August 1942, three MAS boats torpedoed and disabled the Soviet cruiser Molotov south-west of Kerch.

In May 1943, the seven MAS boats in the Black Sea were transferred to the Kriegsmarine. In August that year, they were transferred to the Romanian Navy. These seven boats were wooden-hulled, each displacing 25 tons. Top speed amounted to 42 knots, generated by petrol engines powering two shafts. They were armed with one 13 mm heavy machine gun or one 20 mm anti-aircraft gun, 6 depth charges and two 450 mm torpedoes.

Another flotilla of four MAS, the XII Squadriglia MAS, was deployed to Lake Ladoga in April 1942 to support the siege of Leningrad. They claim the sinking of a Soviet gunboat of the Bira class, a 1,300-ton cargo ship and several barges. Soviet sources say that the gunboat, the Selemdzha, was only lightly damaged when the torpedo exploded in the lake's bottom, with two wounded on board.

After the signing of the Cassibile agreement, MAS boats sank the German torpedo boat TA11 (ex French L'Iphigénie) at Piombino, on 11 September 1943.

The obsolescence of small MAS became apparent during the conflict, and they were increasingly replaced by larger Yugoslavian E-boats built in Germany and by new improved versions, classified "MS" (Moto Siluranti) by the Regia Marina.

A type of anti-submarine craft based on the MAS design was developed by the Italian Navy in World War II. This was the vedetta anti sommergibile, or "VAS", equipped with a good amount of anti-submarine warfare equipment given her small size.

== Cultural legacy ==
The Italian poet Gabriele d'Annunzio, who employed MAS in some of his World War I adventures, used the MAS acronym for his Latin motto: Memento audere semper ("remember always to dare").

== Surviving examples ==
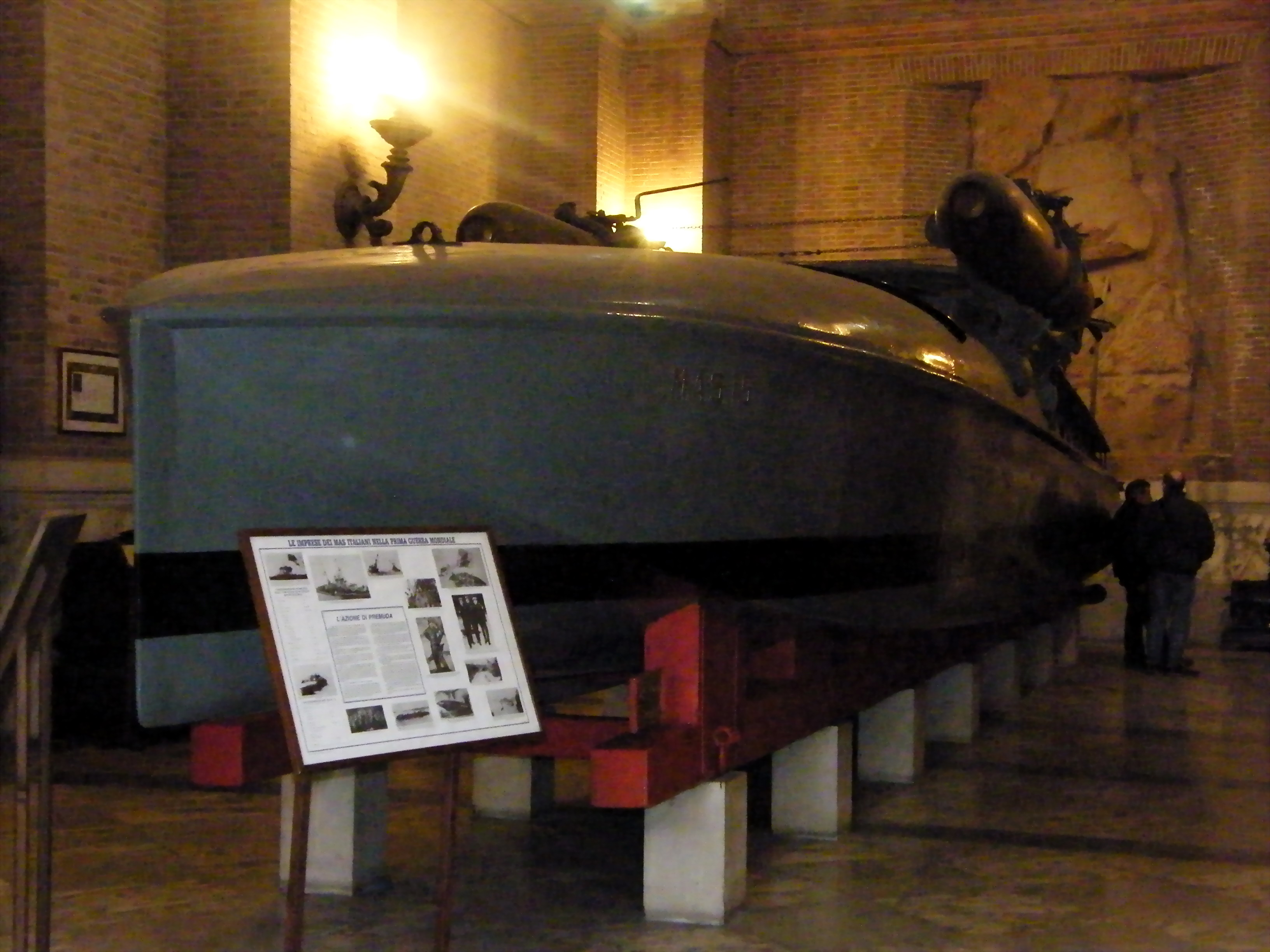
MAS 15 Preserved at the Vittoriano in Rome

Only two complete examples survive to this day

- MAS 15 is preserved at the Sacrario delle Bandiere naval museum located at the Vittoriano in Rome. In June 1918, it was the boat which sank the SMS Szent István.
- MAS 96 is preserved at the Vittoriale degli Italiani at Gardone Riviera by Lake Garda. In February 1918, it was the boat on which Gabriele d'Annunzio participated in the "Bakar mockery" raid.

== See also ==
- Decima Flottiglia MAS
- Motor torpedo boats
- E-boat
- MTSM motor torpedo boat
