= Grillo-class torpedo boat =

Specialized motorboat with tracks

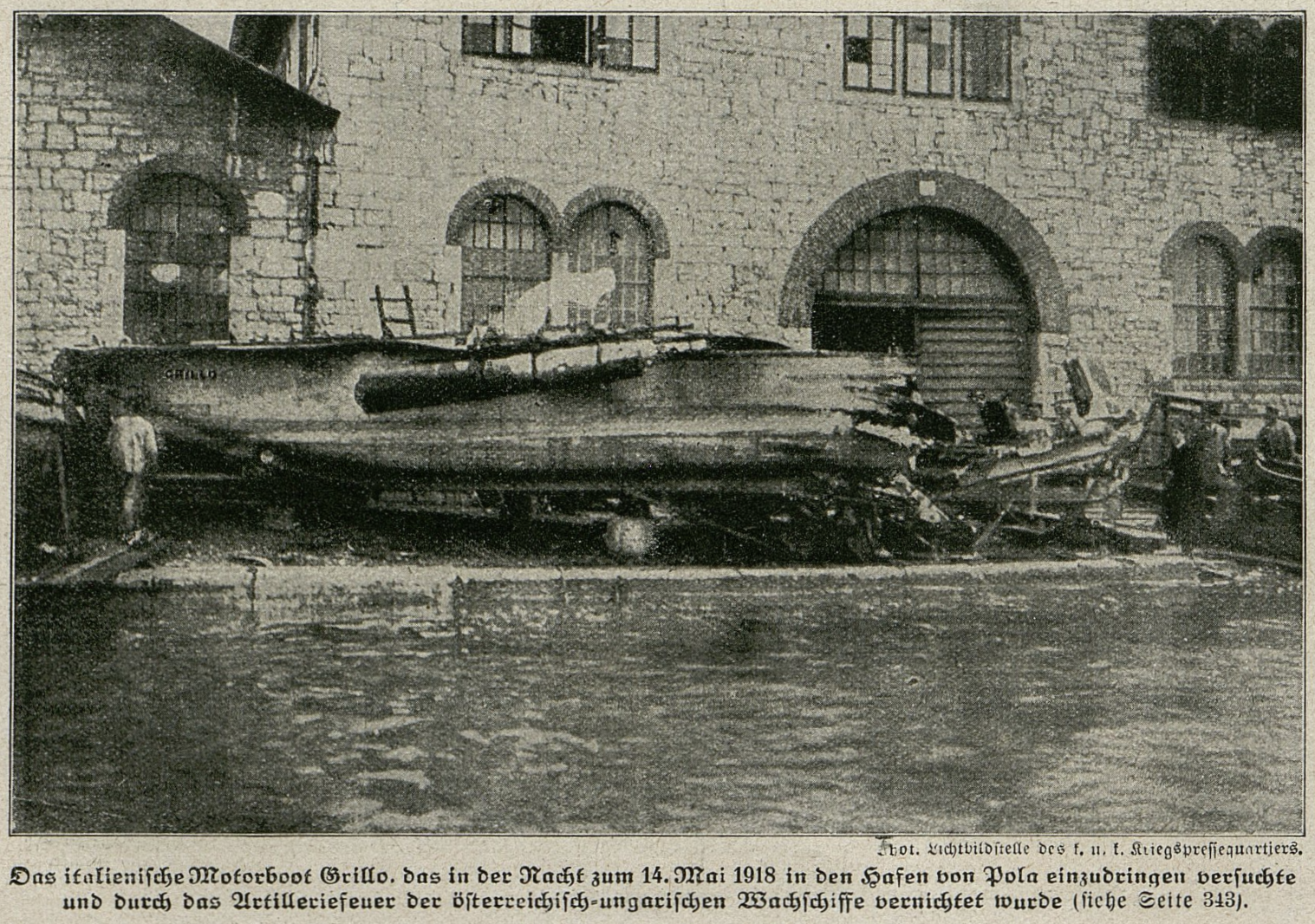
- Destroyed Italian motorboat Grillo, at Pula in May 1918

Class overview
- Builders: SVAN, Venice
- Operators: Regia Marina
- Built: 1918
- In commission: 1918
- Planned: 4
- Completed: 4
- Lost: 3
- Scrapped: 1

General characteristics
- Type: Torpedo boat
- Displacement: 8 tons
- Length: 16 m (52 ft)
- Beam: 3.1 m (10 ft)
- Draught: 0.7 m (2 ft 4 in)
- Installed power: 10 hp (7.5 kW)
- Propulsion: 2 × Rognini & Balbo electric motors
- Speed: 4 knots (7.4 km/h; 4.6 mph)
- Complement: 4
- Armament: 2 × 450 mm (18 in) aircraft-type torpedoes

The Grillo class was a class of torpedo-armed motorboats in service with the Regia Marina (the Royal Navy of Italy) during the First World War. The notable feature of these vessels was that each was equipped with a pair of spiked continuous tracks, intended to allow them to climb over harbour booms and attack enemy shipping at anchor. In 1918, two attempts to use them to penetrate Austro-Hungarian harbour defences both ended in failure.

== Development ==
The Allied naval blockade had confined the dreadnoughts of the Austro-Hungarian Navy to the waters close to their principal naval bases in the Adriatic Sea. Wishing to avoid risking the numerically superior Italian battle fleet in an engagement in the confined coastal waters of the Adriatic, where the Austrians might achieve a local advantage close to their heavily fortified coasts and islands, the Regia Marina chose instead to conduct a "little war" using fast torpedo motorboats, Motoscafo armato silurante or MAS.

A successful attack by MAS torpedo boats on the Austrian base at Trieste on 9 December 1917, led to the requirement for a specialised version able to cross the more substantial harbour boom at the main Austrian base at Pola (present-day Pula in Croatia). Designed by engineer Attilio Bisio at the SVAN boatyard, the solution was a 16-metre (52 ft) shallow-draught motorboat with a track mounted on rhomboidal rails on each side, reminiscent of the arrangement on a British heavy tank. These tracks were driven by two 5-horsepower (3.7 kW) electric motors to ensure a silent approach and the links were fitted with hooked spikes, intended to grip the large timber baulks from which the cables and nets of the boom were suspended, enabling the vessel to simply crawl over the top of them. Armament consisted of two lightweight torpedoes mounted on either side of the boat on drop collars.

Originally designated Barchino Saltatore ("Jumping Boats"), four examples were built and were all commissioned in March 1918, named after various jumping insects. The craft were also classified as tank marino (sea tank) and MAS speciale by the technicians in charge of the project while being built at Venice's shipyard.

Name	Namesake	Entered service	Fate
Cavalletta	Grasshopper	March 1918	Scuttled off Pola, 13 April 1918
Grillo	Cricket	March 1918	Sunk in action at Pola, 14 May 1918
Locusta	Locust	March 1918	Abandoned and scrapped, 1920
Pulce	Flea	March 1918	Scuttled off Pola, 13 April 1918

== Service ==
The first attack by these vessels was on 13 April 1918. Two boats, Cavalletta and Pulce were towed into position outside the harbour, but the length of time required by the slow electric motors had been misjudged and neither vessel had reached the boom by daybreak, forcing their crews to scuttle the craft rather than let them be captured. On the night of 13 May 1918, Grillo attempted to enter the harbour; however, the loud clattering noise made by the tracks while crossing the wooden beams alerted the defenders. Grillo had crossed four of the five booms before coming under heavy coastal artillery fire, and she either sank or was scuttled. The Austrians later recovered the wreck and had begun work on a two copies when the war ended.

== Bibliography ==
- Sieche, Erwin F. (1983). "Re: Austria-Hungary's Naval Building Projects 1914–1918". Warship International. XX (2): 118–119. ISSN 0043-0374.
