= Francesca Gherardi =

Italian zoologist, ethologist, and ecologist

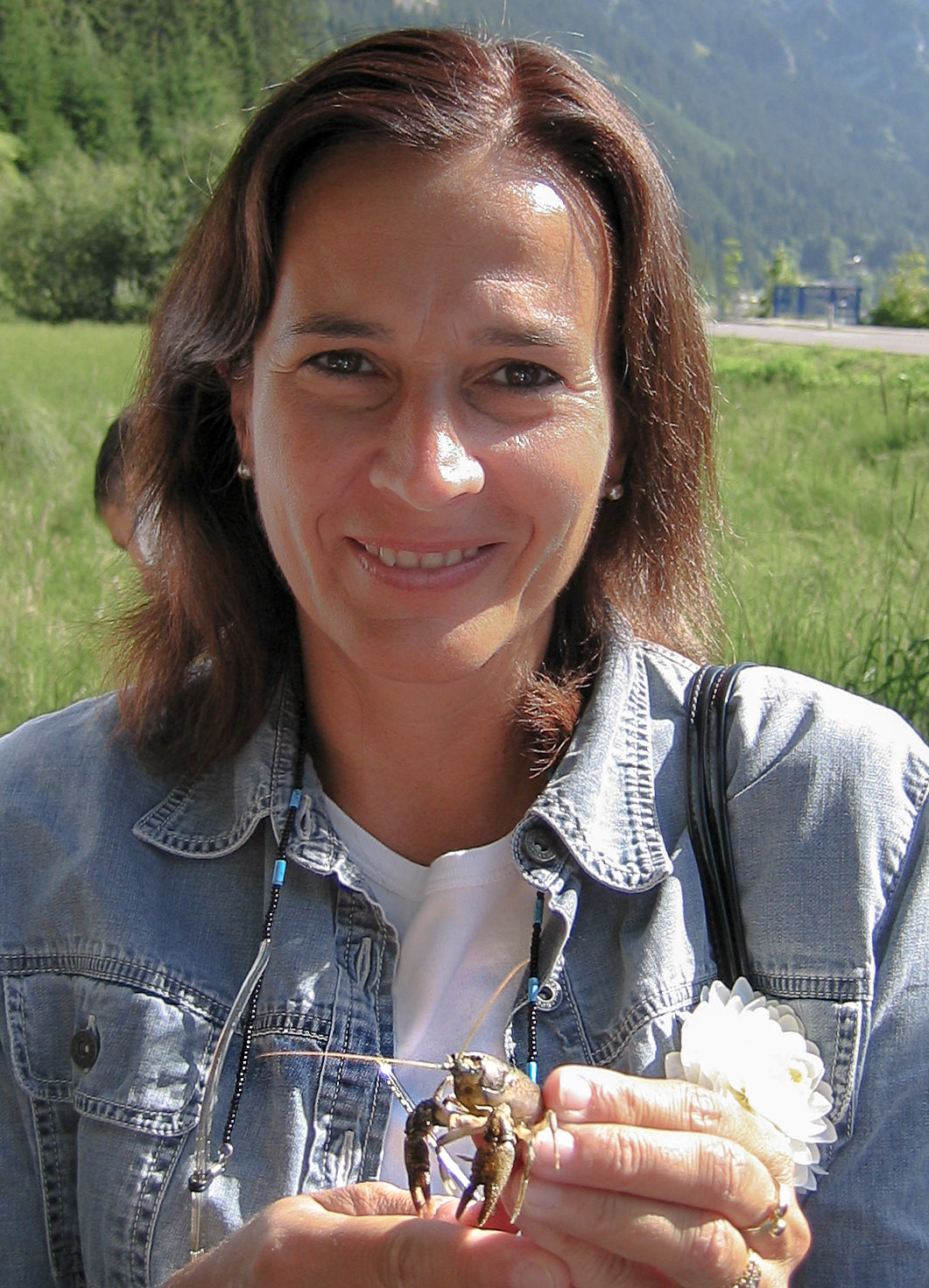
- Francesca Gherardi
- Born: 12 November 1955
- Died: 14 February 2013 (aged 57)
- Scientific career
- Fields: Zoology
- Workplaces: University of Florence

Francesca Gherardi (12 November 1955 – 14 February 2013) was an Italian zoologist, ethologist, and ecologist. Most of her work was performed at the Department of Biology of the University of Florence, Italy, where she was a researcher and an associate professor.

== Early life and education ==
Gherardi became interested in crustaceans as a teen, when one of her friends had a tropical aquarium. She obtained a master's degree in Biology in 1979 from the University of Florence with a thesis on aggressive behaviour, dominance hierarchies and individual recognition in decapods. She gained her PhD in Animal Biology (Ethology) at the University of Florence with a dissertation on the eco-ethology of the freshwater crab Potamon fluviatile. Marco Vannini was her advisor for both degrees.

== Career ==
In 1979-1984 and in 1987-1992 Gherardi taught sciences at high school; during this period she also collaborated with the science historian Bernardino Fantini (Geneva University). As a result of that collaboration she published two works on the history of Ethology, and spent a period at University of California at Berkeley.

In 1986 she participated in a research field trip organized by Centro di Studi per la Faunistica ed Ecologia Tropicali of the Italian Consiglio Nazionale delle Ricerche in Somalia, where for the first time she became interested in tropical Decapods, and in particular to hermit crabs and their gregarious behaviour. From 1988 to 1998, supported by subsequent programs of CNR, she studied Brachyura and Anomura from the East African mangrove swamps. That work resulted in a large number of published papers and intensive study of Mediterranean hermit crabs. Beginning in 1988, she developed a collaboration with Graziano Fiorito of the Stazione Zoologica Anton Dohrn, in Naples, Italy, that continued for more than 10 years working, together with her student Elena Tricarico, on the problem of individual recognition in Octopus vulgaris.

In 1992 she was appointed researcher at the University of Florence. She became associate professor for the same department in 2011.

The great bulk of her initial work concerned the social recognition in crustaceans and cephalopods: she was particularly known for her studies on hermit crabs (and the problem of shell choice) and on crayfish.

In the 1990s, Gherardi's research began to focus on the problem of biological invasions. She studied alien aquatic species, and in particular the red swamp crayfish Procambarus clarkii, a pest organism in European inland waters. She became a recognized authority on this species, developing with her students different methods of control.

She collaborated with scientists including Jelle Atema (Boston University), Patsy McLauhglin (Shannon Point Marine Center); Bella Galil (Tel Aviv University); Brian A. Hazlett (University of Michigan); Bernardino Fantini (University of Geneve); Catherine Souty-Grosset (Université dé Poitiers); Piero Genovesi (Chair of IUCN ISSG); Dianna K. Padilla (Stony Brook University).

Gherardi died suddenly on February 14, 2013.

== Recognitions ==
She occupied the most important positions of the International Association of Astacology, such as secretary-treasurer (2000–02), president-elect (2002–04), president (2004–06), and past president (2006–08), until in 2010 she was awarded the title of "Distinguished Astacologist 2010" for her achievements in the field. She was also a member of the Invasive Species Specialist Group (ISSG) of the IUCN (2002-2013), reviewing their entry on Procambarus clarkii and was also a member of the Freshwater Crab and Crayfish Specialist Group of the IUCN (2009-2013) and of the IUCN Species Survival Commission (2002-2013).

== Selected bibliography ==
- Luciana Borrelli; Francesca Gherardi; Graziano Fiorito (2006). Firenze University Press (ed.). Catalogue of Body Patterning in Cephalopoda (A). ISBN 978-88-8453-377-7.
- Francesca Gherardi; Claudia Corti; Manuela Gualtieri (3 January 2009). Eolss Publishers (ed.). Biodiversity conservation and habitat management. ISBN 978-1-84826-920-0.
- Francesca Gherardi (2007). Springer (ed.). Biological Invaders in Inland Waters: Profiles, Distribution and Threats. p. 536–. ISBN 978-1-4020-6029-8.
- Francesca Gherardi; Roberto Berti (2007). Elsevier (ed.). Chemical Ecology in Aquatic Systems.
- Simonetta Monechi (2010). Firenze University Press (ed.). Il museo di storia naturale dell'Università degli studi di Firenze. Le collezioni geologiche e paleontologiche. Ediz. italiana e inglese. ISBN 978-88-6453-189-2.
- Francesca Gherardi (1998). Taylor & Francis (ed.). Proceedings of the VIth Colloquium Crustacea Decapoda Mediterranea.
