= USS Gherardi =

Gleaves-class destroyer

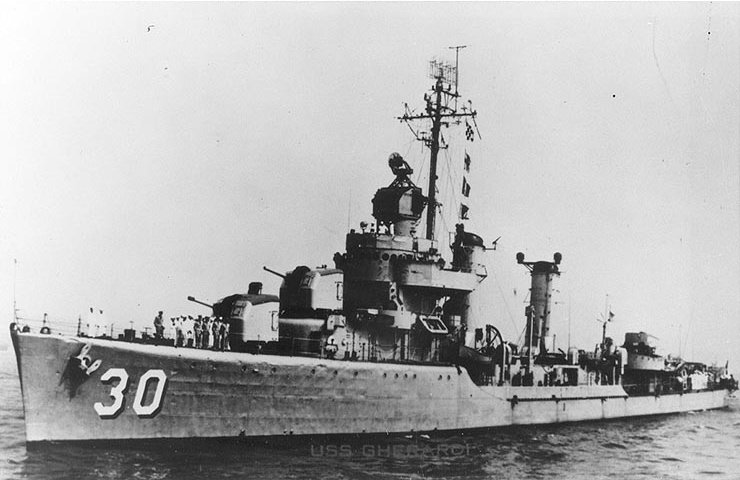
- USS Gherardi in minesweeper configuration

History

United States
- Name: Gherardi
- Namesake: Bancroft Gherardi
- Builder: Philadelphia Naval Shipyard
- Laid down: 16 September 1941
- Launched: 12 February 1942
- Commissioned: 15 September 1942
- Identification: DD-637
- Reclassified: DMS-30, 15 November 1944
- Decommissioned: 17 December 1955
- Stricken: 1 June 1971
- Fate: Sunk as target off Puerto Rico, 3 June 1973

General characteristics
- Class & type: Gleaves-class destroyer
- Displacement: 1,630 tons
- Length: 348 ft 3 in (106.15 m)
- Beam: 36 ft 1 in (11.00 m)
- Draft: 11 ft 10 in (3.61 m)
- Propulsion: 50,000 shp (37,000 kW); 4 boilers; 2 propellers
- Speed: 37.4 knots (69 km/h)
- Range: 6,500 nmi (12,000 km; 7,500 mi) at 12 kn (22 km/h; 14 mph)
- Complement: 16 officers, 260 enlisted
- Armament: 4 × 5 in (127 mm)/38 caliber DP guns; 4 × 40 mm (1.6 in) guns; 4 × 20 mm (0.79 in) AA guns, 5 × 21 in (533 mm) torpedo tubes (1x5; 5 Mark 15 torpedoes); 6 × depth charge projectors, 2 × depth charge tracks

USS Gherardi (DD-637/DMS-30), a Gleaves-class destroyer, is the only ship of the United States Navy to be named for Rear Admiral Bancroft Gherardi.

Gherardi was launched on 12 February 1942 by the Philadelphia Navy Yard, sponsored by Mrs. Christopher Robinson, granddaughter of Rear Admiral Bancroft Gherardi; and commissioned on 15 September 1942.

== Service history ==
=== Atlantic and Mediterranean service ===
In December 1942 Gherardi suffered fatalities in a storm. After trials and shakedown training out of Casco Bay, Maine and Newport, Rhode Island Gherardi departed Philadelphia 1 January 1943 making convoy escort voyages to Guantanamo Bay, Cuba, Port Arthur and Galveston, Texas, returning to New York on 7 February 1943. She departed New York on 15 February on what was to be the first of ten transatlantic convoys. Gherardi returned to New York from Casablanca on 14 April 1943. After a voyage to Newfoundland in May she departed Hampton Roads, Virginia on 8 June en route to the Mediterranean to become part of Admiral Kent Hewitt's Western Naval Task Force for the invasion of Sicily. Assigned the duty of protecting troop transports, she helped defeat many bombing attacks and was credited with shooting down one plane, suffering 11 near misses.

Gherardi saw her first surface action when late in July and early August she participated in several offensive sweeps along the northern coast of Sicily, and around the port of Palermo. On the night of 3/4 August the destroyers USS Gherardi and USS Rhind were making a night offensive sweep along the coast, when at 22:15, a few miles off Cape Calava, they picked up a small convoy consisting of one of the German MFP lighters escorted by two Italian motor torpedo boats. At a range of 4,000 yards (3,700 m), the destroyers illuminated the convoy with star shells and opened up with their main batteries. The lighter blew up at 22:25 and one of the escorting boats (MS 66) was sunk; the other (MS 63) fired at least one torpedo, which missed. It was later found that the German lighter had been loaded with land mines.

Gherardi returned to New York 22 August 1943 and commenced a series of fast convoy escort voyages to Northern Ireland and England, touching at Belfast and Derry, Northern Ireland and Swansea, Wales. She returned to New York from her last voyage on 13 February 1944. After intensive training out of Casco Bay, Maine, Gherardi made a voyage to Gibraltar with a large scouting force between 23 March and 22 April 1944. On 8 May 1944 Gherardi departed New York en route to Northern Ireland for rehearsals for the invasion of Normandy. On the morning of D-Day, 6 June 1944 she maneuvered into the fire support area as a unit of Admiral Don P. Moon's Assault Force "U" for Utah Beach. She delivered calls from fire-control parties ashore clearing the way for troops by prompt and accurate fire on railroads, houses, shore batteries and other targets. This drew dangerous return fire and she had one hot duel during the afternoon. Having expended all her ammunition, Gherardi was forced to retire that afternoon to Plymouth, England, to replenish.

Returning to Utah Beach, Gherardi was assigned screening duty. This lasted until 25 June when she joined Admiral Morton Deyo's bombardment Task Force 129 in the support of the First Army assault on Cherbourg, France.

Departing the Normandy area 18 July 1944 Gherardi steamed to Malta where she joined a British–American escort carrier task force which trained for the invasion of Southern France on 15 August. On 9 August 1944 Gherardi rendezvoused with the carrier strike group and maneuvered into the launching areas. For two weeks Gherardi screened the carriers while strike after strike was made in support of the invasion. Southern France now secured, Gherardi departed for the states, reaching New York 16 September. Immediately work started to convert her to a high speed minesweeper.

=== Pacific service ===
On 15 November 1944 Gherardi classification changed to DMS-30. After many tests and calibrations she joined Mine Division 60 and steamed to the Pacific, touching at San Diego, Pearl Harbor, and Eniwetok. She reached Ulithi in early March. Departing Ulithi she proceeded to Okinawa where she arrived 25 March 1945. Here Gherardi participated in minesweeping operations prior to the invasion of Okinawa on 1 April under the overall command of Admiral Raymond A. Spruance, Commander Fifth Fleet. After the initial assault she screened the heavier surface fire support units and rendered assistance as needed. For three months of continuous screening duty she fought off many suicide planes. Near the end of the battle for Okinawa the versatile Gherardi participated in day shore bombardment and night illumination of the southern coast of the island, contributing to the advance of the troops.

Early in July Gherardi became flagship of Commander Mine Division 60, then took up duty as fire-support ship for a group of smaller fleet minesweepers in the China Sea. This duty lasted until 19 August 1945 when she joined the Third Fleet and went to work clearing Tokyo Bay preparatory to the final surrender and occupation of Japan. The surrender documents having been signed on board the battleship Missouri on 2 September 1945, Gherardi began a series of high speed minesweeping operations to help clear the waters around southern Kyūshū and Korea. This duty continued until 5 December 1945 when she departed Sasebo, Kyūshū en route to San Diego where she arrived 23 December.

=== 1946–1955 ===
Three days later Gherardi departed San Diego via the Panama Canal for Norfolk, Virginia, arriving 9 January 1946. She now became a unit of Mine Division 6, Atlantic Fleet and based at Norfolk until June when her home port changed to Naval Station Charleston, South Carolina. From June 1946 until October 1947 Gherardi operated out of Charleston when she sailed for Bermuda for towing duty. Afterward she steamed to Newfoundland for cold weather training in Placentia Bay, returning to Charleston 29 November. Gherardi spent the remainder of the year at Charleston. In 1948 Gherardi continued to base out of Charleston, keeping busy with minesweeping exercises and steaming to Newfoundland again in November for cold weather training.

On 3 January 1949 Gherardi departed Charleston for her first tour with the Sixth Fleet in the Mediterranean She returned to Charleston on 2 April. After a visit to Port-au-Prince, Haiti, in May and a trip to New London in June Gherardi went in for overhaul, then to Guantanamo Bay for type training. For the next two years Gherardi conducted operations up and down the eastern seaboard and in the Caribbean, participating in Atlantic Fleet Exercise Operation Observant off Vieques, Puerto Rico then on to Onslow Beach, North Carolina for amphibious exercises.

On 8 January 1952 Gherardi got underway from Charleston for her second tour with Sixth Fleet returning to the States 26 June. Two months later, she steamed out of Charleston again, this time to take part in NATO Exercise Operation Mainbrace in the North Atlantic. With the exception of duty with the Sixth Fleet, Gherardi conducted type training and held exercises out of Charleston and along the eastern seaboard for the next two years.

In January and February 1955 Gherardi took part in Operation Springboard in the Caribbean, and in March and April she participated in Atlantic Fleet Exercise "LANTMINEX". On 15 July 1955, Gherardi was redesignated DD-637. Shortly thereafter she went into the Charleston Naval Shipyard for preinactivation overhaul where she was decommissioned 17 December 1955. She entered the Atlantic Reserve Fleet there.

Gherardi was stricken from the Naval Vessel Register on 1 June 1971, and sunk as target off Puerto Rico on 3 June 1973.

Gherardi received five battle stars for World War II service.
