= Palazzo Gherardi =

Building in Florence, Italy

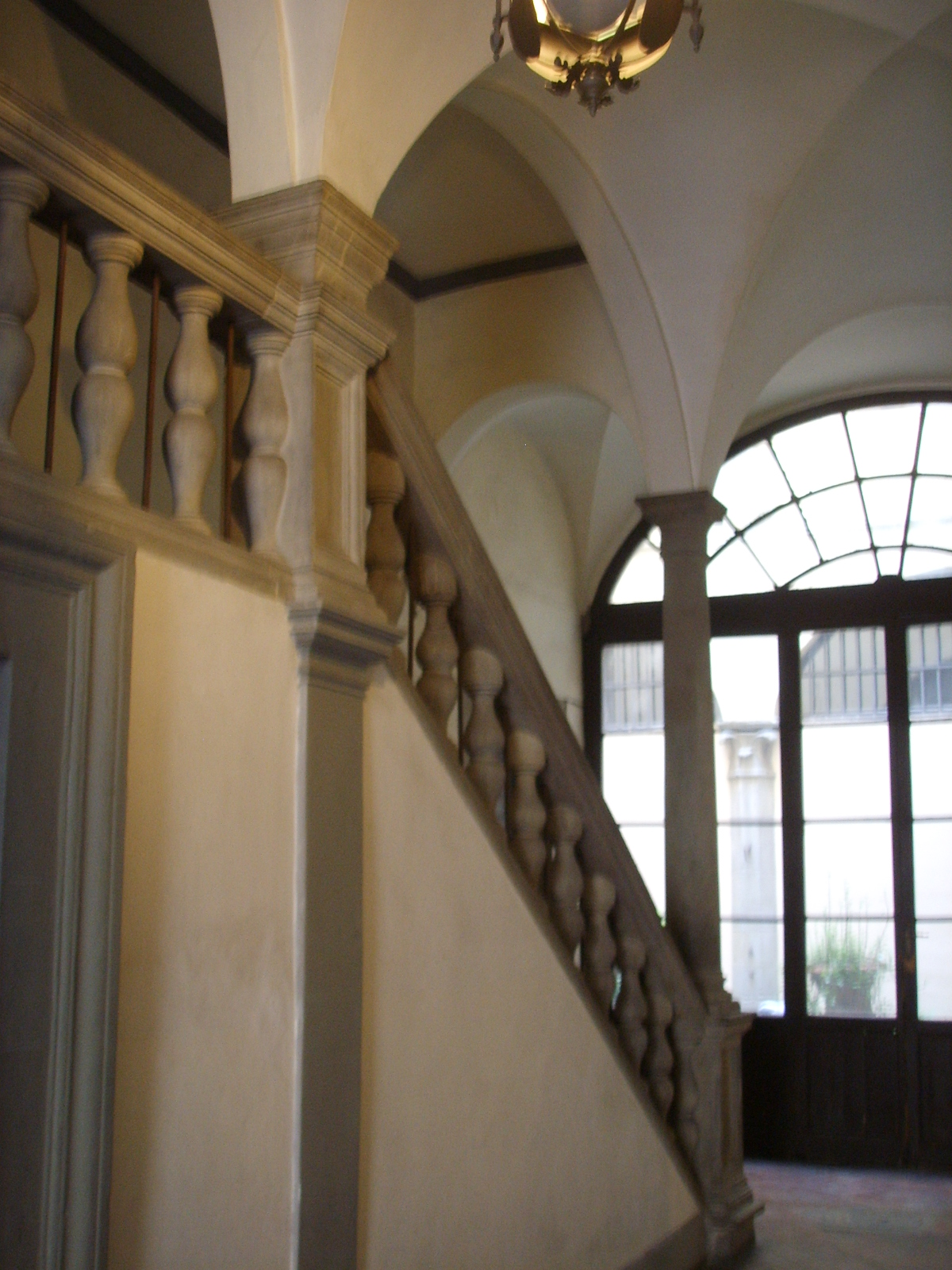
The stone staircase leading to the second floor and the door leading to the courtyard

Palazzo Gherardi is a 15th-century building in the Santa croce quarter of Florence, Tuscany, in central Italy. Its main façade is on Via Ghibellina 88, while to the right it faces Via dei Pepi.

== Description ==
Though at present there are at least four doors, each with its own street number, historically there are only two entrances: the main one in the centre, leading to the upper stories and to the cellars, and the tradesmen's entrance to the right. Along Via Ghibellina, at ground level, besides the doors, there are a series of square stone windows with grills. There is another service entrance on Via dei Pepi, as well as what seems to be a modern door, now closed by a glass pane, and an artisan's workshop. Both the first and second floors are marked by belt course and are almost entirely occupied by serried, large, arched windows, ten on each floor. This notwithstanding, the design is sober, even austere, as is typical of XV century Florentine architecture.

Inside there are two staircases leading to the upper floors, as well as two doors leading to the cellars, to the right at the rear there is a door that leads into two interconnected large rooms. The main staircase, leading to the second floor occupied by private flats, has a stone handrail. At the back of the entrance there is a courtyard with blocked arches, dating to the end of the XIV century, which obviously constituted a loggia connected to the tradesmen's entrance. There is a small loggia giving on to the courtyard. The Gherardi coat of arms is still visible on the back wall of the courtyard.

Besides private habitations on the second floor, the building also houses the Florentine Campus of the Sapienza; Unitelma La Sapienza University of Rome and the Istituto di Lingua e Cultura Italiana Michelangelo on the first floor.

The building is cited in the 1901 compendium of the Direzione Generale delle Antichità e Belle Arti, as a monumental building, classified as a national artistic monument.

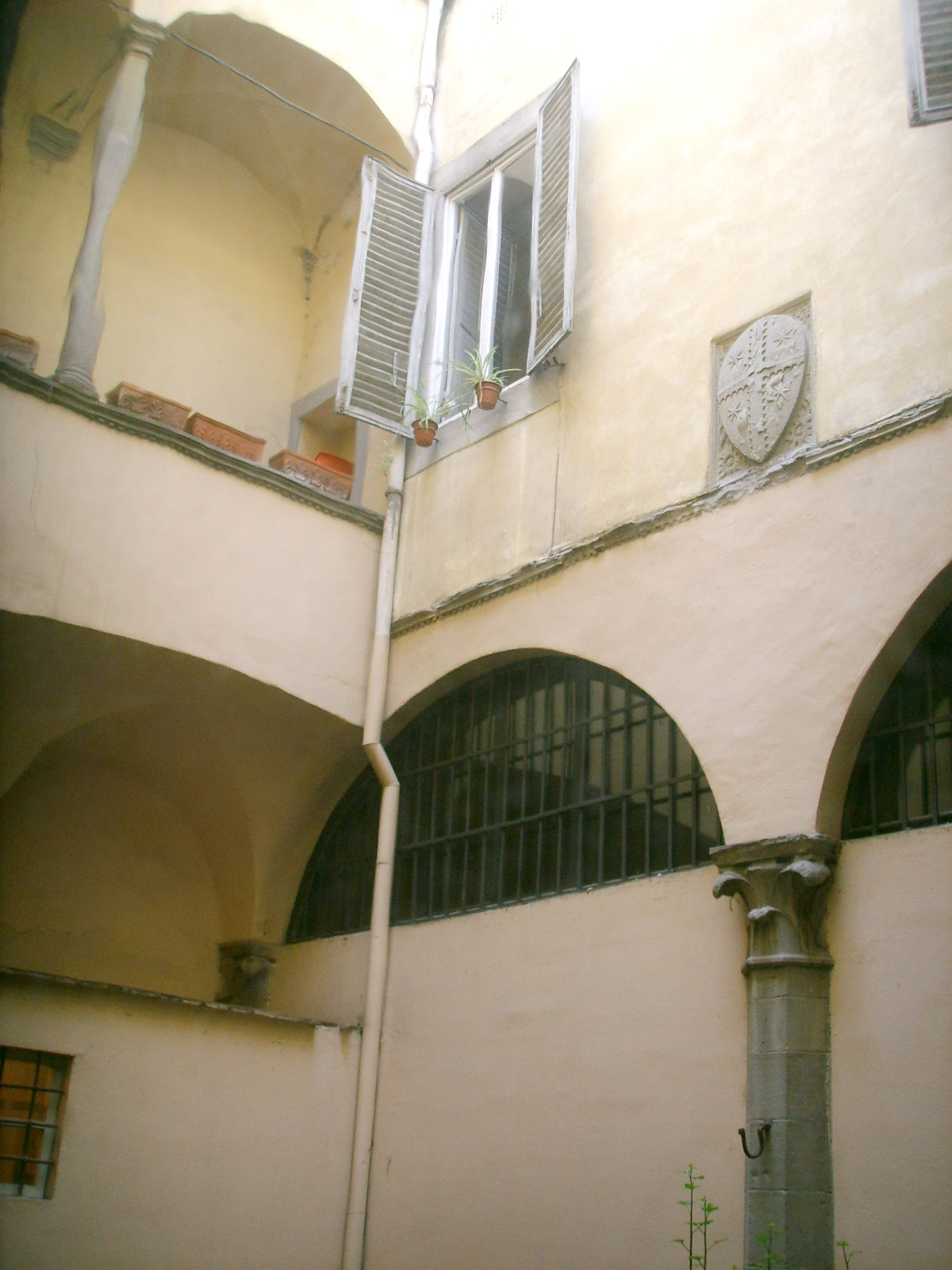
The courtyard of Palazzo Gerardi, showing the first floor loggia to the right and displaying the Gherardi coat of arms on the back wall.

== Bibliography ==
- Guido Carocci, Firenze scomparsa. Ricordi storico-artistici, Firenze, Galletti e Cocci, 1897, p. 142;
- Ministero della Pubblica Istruzione (Direzione Generale delle Antichità e Belle Arti), Elenco degli Edifizi Monumentali in Italia, Roma, Tipografia ditta Ludovico Cecchini, 1902, p. 254
- Walther Limburger, Die Gebäude von Florenz: Architekten, Strassen und Plätze in alphabetischen Verzeichnissen, Lipsia, F.A. Brockhaus, 1910, n. 285;
- Walther Limburger, Le costruzioni di Firenze, traduzione, aggiornamenti bibliografici e storici a cura di Mazzino Fossi, Firenze, Soprintendenza ai Monumenti di Firenze, 1968 (dattiloscritto presso la Biblioteca della Soprintendenza per i Beni Architettonici e per il Paesaggio per le province di Firenze Pistoia e Prato, 4/166)., n. 285;
- Piero Bargellini, Ennio Guarnieri, Le strade di Firenze, 4 voll., Firenze, Bonechi, 1977–1978, II, 1977, p. 31;
- Claudio Paolini, Case e palazzi nel quartiere di Santa Croce a Firenze, Firenze, Paideia, 2008, p. 96, n. 132;
- Claudio Paolini, Architetture fiorentine. Case e palazzi nel quartiere di Santa Croce, Firenze, Paideia, 2009, pp. 154–155, n. 202.
