= Museo Storico Navale =

Naval history museum in Castello, Venice, Italy

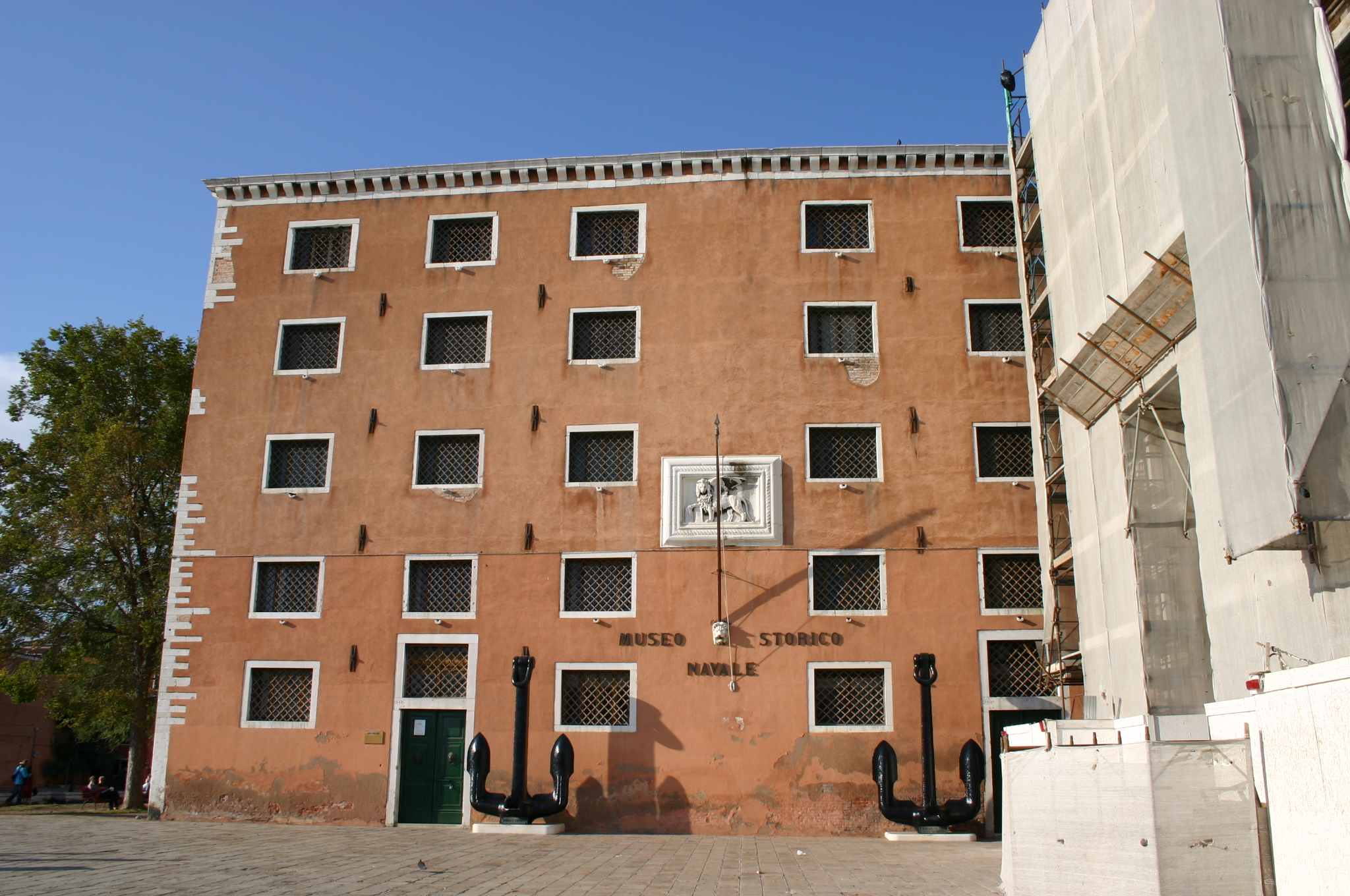
- The entrance to the Museo Storico Navale
- Established: 1919
- Location: Castello, Venice
- Coordinates: 45.43275°N 12.34997°E
- Type: Naval history
- Website: Museo Storico Navale

The Museo Storico Navale is a naval history museum located in the Castello district of Venice, near the Venetian Arsenal. The museum was established by the Regia Marina (the Italian Royal Navy) in 1919. Its collections include items relating to the naval and maritime history of Italy, and it has a large number of ship models and weapons on display.

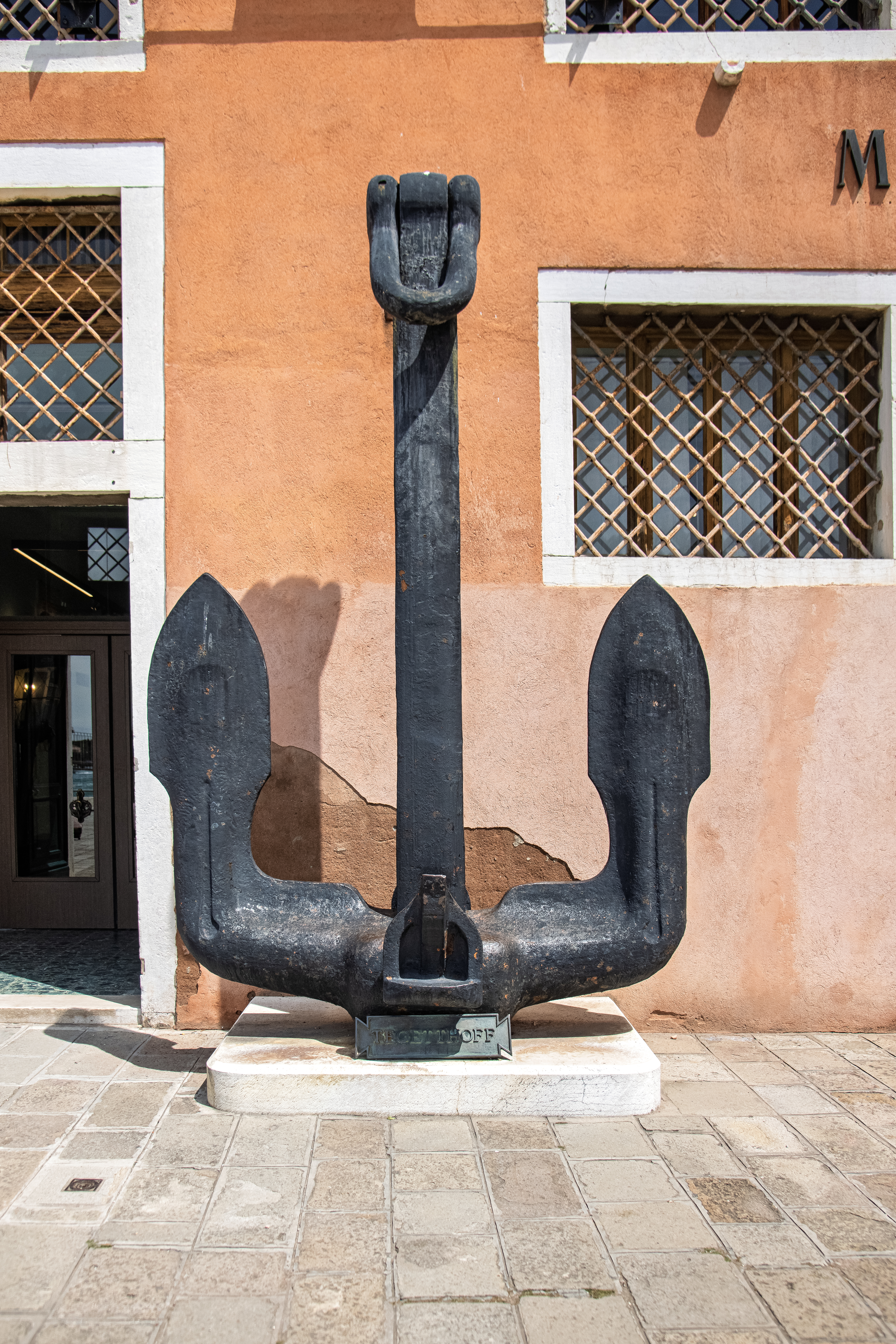
The Tegetthoff anchor. Tegetthoff was an Austro-Hungarian battleship.

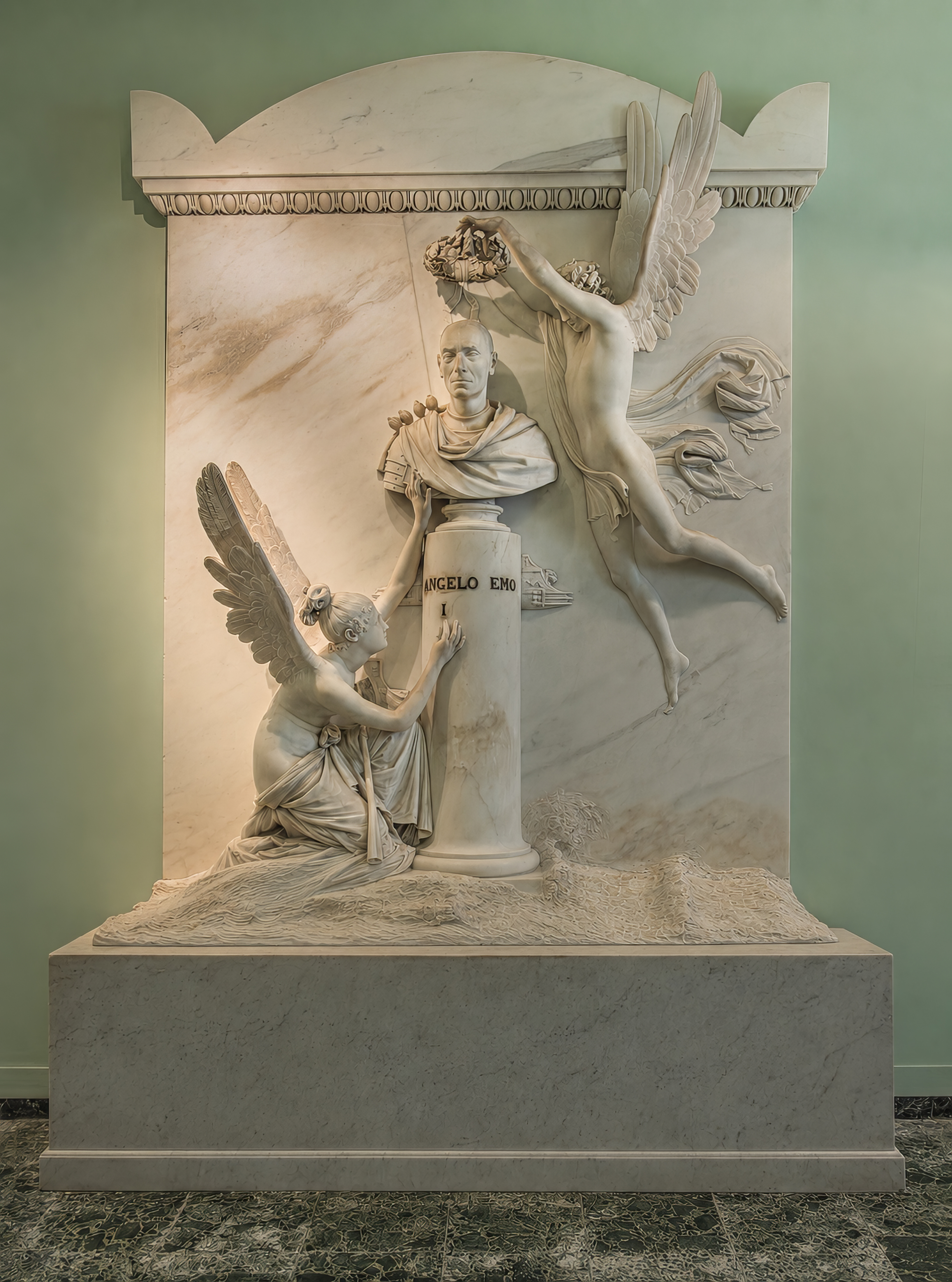
Entrance : Monumento All'Ammiraglio Angelo Emo by Antonio Canova.

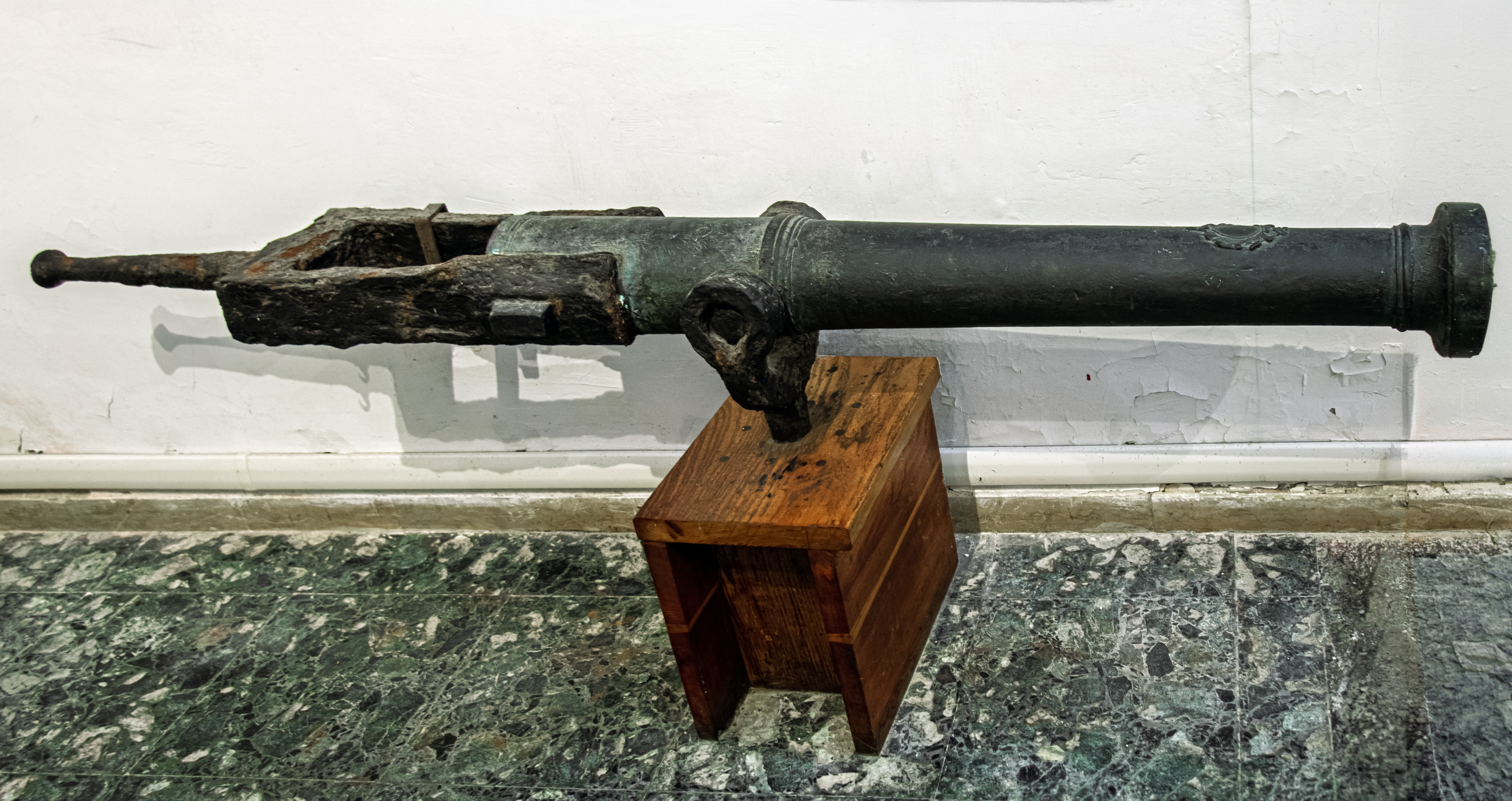
Sailing gun of 9 pounds in bronze and iron, used on military and merchant ships between the 16th and 17th centuries. Found off the Lido of Venice.

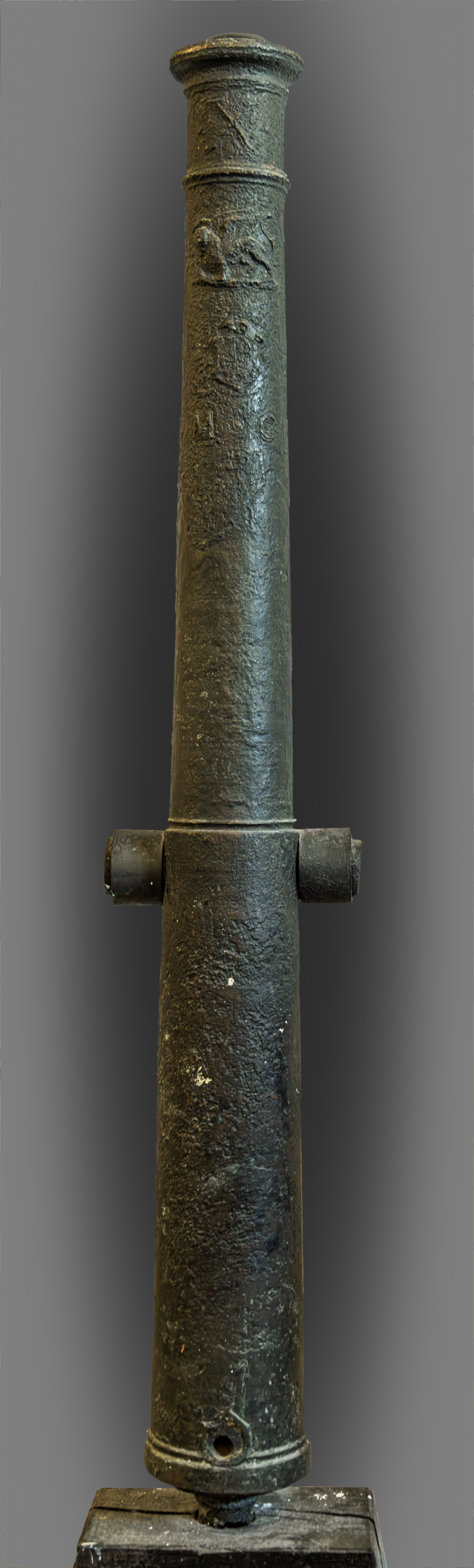
16th-century Venetian canon - Work by Marco di Conti.

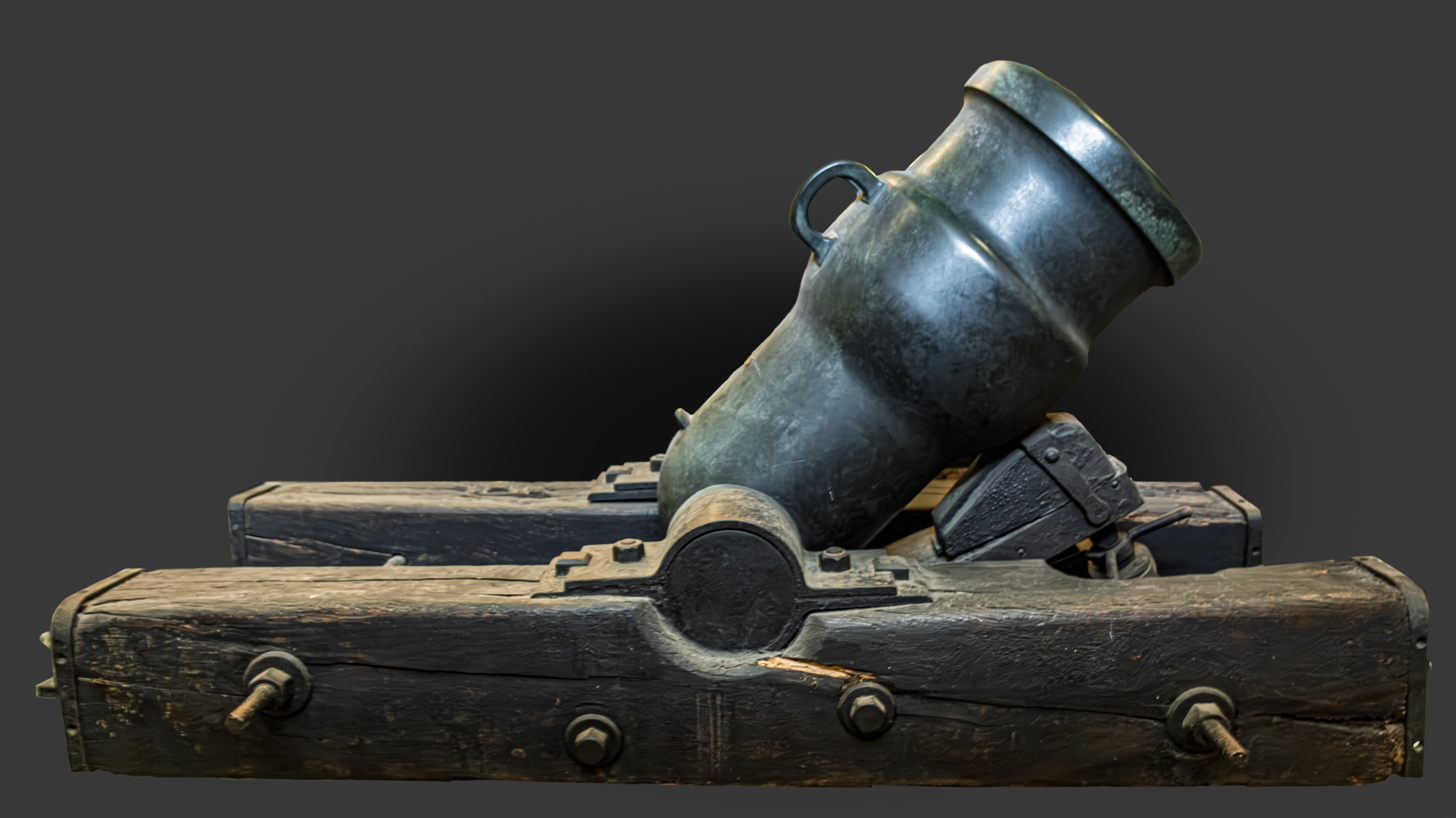
Turkish bronze mortar, side view

120 - Pounder culverin with the muzzle cut 16th century; Originating from the fortress of Famagusta.

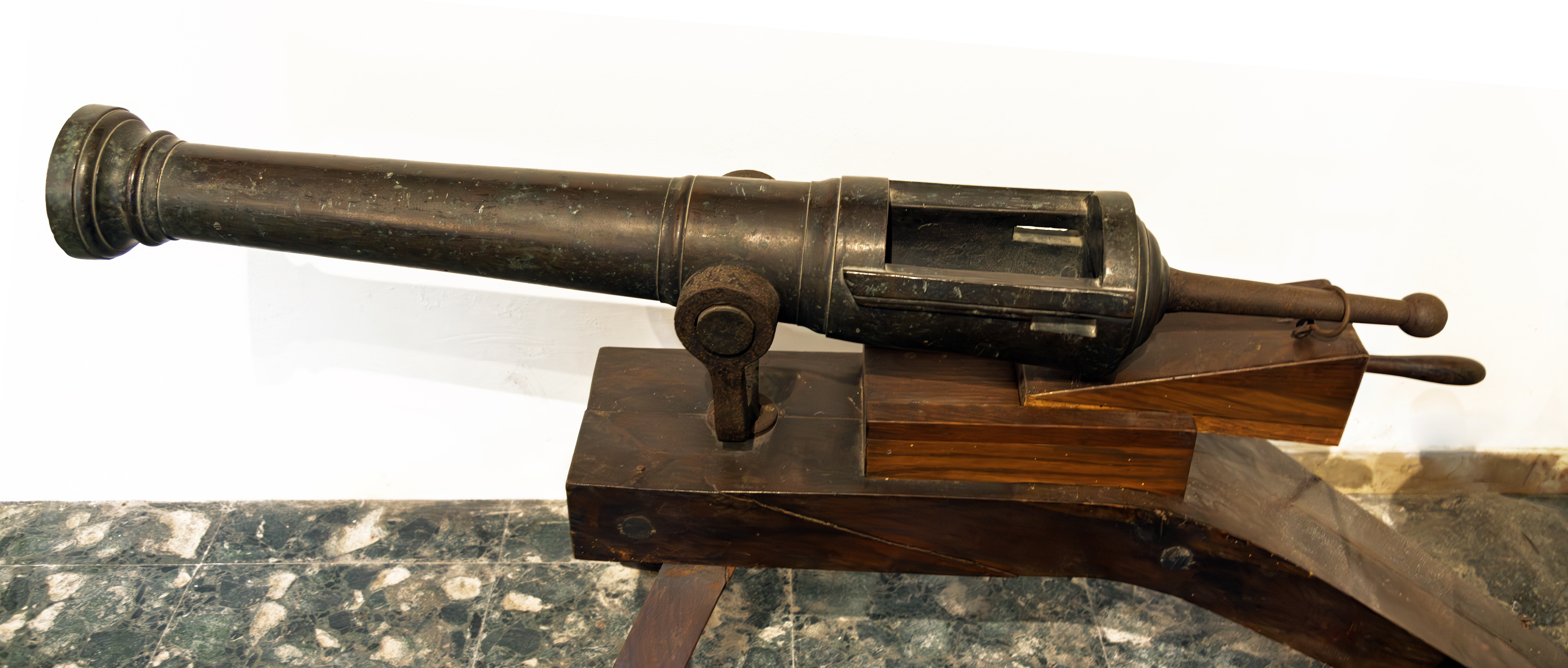
12-Pounder, breech-loading fork gun, to launch stone cannonballs. 16th centuries

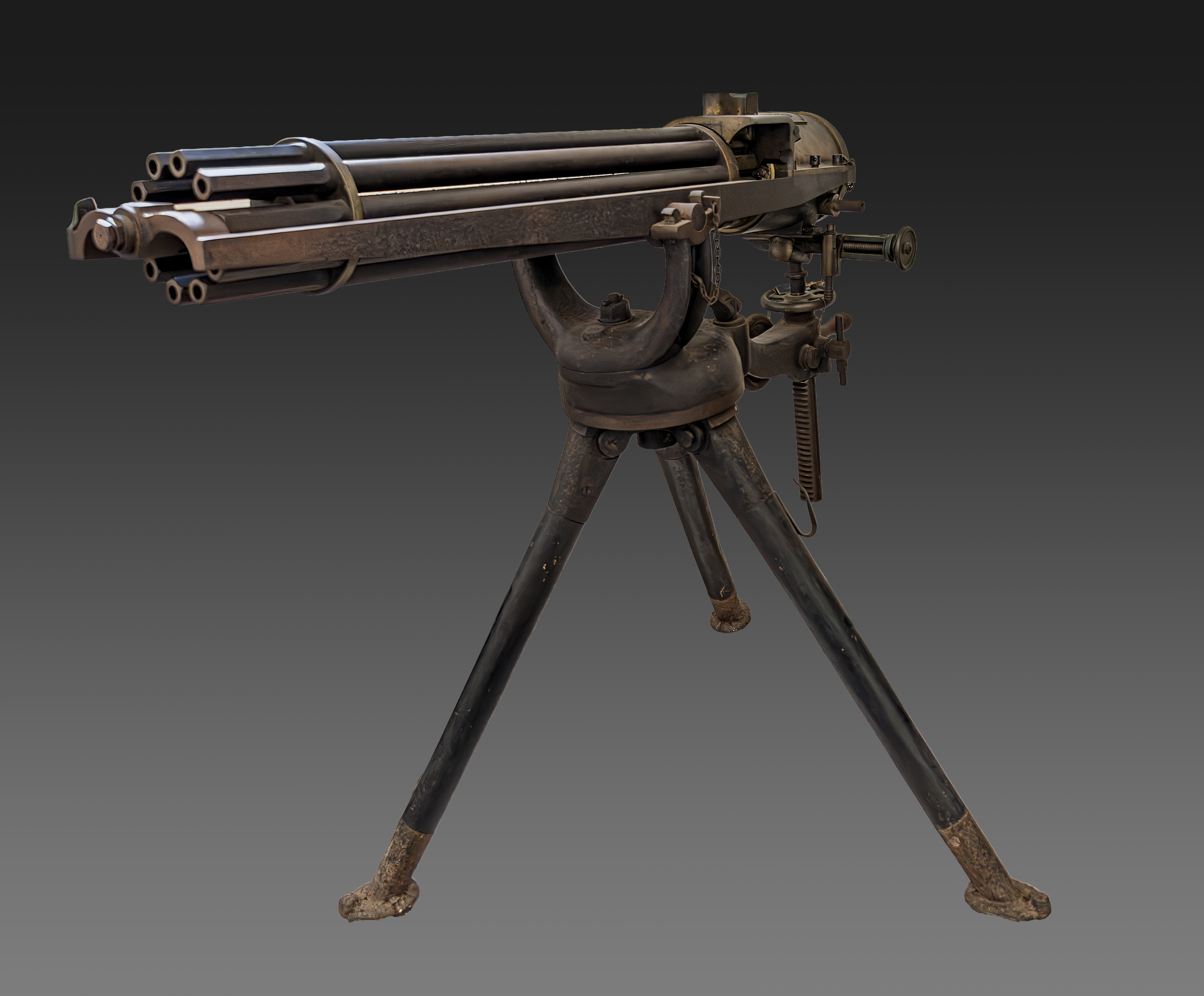
10-barrel machine gun.

35 mm Trench Gun (World war I).

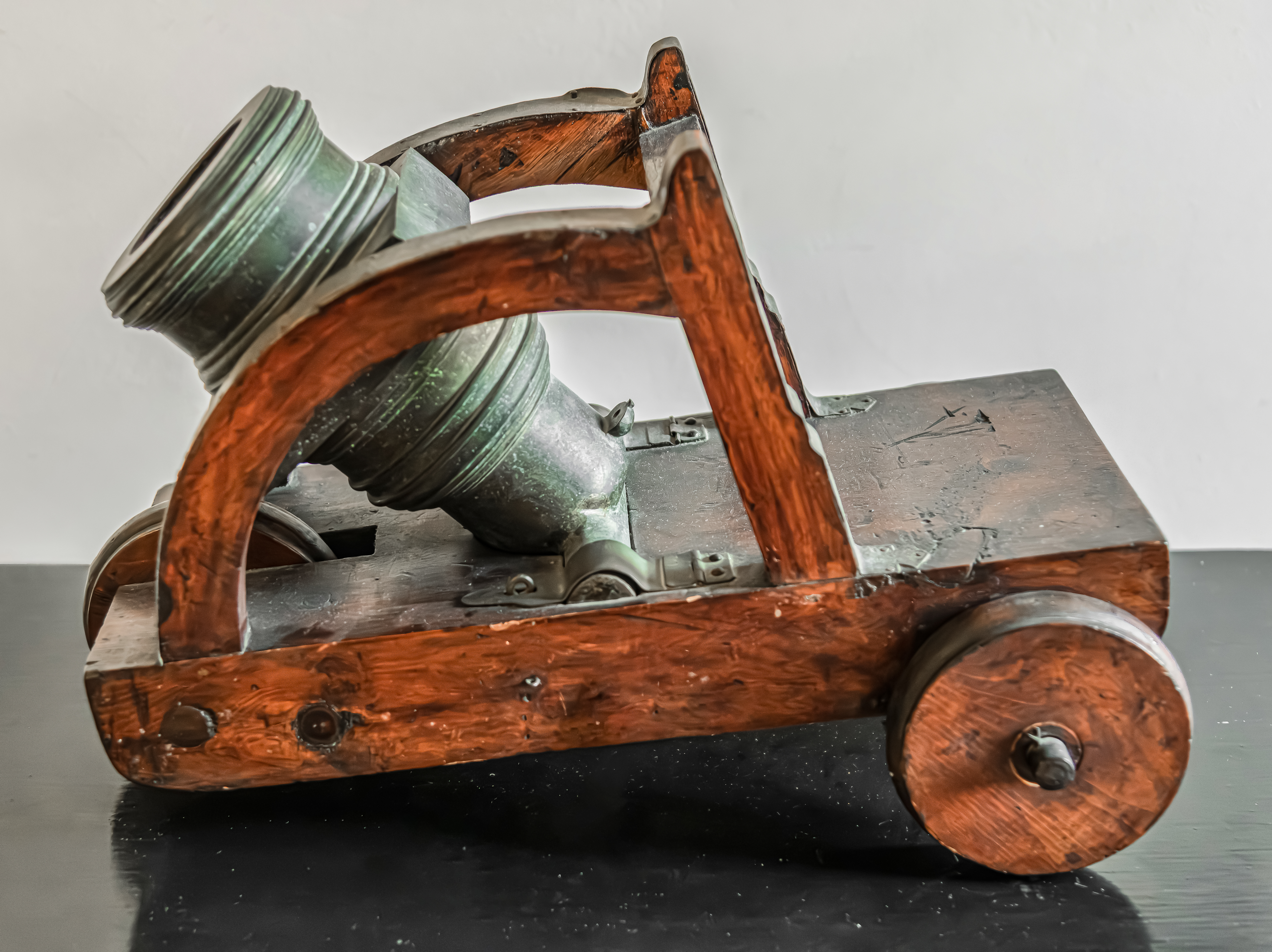
Model of mortar of the XVIIth century

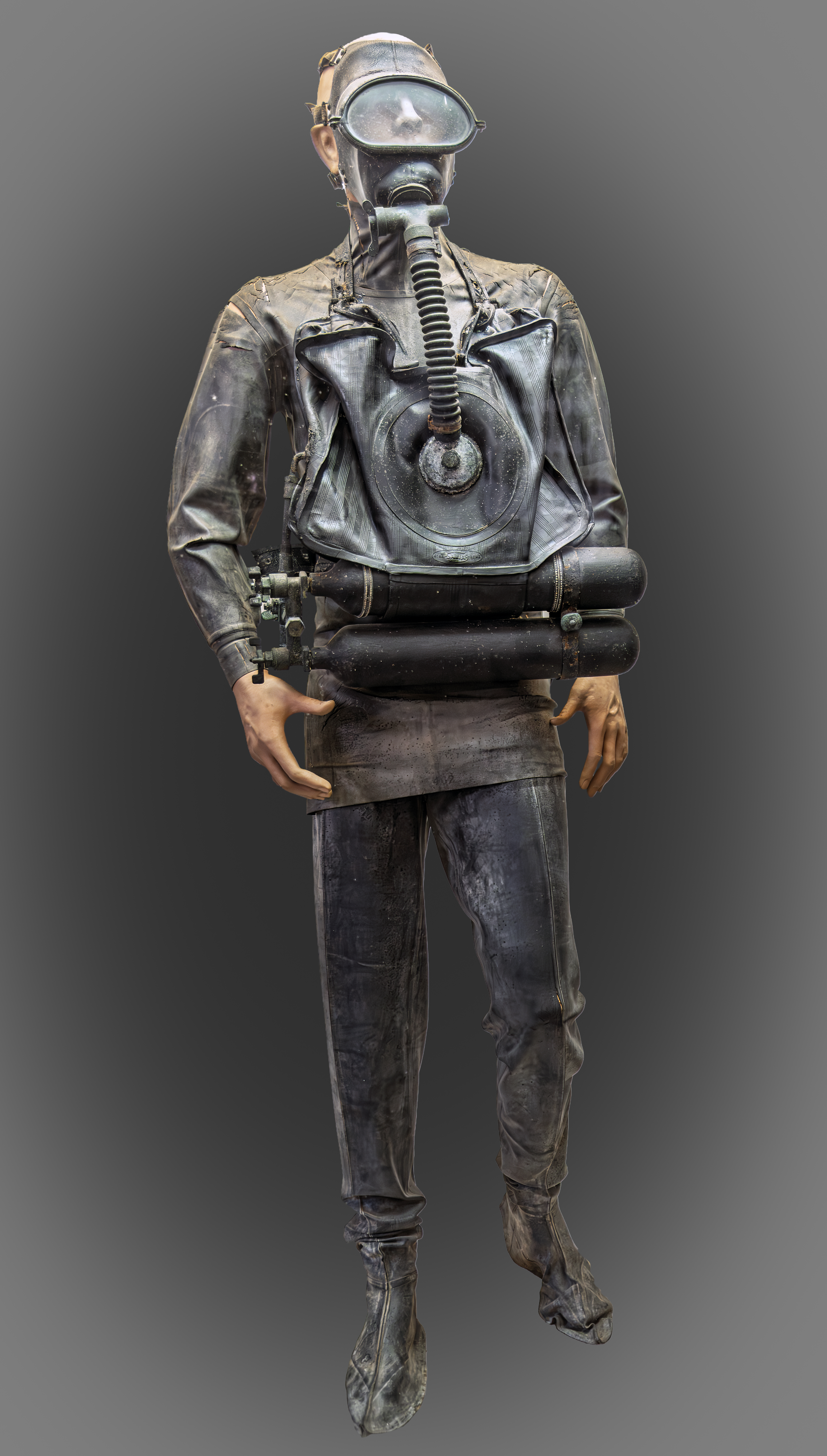
World War II - Combat swimmer's equipment.
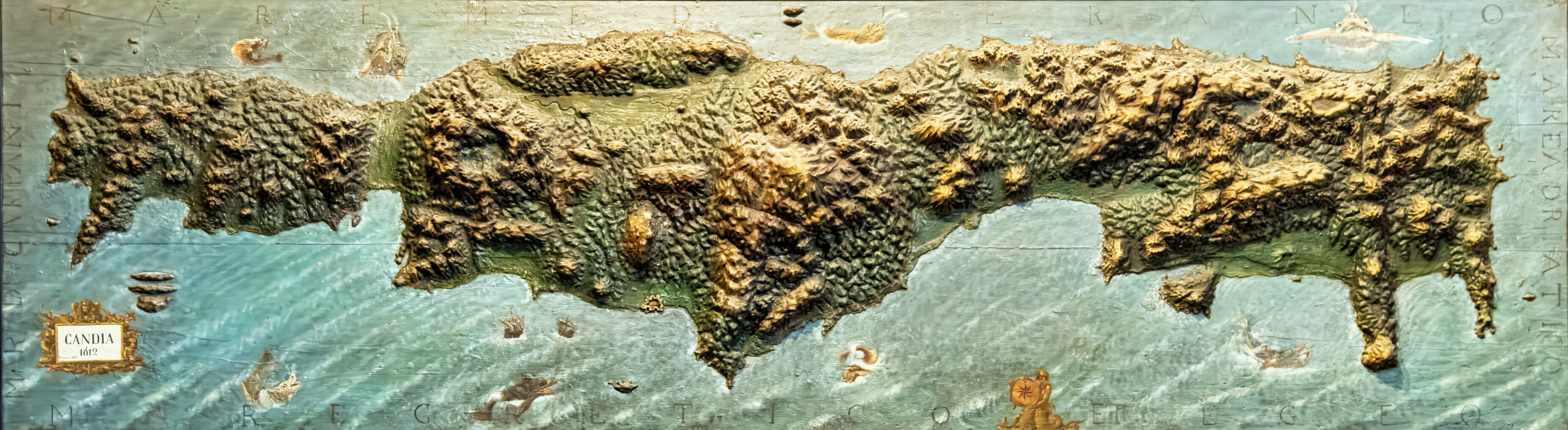
Island of Crete

The town of Zante.

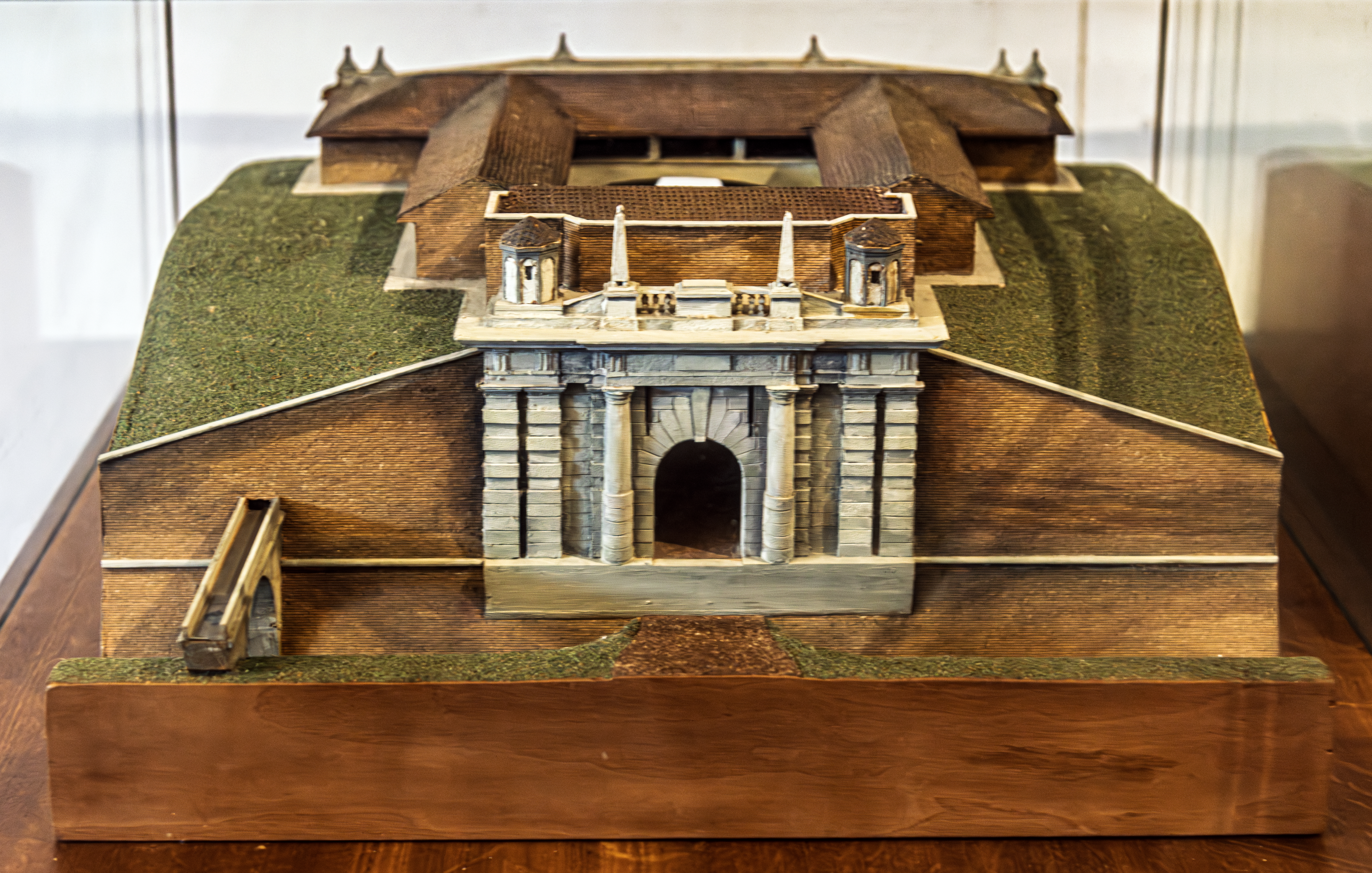
Palmanova - Porta Udine
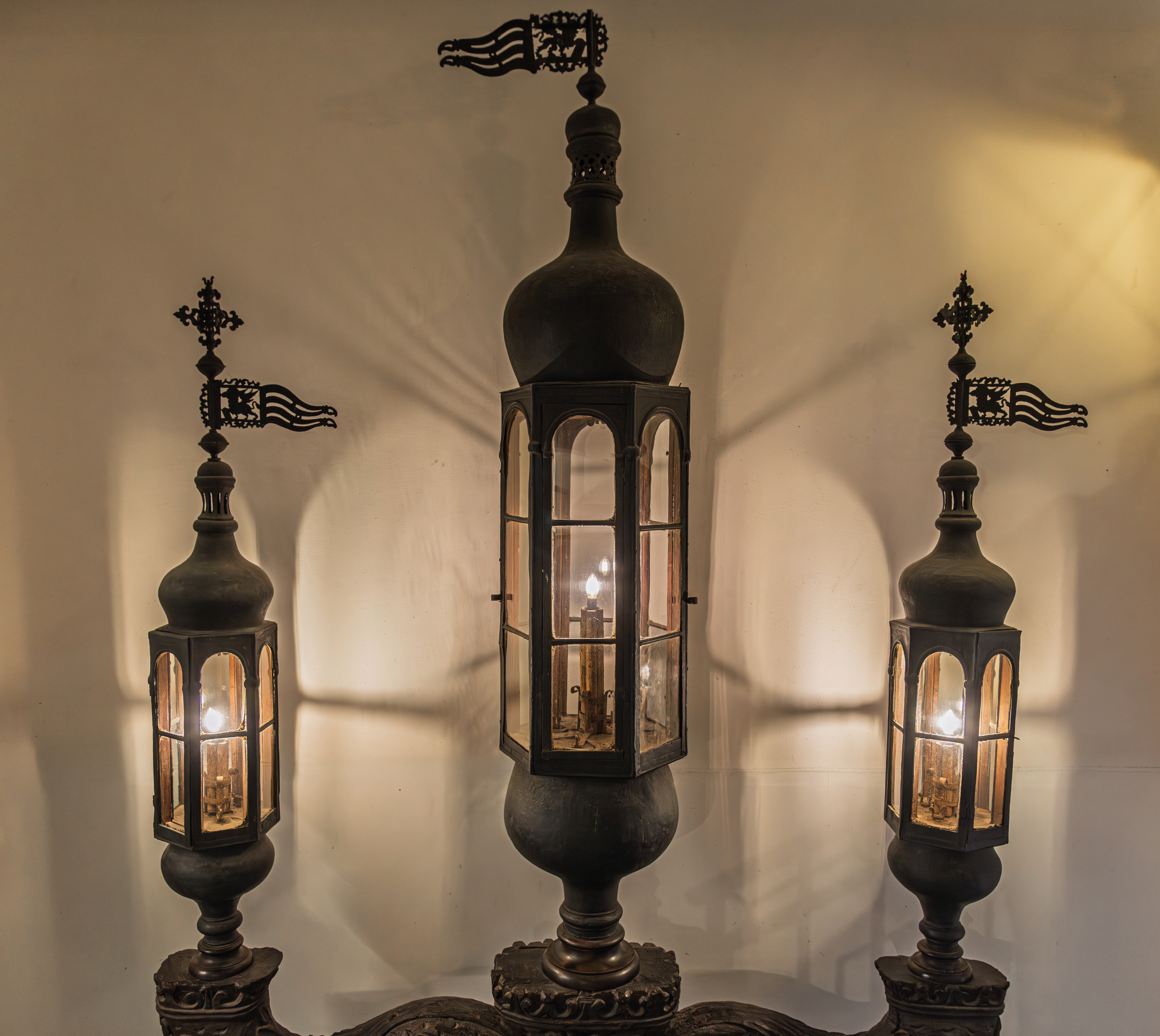
Lantern from a 16th-century Venetian galley

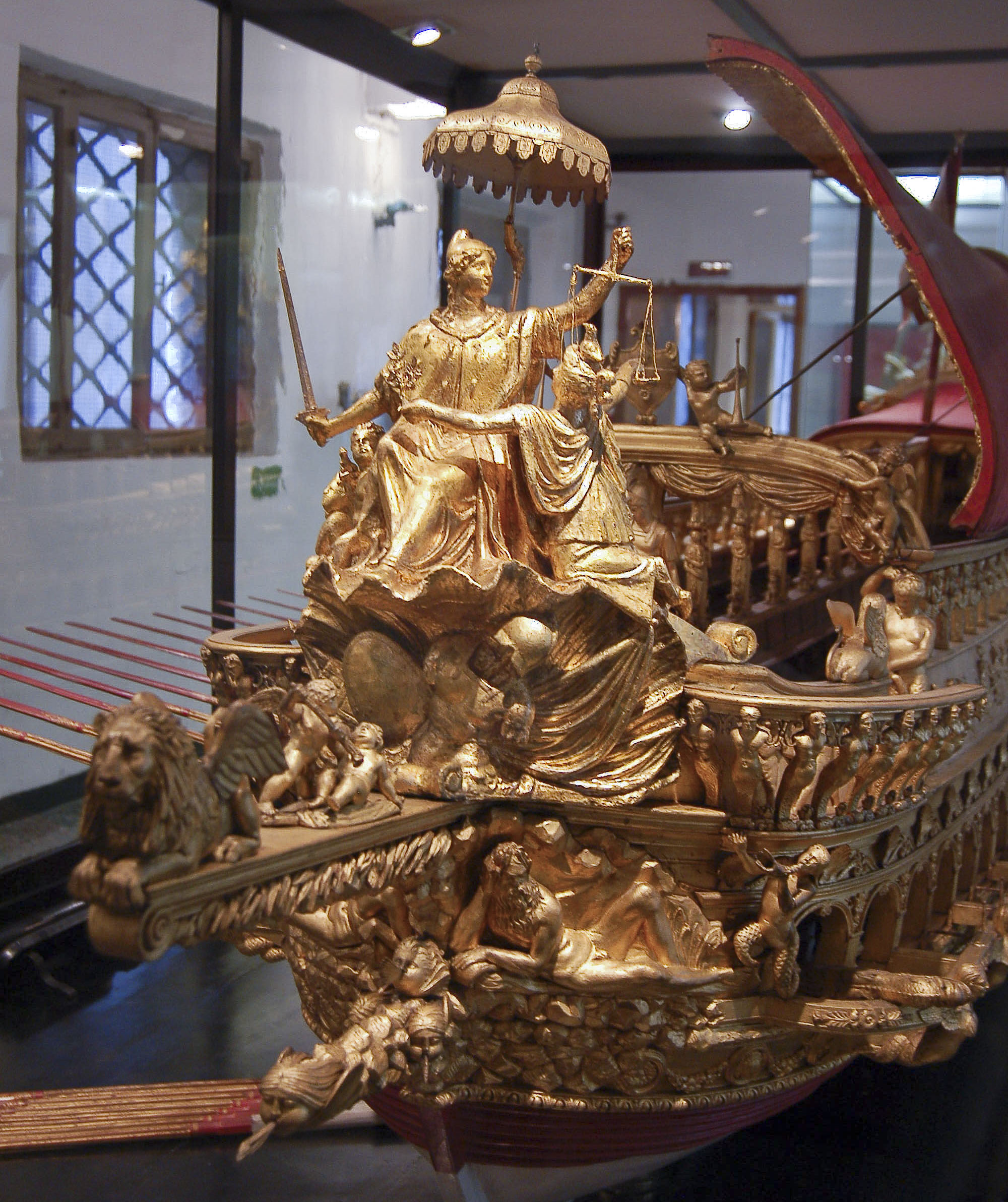
Model of the Bucentaur (Venetian ship).

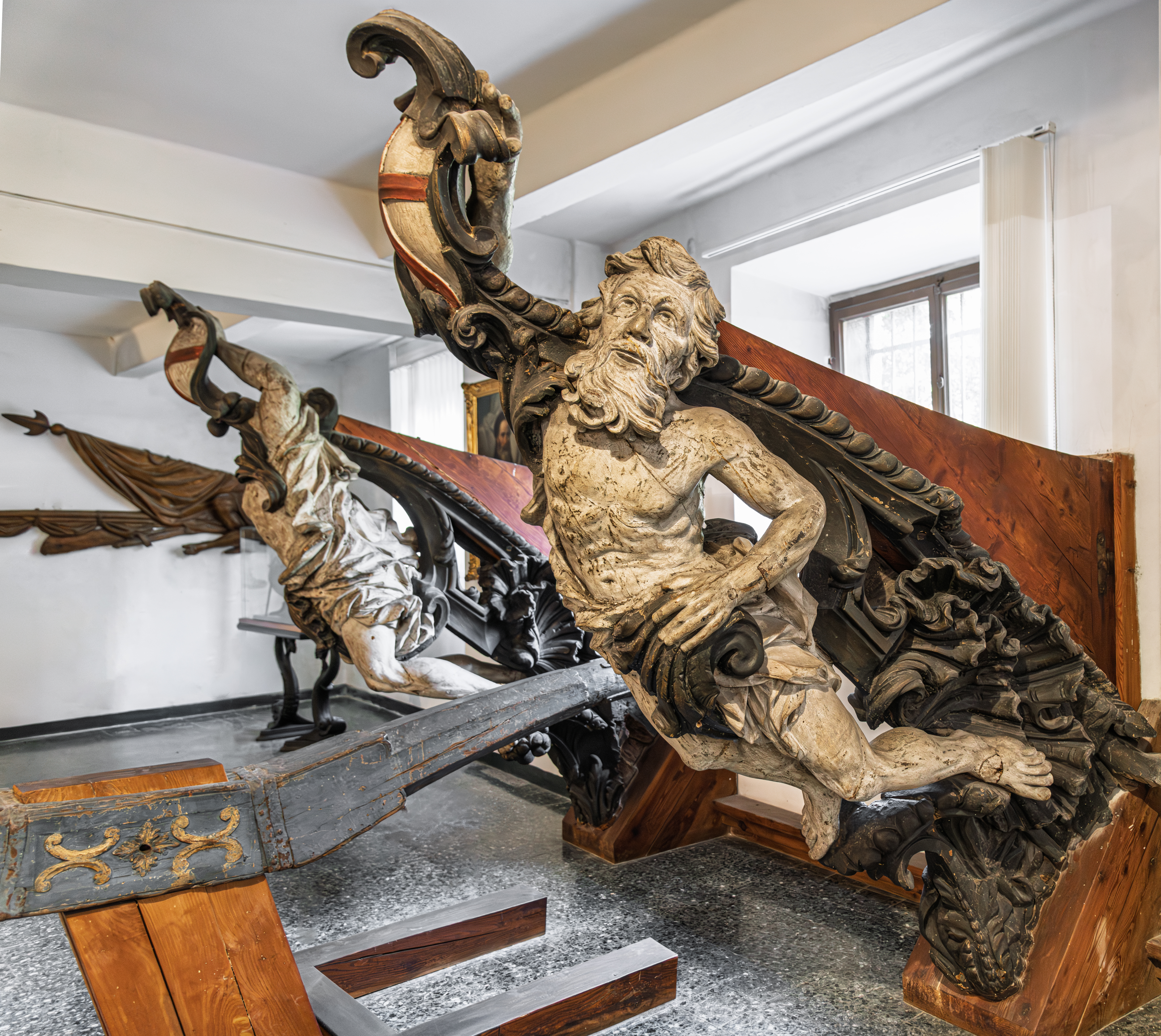
Terminal decorations on the sides of a Genoese galley (18th century)

Sculptures of the flagship bastard galley Francesco Morosini, 1684

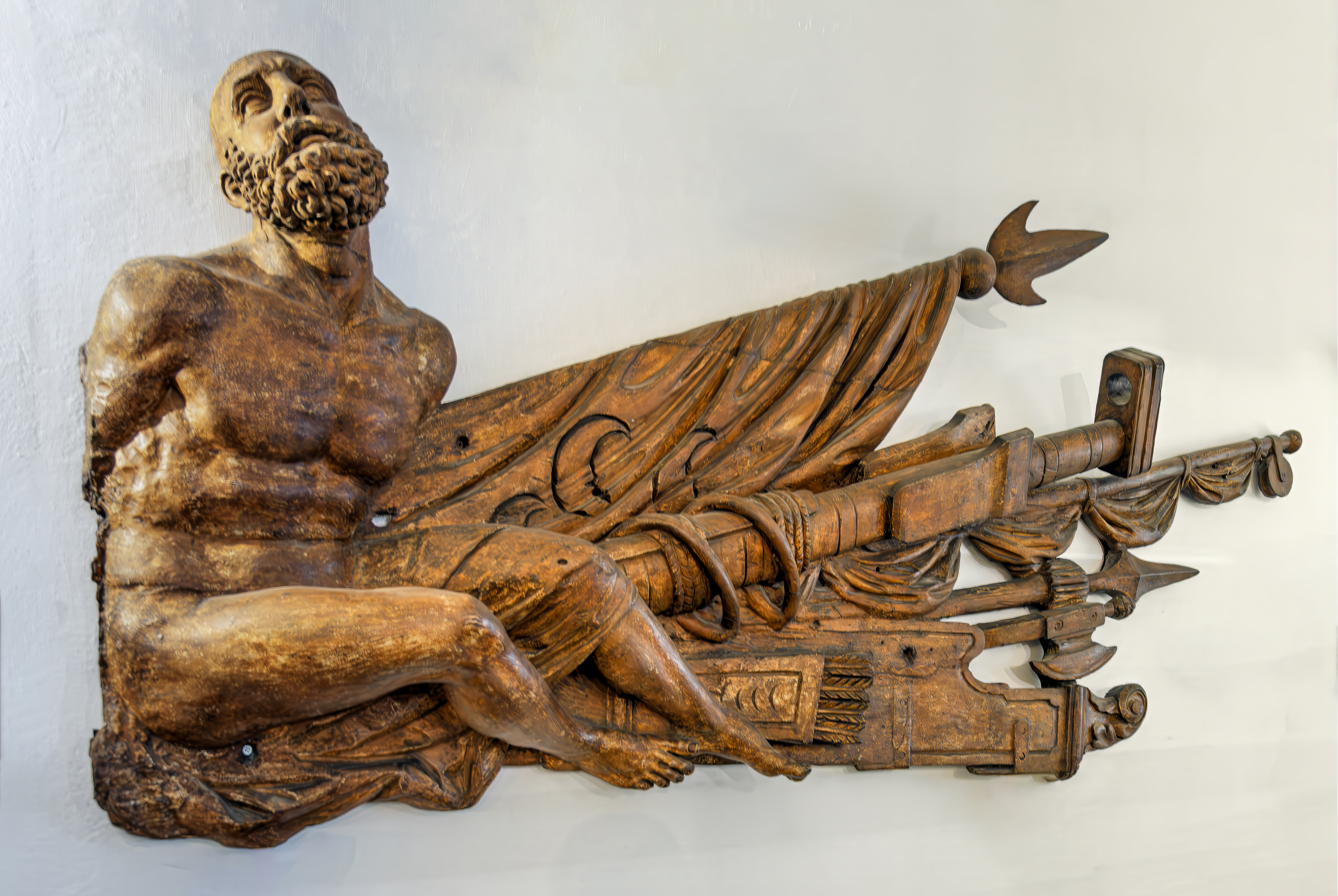
Sculptures of the flagship bastard galley Francesco Morosini, 1684

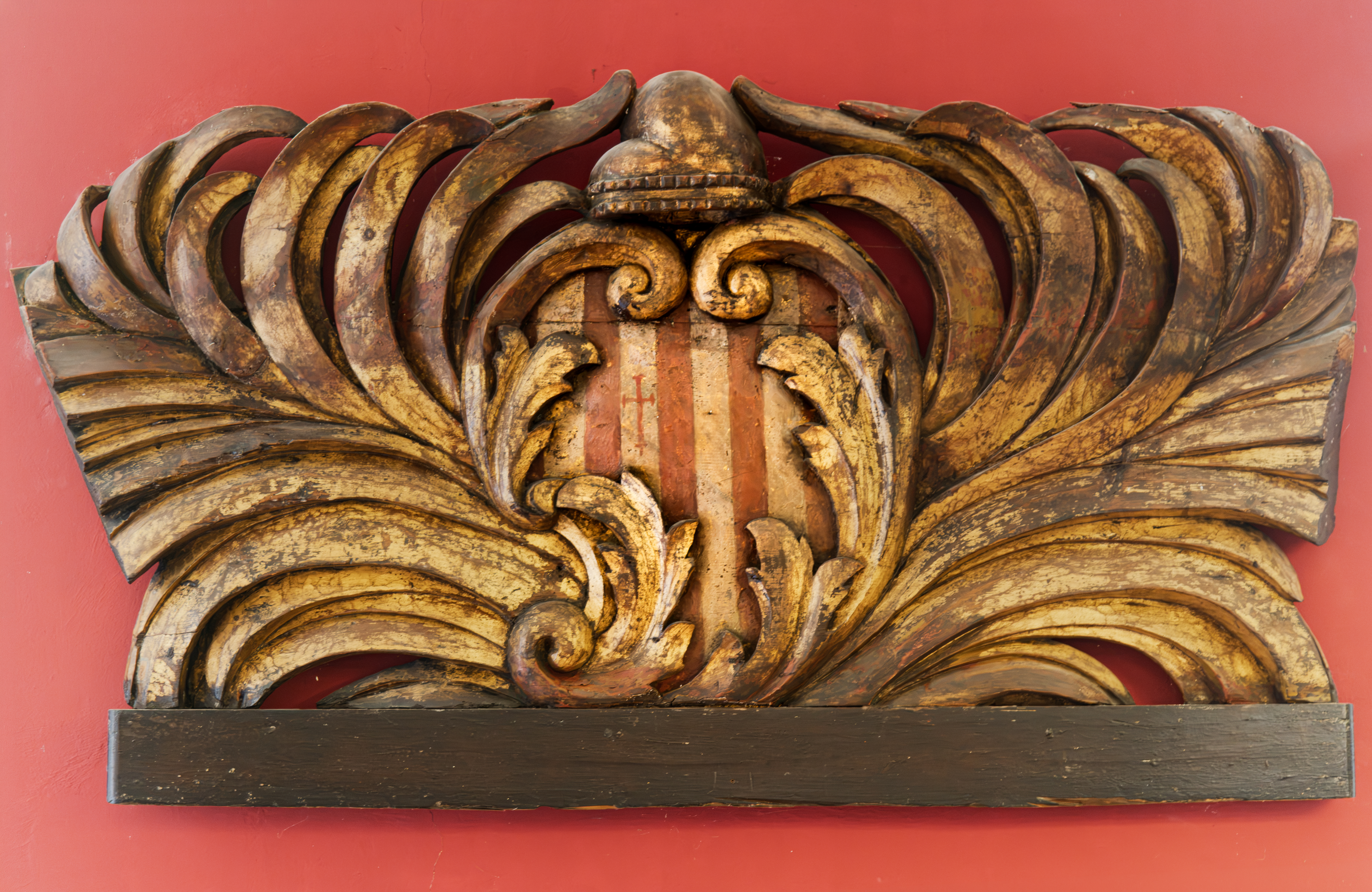
Balcony of a Venetian galley, bearing the Grimani family coat of arms (17th century)

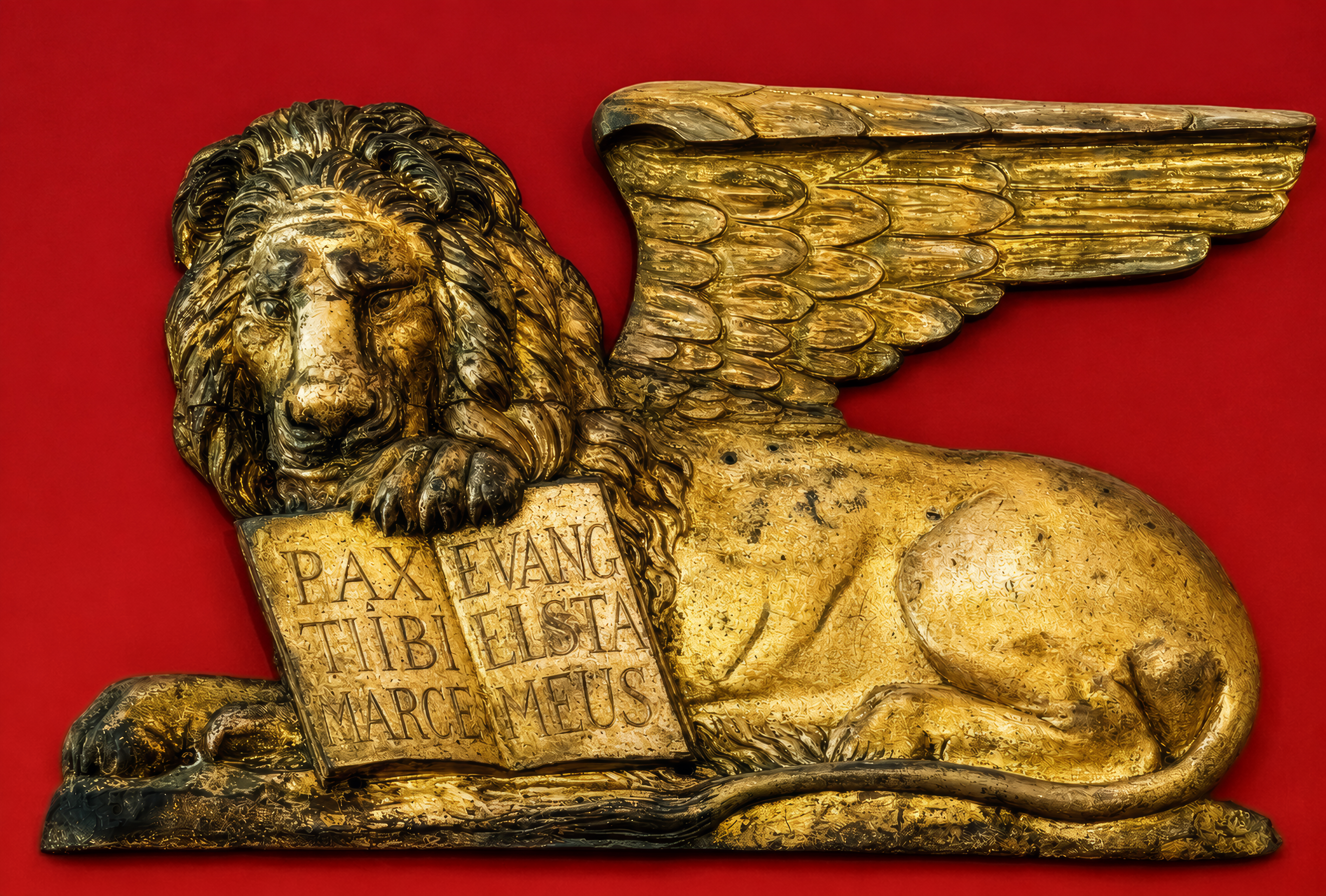
Leone Marciano, formerly the stern ornament of the brigantine ‘San Marco’ – (18th century)

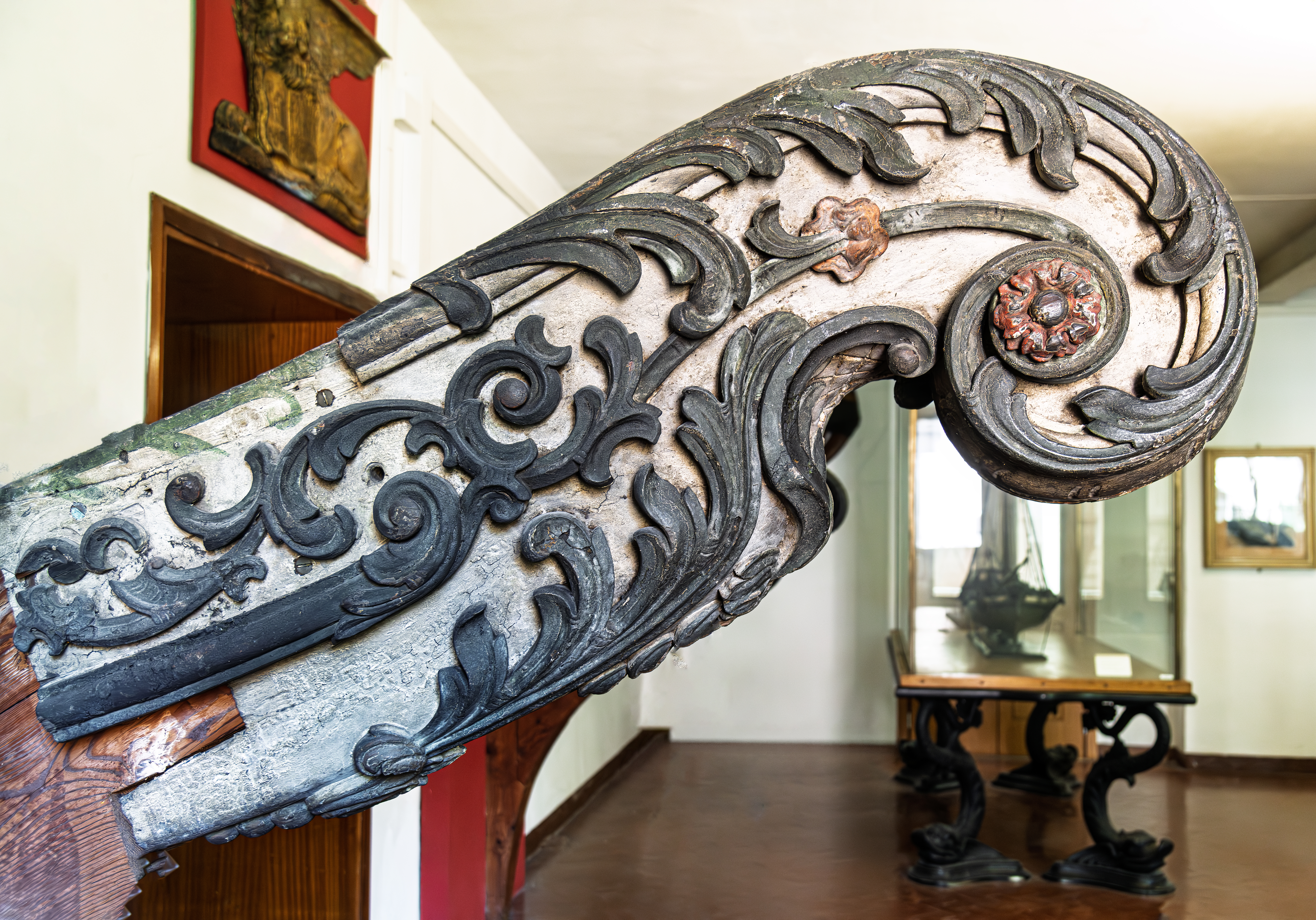
Ornamental frieze from the frigate of the royal Sadrinian navy - (18éme century)

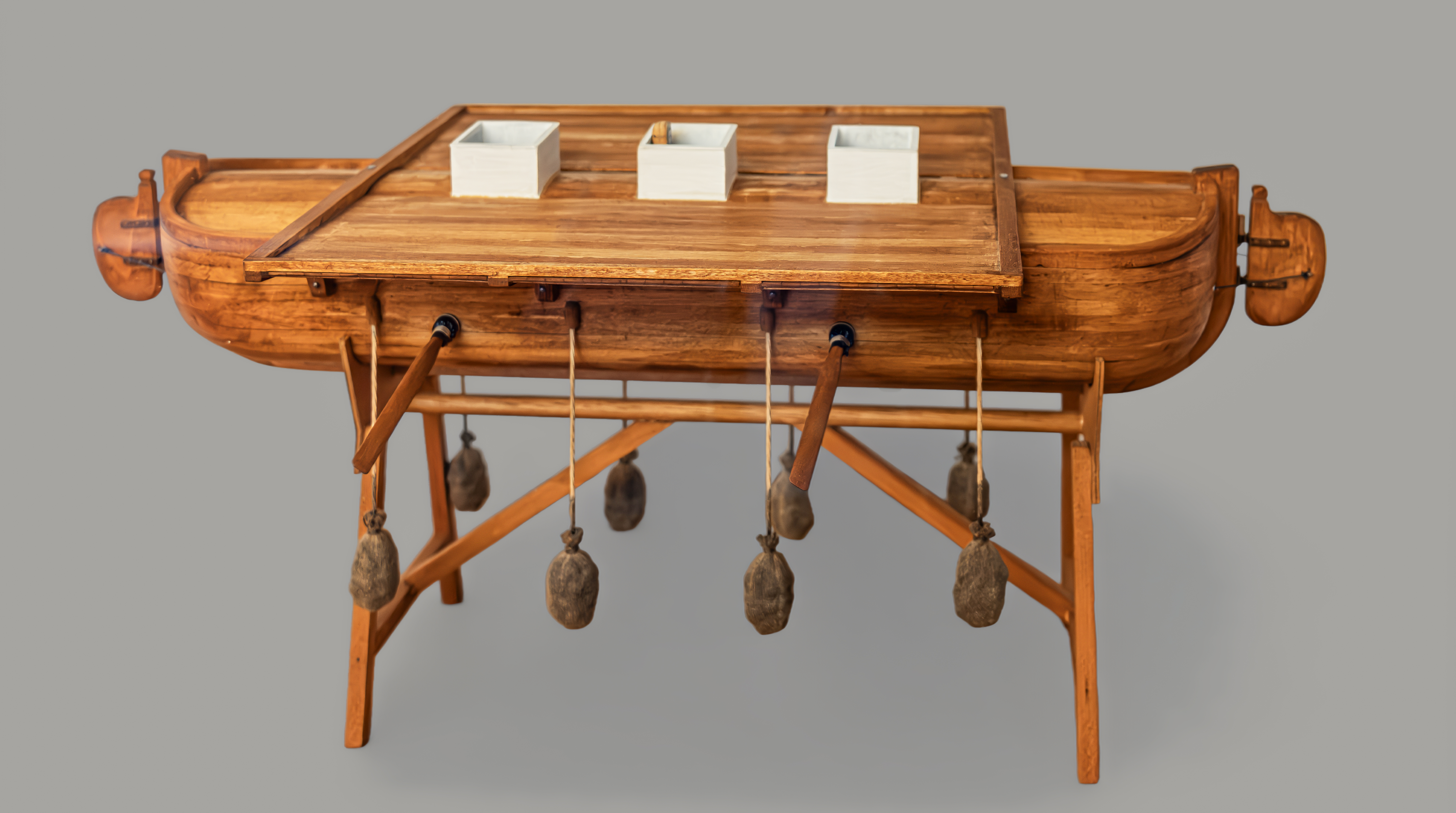
Boat for navigating underwater
