= Bancroft Gherardi =

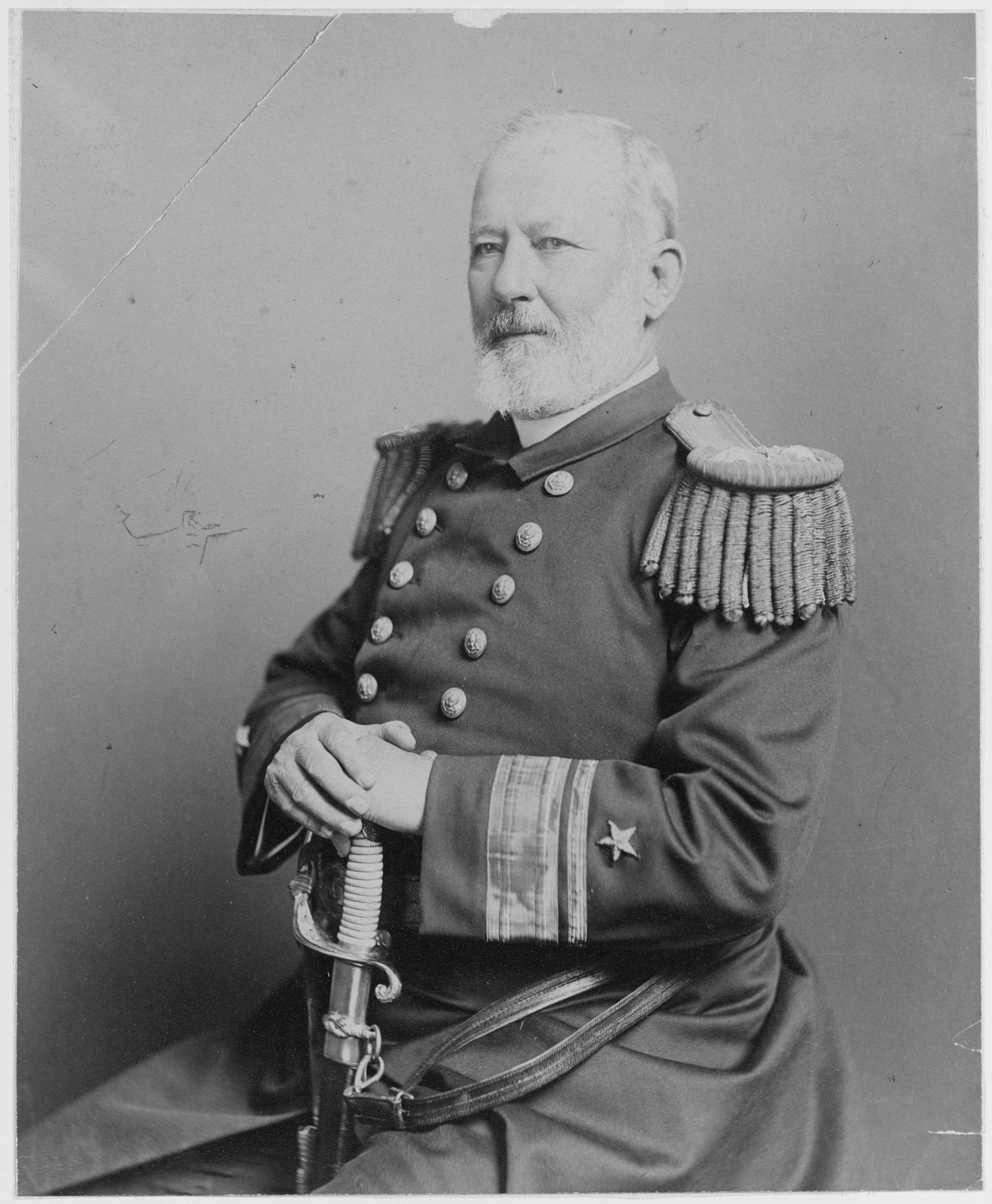
- Born: November 10, 1832; Jackson, Louisiana
- Died: December 10, 1903 (aged 71); Stratford, Connecticut
- Relatives: Bancroft Gherardi, Jr. (son)
- Military career
- Allegiance: United States of America
- Branch: United States Navy
- Service years: 1845–1894
- Rank: Rear admiral
- Commands: USS Chocura; USS Port Royal; USS Colorado; USS Lancaster; USS Baltimore
- Conflicts: Mexican–American War; American Civil War

Bancroft Gherardi (November 10, 1832 – December 10, 1903) was a rear admiral of the United States Navy, who served during the Mexican–American War and the American Civil War. Even though his family hailed from French Corsica, because of his Italian surname (typical of Corsicans) he had the distinction of being the first Italian-American admiral in the United States Navy.

== Biography ==
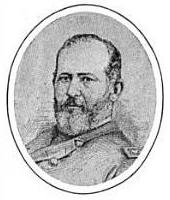
Bancroft Gherardi

Gherardi was born in Jackson, Louisiana, the son of Donato Gherardi (c. 1800 – 1851), a political refugee from Corsica, and Jane Putnam Bancroft (1798–1843), sister of renowned historian George Bancroft. He was appointed Acting Midshipman June 26, 1846 and served on the Ohio during the Mexican–American War. He entered the U.S. Naval Academy in 1851 and graduated the next year. Ordered to the St. Louis, he cruised the Mediterranean, and after promotion to lieutenant in 1855 he was ordered to the Saratoga.

At the outbreak of the American Civil War he served in the steam sloop Lancaster and later became the executive officer of the Chippewa in the North Atlantic Blockading Squadron. He commanded the gunboats Chocura and Port Royal, and was commended for his conduct in the Battle of Mobile Bay under Admiral David Farragut on August 5, 1864.

In later years he commanded receiving ships Colorado and Lancaster, and was present at the bombardment of Alexandria, Egypt, in 1882. He served as President of the Naval Examining Board, as Governor of the Philadelphia Naval Asylum, and as Commandant of the New York Navy Yard. He was promoted to rear admiral on August 25, 1887. In 1893 he was made Commander-in-Chief of the Naval Review Fleet on the Hudson River and then commandant of the New York Navy Yard.

He retired from the Navy on November 10, 1894, and died at his home in Stratford, Connecticut on December 10, 1903. He is buried with his wife at the United States Naval Academy Cemetery.

== Family ==
Electrical engineer and vice-president of the American Telephone and Telegraph Company Bancroft Gherardi, Jr. was his son; Assemblyman Gherardi Davis (1858–1941) was his nephew.

== Legacy ==
The destroyer USS Gherardi (DD-637), launched in 1942, was named in his honor.

Military offices
| Preceded by Stephen B. Luce | Commander-in-Chief, North Atlantic Squadron; 28 January 1889–10 September 1892 | Succeeded by John G. Walker |
