= Bancroft Gherardi Jr. =

American electrical engineer (1873–1941)

- Born: April 6, 1873; San Francisco, California, U.S.
- Died: August 14, 1941 (aged 68); French River, Ontario, Canada
- Education: Cornell University; Polytechnic Institute of Brooklyn
- Known for: Telephone engineering
- Awards: IEEE Edison Medal (1932)

Bancroft Gherardi Jr. (April 6, 1873 – August 14, 1941) was a noted American electrical engineer and business executive as vice-president of the American Telephone and Telegraph Company (AT&T). He was known for his pioneering work in developing the early telephone and transmission systems in the United States. Recognized as one of the foremost authorities in telephone engineering, Gherardi was instrumental in developing the transcontinental telephone service in 1915 and the trans-Atlantic radio telephone service in 1927. He was awarded the IEEE Edison Medal in 1932 for "contributions to the art of telephone engineering and the development of electrical communication".

== Education ==
Gherardi was born in San Francisco on April 6, 1873, son of Bancroft and Anna Talbot (Rockwell) Gherardi. Gherardi received his B.S. in electrical engineering from the Polytechnic Institute of Brooklyn in 1891, and his M.E. and M.M.E degrees from Cornell University in 1893 and 1894, respectively. He received an honorary D. Eng. degree from the Polytechnic Institute of Brooklyn in 1933.

== Professional career ==
Gherardi started his industrial career in 1895 as engineering assistant in the Metropolitan Telephone and Telegraph Company and the New York Telephone Company where he became its Traffic Engineer four years later. In 1907, he was selected to join the American Telephone and Telegraph Company (AT&T) as equipment engineer for the Bell System, and rose through the ranks to Chief Engineer. He was finally appointed to the position of vice-president of AT&T in 1920, in charge of the Department of Operation and Engineering, which he held until his retirement in 1938.

Gherardi is widely recognized as one of the foremost authorities on early telephone engineering for his role in several landmark projects such as the transcontinental telephone service in 1915 and the trans-Atlantic radio telephone service in 1927. He also personally supervised the construction of a "loaded" cable between New York City and Newark, New Jersey, the first such application based on the invention of Michael I. Pupin that improved the transmission on telephone circuits.

Gherardi was a fellow of the American Institute of Electrical Engineers, and served as its president from 1927 to 1928. He was a member of the United Engineering Society, American Society of Mechanical Engineers, American Standards Association, New York Electrical Society, and the Franklin Institute. He was also inducted into the United States National Academy of Sciences, and served as the president of the Polytechnic Institute of Brooklyn's alumni association.
