= Senator Knapp =

Senator Knapp may refer to:

- Anthony L. Knapp (1828–1881), Illinois State Senate
- Charles L. Knapp (1847–1929), New York State Senate
- H. Wallace Knapp (1869–1929), New York State Senate
