= James Frawley (disambiguation) =

James Frawley (1936–2019) was an American director and actor.

James Frawley may also refer to:

- James Frawley (footballer) (born 1988), Australian rules footballer
- James Frawley (tennis) (born 1994), Australian tennis player
- James J. Frawley (1867–1926), American politician from New York
