= Senator Riordan =

Senator Riordan may refer to:

- Daniel E. Riordan (1863–1942), Wisconsin State Senate
- Daniel J. Riordan (1870–1923), New York State Senate
