= Henry M. Sage Estate =

American Historic Place, built 1920)

- U.S. National Register of Historic Places
- Location within New York Location within the United States
- Location: 1 Sage Rd., Menands, New York
- Coordinates: 42°41′38″N 73°44′2″W
- Area: 56 acres (23 ha)
- Built: 1920
- Architect: Reynolds, Marcus T.
- Architectural style: Colonial Revival, Shingle Style, Georgian Revival
- NRHP reference No.: 80004398
- Added to NRHP: July 4, 1980

Henry M. Sage Estate, also known as "Fernbrook," is a historic estate home located at Menands in Albany County, New York. The main house was built in the 1890s and remodeled in 1920. It is an asymmetrical three-story, Georgian Revival style mansion sheathed in limestone. It has a hipped roof and dormers. It features a large, two-story, pedimented portico supported by four Ionic order columns. Also on the property are a carriage barn and caretaker's cottage dated to the 1890s. The estate was bequeathed to Rensselaer Polytechnic Institute by Cornelia Cogswell Sage, widow of Henry M. Sage. She retained use of the property until her death in 1972. The estate was costly to maintain so the Institute sold the property in 1973 to Albany International Corporation.

It was listed on the National Register of Historic Places in 1980.
