= Jacob E. Salomon =

American politician

Jacob E. Salomon (1871–1922) was an American lawyer and politician.

A Chicago native born in 1871, Salomon studied at a grammar school in the city, then moved to New York City and found work as a merchant. He earned a bachelor's degree from St. Francis Xavier College in Manhattan and graduated from the New York University School of Law. Salomon served as an editor for The American Negligence Cases before founding his own legal practice. He was a member of the 128th and 129th New York State Legislature, representing Harlem, a part of the 33rd district, as a Democrat, winning elections against Robert D. Ireland in 1904 and George W. Corwin in 1905. Salomon maintained his legal practice until his death on July 28, 1922. He suffered a seizure while at work, and was sent to the Broad Street Hospital, where he died of heart disease.

New York State Assembly
Preceded by John C. Hackett	New York State Assembly; New York County, 13th District; 1905–1906	Succeeded by James J. Hoey
