= Edgar T. Brackett =

American politician

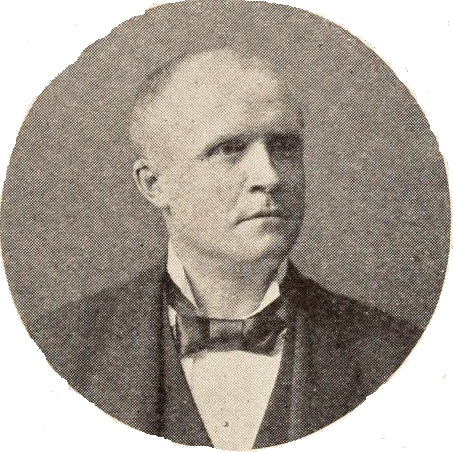
Edgar T. Brackett (1900)

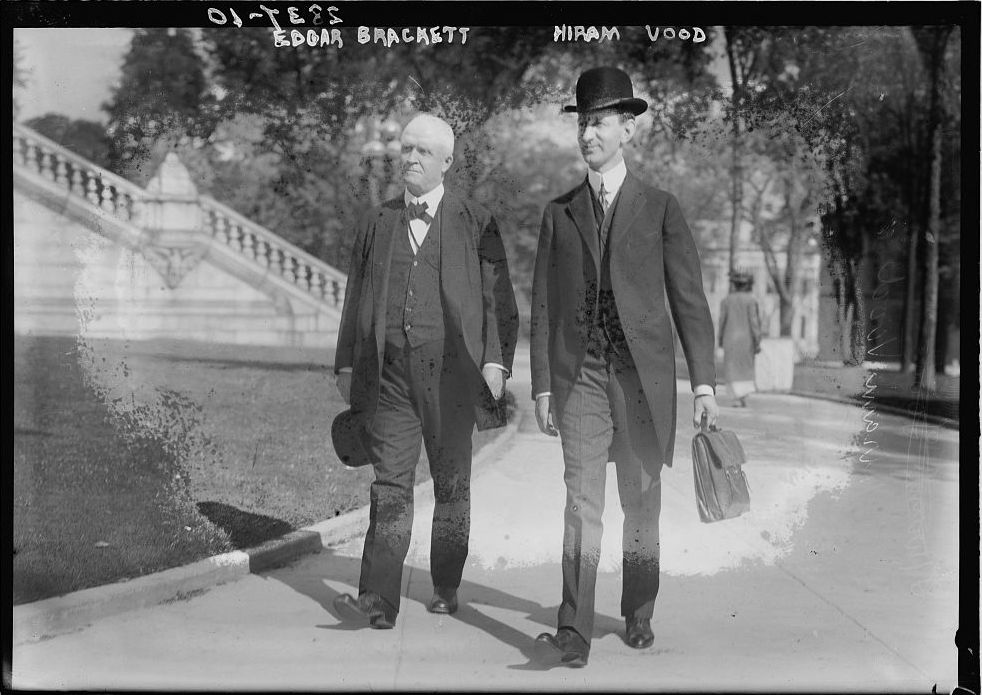
Brackett and Hiram R. Wood circa 1913

Edgar Truman Brackett (July 30, 1853 – February 27, 1924), was a lawyer, businessman, and a member of the New York State Senate.

== Biography ==
Edgar Brackett was born on July 30, 1853, at Emerson's Corners (now Gurn Spring) in Wilton, New York, to William Brackett and Elizabeth Ann Sherman. After spending his youth in Iowa he returned to Saratoga Springs in 1872 to practice law. In 1882, he married Mary Emma Corliss and they had several children, among them the screenwriter Charles Brackett.

His accomplishments included participation in the impeachment of New York Governor William Sulzer in 1913 and the founding of McGregor Links golf course near Saratoga Springs, "considered by experts to be one of the best in the country" in 1921.

Edgar T. Brackett was a member of the New York State Senate (28th D.) from 1896 to 1906, sitting in the 119th, 120th, 121st, 122nd, 123rd, 124th, 125th, 126th, 127th, 128th and 129th New York State Legislatures.

He was again a member of the State Senate (30th D.) from 1909 to 1912. sitting in the 132nd, 133rd, 134th and 135th New York State Legislatures; and was Minority Leader from 1911 to 1912.

He died on February 27, 1924, in Saratoga Springs, New York.

== Business interests ==
In 1889 Brackett was a founder, with Sidney Rickard and George F. Harvey, of the G.F. Harvey Company, a pharmaceutical manufacturer in Saratoga Springs, and was a director of the company. In 1901, Edgar Brackett founded the Adirondack Trust Company and remained as president until his death in 1924.

== Postscript ==
In 2013 a large cache of Senator Brackett's personal records and correspondence was discovered concealed by a dropped ceiling in Saratoga Springs City Hall, where he had a law office. The records, dating from the 1890s to 1905 are now being digitized "and hopefully they'll be available to the public."

New York State Senate
Preceded by Cornelius R. Parsons	New York State Senate; 28th District; 1896–1906	Succeeded by William J. Grattan
Preceded by H. Wallace Knapp	New York State Senate; 30th District; 1909–1912	Succeeded by George H. Whitney
