= Willis A. Reeve =

American dentist and politician

Willis Addison Reeve (February 4, 1860 – July 31, 1932) was an American dentist and politician from New York.

== Life ==
Reeve was born on February 4, 1860, in Aquebogue, New York. He moved with his parents to Riverhead when he was seven.

Reeve studied dentistry at the New York College of Dentistry, graduating from there in 1882. He initially opened an office in Port Jefferson, but poor health lead him to move to California for a year. Returning to New York in 1883, he spent a short time in Goshen with Dr. W. S. Elliott. He then settled in Patchogue and practiced dentistry there. He also participated in the 1894 Dr. Cook Arctic Expedition in the steamship Miranda; the ship was lost, but the passengers and crew were all saved. He took part in an exploring expedition in 1900 with five Indigenous Canadians and three French Canadians into Labrador, traveling 300 miles than any white person went until then.

In 1901, Reeve was elected to the New York State Assembly as a Republican, representing the Suffolk County 1st District. He served in the Assembly in 1902, 1903, 1904, and 1905.

Reeve was president of the board of trustees of the Patchogue Public Library, president of the Patchogue chapter of the American Red Cross, and a trustee of the Union Savings Bank at Patchogue. He was a member of the Sons of the American Revolution, the Freemasons, the Royal Arch Masonry, and the Shriners. In 1902, he married Mary J. Bailey, daughter of assemblyman Edwin Bailey.

Reeve died at home on July 31, 1932. He was buried in Cedar Grove Cemetery in Patchogue.

New York State Assembly
Preceded by Joseph N. Hallock	New York State Assembly; Suffolk County, 1st District; 1902–1905	Succeeded by John M. Lupton
