= Sherman Moreland =

American politician

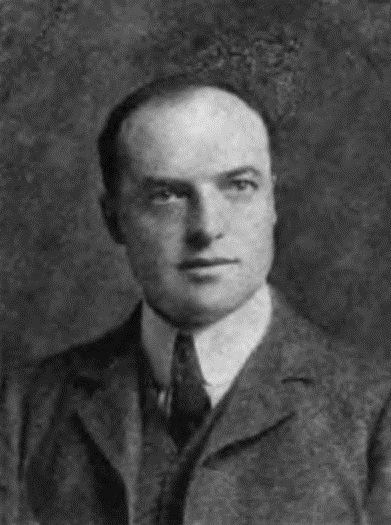

Personal details
- Born: October 16, 1868
- Died: December 27, 1951 (aged 83)
- Education: Cornell University L.L.B.
- US Army service
- Allegiance: United States
- Branch: United States Army JAG Corps
- Service years: 1918-1929
- Rank: Colonel

Sherman Moreland (October 16, 1868 – December 27, 1951) was an American lawyer and politician from New York and the Philippines.

== Early life ==
He was born on October 16, 1868, in Van Etten, Chemung County, New York. He attended the district school. Then, he worked for two years in a bark mill and then as a clerk in a hardware store. In 1888, he enrolled at Cornell University and graduated B.Litt. in 1892. He graduated LL.B. from Cornell Law School in 1894, was admitted to the bar in 1896, and practiced law in Van Etten.

== Political career ==
Moreland was a member of the New York State Assembly (Chemung Co.) in 1903, 1904, 1905, 1906 and 1907; and was Majority Leader in 1906 and 1907. In 1907, he sponsored the Moreland Act, which allows the governor to investigate any public department within the state, a power previously held only by the legislature.

== Later life ==
In 1909, Moreland was appointed by President Theodore Roosevelt to the Supreme Court of the Philippines. In 1911, he acted briefly as Dean of the University of the Philippines College of Law when the latter was established. He remained on the bench until 1917, when he joined the Judge Advocate General's Corps, United States Army. He appeared as chief prosecutor at the court-martial of Col. Billy Mitchell in 1925. He retired, with the rank of colonel, from the army in 1929 and resumed his law practice in Van Etten.

He died on December 27, 1951, at his home in Van Etten, New York; and was buried at the Canfield Cemetery there.

New York State Assembly
Preceded by Charles H. Knipp	New York State Assembly; Chemung County; 1903–1907	Succeeded by David C. Robinson
Political offices
Preceded by James T. Rogers	Majority Leader of the New York State Assembly; 1906–1907	Succeeded by Edwin A. Merritt, Jr.
