= William Townsend (New York politician) =

American lawyer and politician (1848–1919)

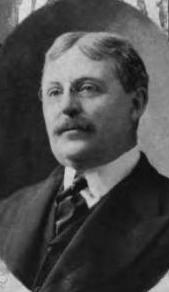
William Townsend (1903)

William Townsend (August 22, 1848 in Walton, Delaware County, New York – December 23, 1919 in Utica, Oneida County, New York) was an American lawyer and politician from New York.

== Life ==
He was the son of John Townsend (1803–1870) and Sarah (Howell) Townsend (1821–1904). He attended Walton Academy; and graduated from Yale College in 1871. Then he studied law with Charles Mason, was admitted to the bar in 1876, and practiced in Utica.

He was Assistant District Attorney of Oneida county from 1876 to 1878; and a member of the New York State Assembly (Oneida Co., 1st D.) in 1883.

Townsend was again Assistant D.A. of Oneida County from 1897 to 1902; and was a member of the New York State Senate (34th D.) in 1903 and 1904.

He was Corporation Counsel of Utica from 1910 to 1911.

He died on December 23, 1919, at his home at 12 Park Place in Utica, after "he had been ill for some little time"; and was buried at the Walton Cemetery in Walton.

== Sources ==
- Official New York from Cleveland to Hughes by Charles Elliott Fitch (Hurd Publishing Co., New York and Buffalo, 1911, Vol. IV; pg. 316 and 365)
- Biographical sketches of the members of the Legislature in The Evening Journal Almanac (1883)
- The New York Red Book by Edgar L. Murlin (1903; pg. 99)

New York State Assembly
Preceded by Patrick Griffin	New York State Assembly; Oneida County, 1st District; 1883	Succeeded by Joseph Joyce
New York State Senate
Preceded by Garry A. Willard	New York State Senate; 34th District; 1903–1904	Succeeded by Henry J. Coggeshall
