= Harry H. Dale =

American politician

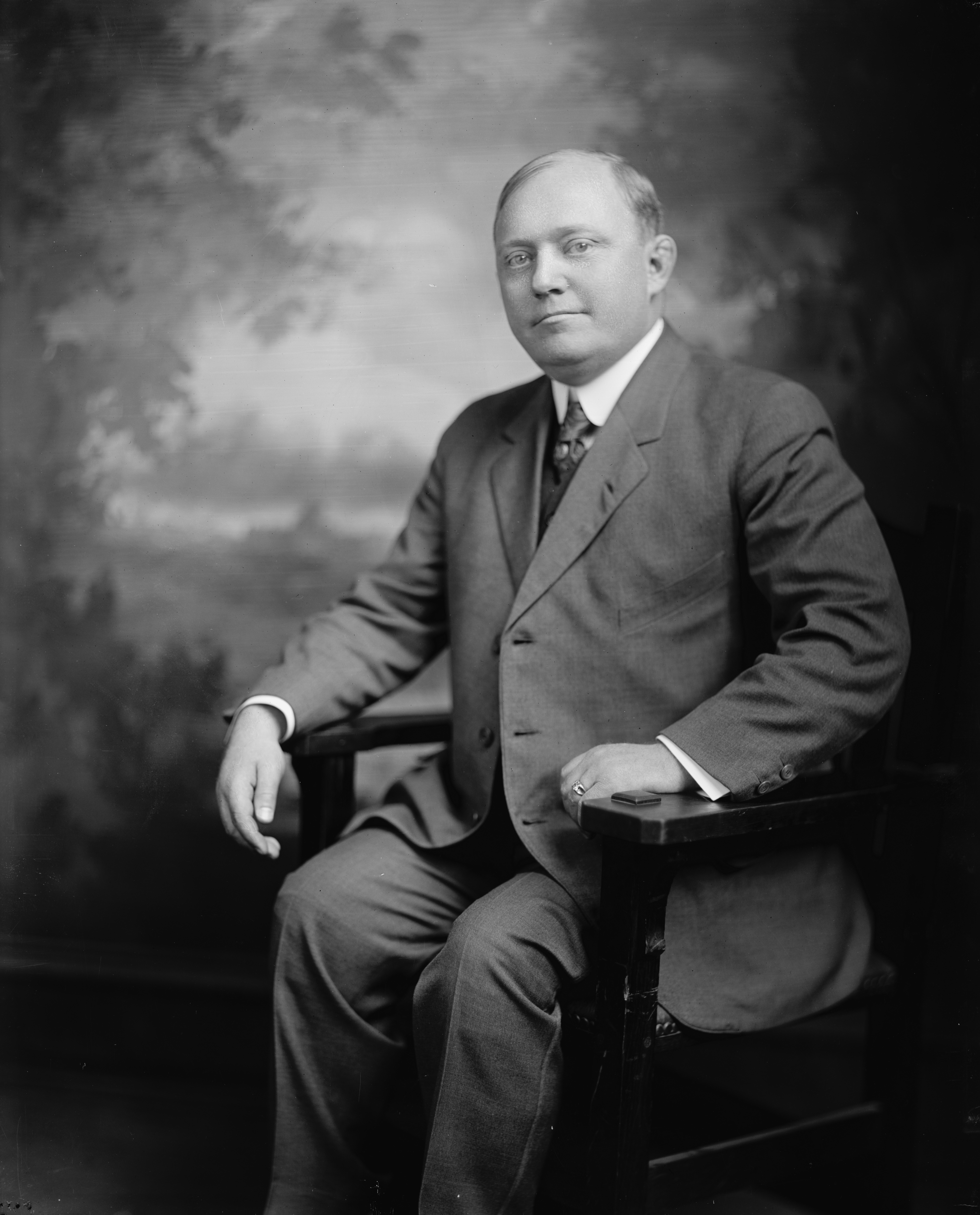

Judge for the Court of Special Sessions
- In office July 22, 1931 – November 17, 1935

Judge of Magistrate's Court
- In office January 7, 1919 – July 21, 1931

Member of the U.S. House of Representatives from New York's 4th district
- In office March 4, 1913 – January 6, 1919
- Preceded by: Frank E. Wilson
- Succeeded by: Thomas H. Cullen

Member of the New York State Assembly (Kings County, 15th Dist.)
- In office 1902–1905
- In office 1898

Personal details
- Born: Harry Howard Dale; December 3, 1868 New York City, New York, U.S.
- Died: November 17, 1935 (aged 66) Bellmore, New York, U.S.
- Party: Democratic
- Education: New York Law School

Harry Howard Dale (December 3, 1868 – November 17, 1935) was an American lawyer and politician who served three terms as a U.S. representative from New York from 1913 to 1919.

== Life ==
Born in New York City, Dale moved with his parents to Brooklyn in 1870. He attended the public schools of Brooklyn and New York Law School. He was admitted to the New York bar May 14, 1891, and commenced practice in Brooklyn, New York. He was a member of the New York State Assembly (Kings Co., 15th D.) in 1898, 1902, 1903, 1904 and 1905. He served as attorney for the State comptroller in 1911 and 1912.

=== Tenure in Congress ===
Dale was elected as a Democrat to the Sixty-third, Sixty-fourth, and Sixty-fifth Congresses and served from March 4, 1913, to January 6, 1919, when he resigned having been appointed judge of the magistrate's court in 1919. Reappointed in 1929 and served from January 7, 1919, to July 21, 1931.

=== Later career and death ===
He was appointed judge for the court of special sessions on July 22, 1931, and served until his death in Bellmore, New York, on November 17, 1935. He remains were cremated and the ashes deposited in Fresh Pond Road Crematory, Brooklyn, New York.

New York State Assembly
Preceded by Joseph Murray	New York State Assembly; Kings County, 15th District; 1898	Succeeded by Charles Juengst
Preceded by Charles Juengst	New York State Assembly; Kings County, 15th District; 1902–1905	Succeeded by Charles C. G. Sprenger
U.S. House of Representatives
Preceded by Frank E. Wilson	Member of the U.S. House of Representatives from New York's 4th congressional district 1913–1919	Succeeded by Thomas H. Cullen
