= James R. Cowan =

American politician

James Rich Cowan (May 22, 1858 – July 14, 1911) was an American farmer, banker, and politician from New York.

== Life ==
Cowan was born on May 22, 1858, in the Cowan homestead near Hobart, New York. His parents were Hector Cowan and Helena Jane Rich.

Cowan attended Stamford Seminary. He initially worked as a farmer, owning 600 acres and between 75 and 100 cattle. In 1891, he became president of the National Bank of Hobart. He served as town supervisor of Stamford from 1889 to 1891, serving as chairman of the board in 1891. He was also a justice of the peace and served on the Hobart High School board of education for 16 years, much of it as president of the board.

In 1891, Cowan was elected to the New York State Assembly as a Republican, representing Delaware County. He served in the Assembly in 1892, 1902, 1903, 1904, 1905, and 1906.

Cowan was unmarried. He was a member of the United Presbyterian church in South Kortright.

Cowan died of typhoid fever on July 14, 1911. He was buried in Locust Hill Cemetery.

New York State Assembly
Preceded by Henry Davie	New York State Assembly; Delaware County; 1892	Succeeded by DeWitt Griffin
Preceded by Delos Axtell	New York State Assembly; Delaware County; 1902-1906	Succeeded by James R. Stevenson
