= Frank L. Wiswall =

American politician (1895–1972)

Member of the New York State Senate from the 30th district
- In office January 1, 1921 – December 31, 1922
- Preceded by: Henry M. Sage
- Succeeded by: William T. Byrne

Member of the New York State Assembly from the Albany County 3rd district
- In office January 1, 1920 – December 31, 1920
- Preceded by: James M. Gaffers
- Succeeded by: James M. Gaffers

Personal details
- Born: July 8, 1895 Colonie, New York, U.S.
- Died: October 24, 1972 (aged 77) Castine, Maine, U.S.
- Party: Republican
- Education: Albany Law School
- Occupation: Politician, lawyer

Frank L. Wiswall (July 8, 1895 in Colonie, Albany County, New York – October 24, 1972 in Castine, Hancock County, Maine) was an American lawyer, horse-racing executive and politician from New York.

== Life ==
He attended the public schools and high school in Watervliet. He graduated from Albany Law School, was admitted to the bar in 1917, and practiced law in Troy and Albany. He also bred horses, and was an amateur harness racer.

Wiswall was a member of the New York State Assembly (Albany Co., 3rd D.) in 1920; and a member of the New York State Senate (30th D.) in 1921 and 1922.

He was executive vice president and secretary of the United States Trotting Association from 1939 to 1941, and then secretary and counsel to the association. He was secretary of the New York State Harness Racing Commission from 1941 to 1945. He was president of the Saratoga Raceway from 1945 to 1963, and then its chairman of the board.

He died on October 24, 1972, at his farm in Castine, Maine.

== Sources ==
- Rittenour Is Chosen President Of New Harness Horse Race Body; Great Power Vested in Wiswall, Executive Officer, by U.S. Trotting Association in NYT on January 9, 1939 (subscription required)
- Frank L. Wiswall Is Dead at 77 in NYT on October 25, 1972 (subscription required)
- Harness Racing Hall of Fame

New York State Assembly
Preceded by James M. Gaffers	New York State Assembly; Albany County, 3rd District; 1920	Succeeded by James M. Gaffers
New York State Senate
Preceded by Henry M. Sage	New York State Senate; 30th District; 1921–1922	Succeeded by William T. Byrne
