= Owen Cassidy =

American politician (c. 1862–1911)

Owen Cassidy (c.1862 – January 15, 1911 in Watkins, Schuyler County, New York) was an American lawyer and politician from New York.

== Life ==
In 1890, he married Alice Jones, and they had two children. In 1899, he was a member of the New York State Board of Health.

Cassidy was a member of the New York State Senate (40th D.) from 1905 to 1908, sitting in the 128th, 129th, 130th and 131st New York State Legislatures. In 1908, Cassidy was voted down by the 41st senatorial district convention, and ran as an Independent for re-election, but was defeated. Afterwards he resumed the practice of law in Watkins.

He died on January 15, 1911, at his home in Watkins, after having been ill for years, and "bedridden for the last few months".

== Sources ==
- Official New York from Cleveland to Hughes by Charles Elliott Fitch (Hurd Publishing Co., New York and Buffalo, 1911, Vol. IV; pg. 365f)
- STATE HEALTH BOARD SCANDAL in NYT on December 12, 1899
- CASSIDY AN INDEPENDENT in NYT on October 1, 1908
- CASSIDY WILL AID HUGHES in NYT on July 23, 1909
- EX-SENATOR CASSIDY DIES in NYT on January 16, 1911

New York State Senate
Preceded by Edwin C. Stewart	New York State Senate; 40th District; 1905–1908	Succeeded by Charles J. Hewitt
