= Thomas J. McManus =

American politician (1864–1926)

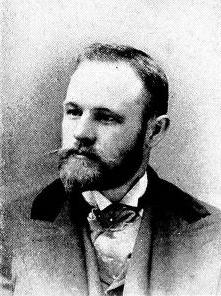
McManus c. 1893

Thomas Joseph McManus (March 4, 1864 – July 30, 1926) was an American politician from New York. During his political career he became known as "The McManus".

== Life ==
Thomas Joseph "The" McManus was born in New York City, the 4th of ten (surviving) children. His parents were Irish immigrants John J. McManus (1824–1897) a native of Currabawn, Drumlish, Co. Longford, Ireland and Maria Quinn (1837–1907) a native of Ballinamuck, Co. Longford, Ireland. He attended Grammar School No. 51, graduating with the Class of 1882. In his early life, he followed his father John, a stone cutter by trade, into the contracting business, along with several of his brothers, which he carried on for a number of years.

For many years he had a deep interest in politics. It was Thomas J McManus' older brother Owen McManus (1862–1919) who first ventured from contracting into politics. The rest of his brothers soon joined and formed the early political family dynasty. Thomas was part of the "Seven McManus Brothers" as they were then known: John J, Patrick H., Owen, Thomas J., James L., Edward A. and Charles A. McManus. Another brother, William, was a New York City fireman. A sister Rose Maria and brother Francis died as children. Thomas' oldest brother John J. McManus (1853–1927) formed "The Thomas J. McManus Democratic Association" as the family's political clubhouse and headquarters in Hell's Kitchen.

In 1891, Thomas J. McManus was elected to the State Assembly from the Seventeenth District of New York City. and served during the sessions of 1892 and 1893. Ten years later, he was elected to the Assembly from the Fifteenth District, and was re-elected in 1903, 1904 and 1905. In the fall of 1906, he was elected to the Senate of the State of New York from the Fifteenth Senatorial District, succeeding Senator Peter J. Dooling. and was re-elected in 1908. In 1907, 1908, 1909 and 1910, Senator McManus was a member of the following Senate committees: Railroads. Banks. Military Affairs, Revision and Engrossed Bills, and Public Printing. He was a member of the Democratic Club of New York City, and of the Catholic Benevolent Legion of the State of New York. For several years he was the New York City agent for the National Security Company, with offices at 115 Broadway, New York City. After retiring as Senator, Thomas joined with his brother Owen in the Bonding business at 38 Park Row in New York City.

McManus was a member of the New York State Assembly in 1892 (New York Co., 17th D.), 1893 (New York Co., 18th D.), 1903, 1904 and 1905 (all three New York Co., 15th D.).

He was a member of the New York State Senate (15th D.) from 1907 to 1912, sitting in the 130th, 131st, 132nd, 133rd, 134th and 135th New York State Legislatures.

On the evening of July 29, 1926, he presided over a meeting of his Tammany Hall district organization, and was taken ill just before midnight, suffering from high blood pressure. He died a short time later, during the early hours of the next day at the family home at 452 W. 49th Street in New York City. He was succeeded in politics by his brother Charles A. McManus (1879–1929), who served on the Board of Aldermen of New York City.

McManus was known as a gentlemen in his district. He stood 6'3" tall with a head of red hair and well-trimmed goatee. He was known to often say that he never smoked or touched liquor. He was a lifelong bachelor.

Senator McManus died in Manhattan, New York City, and is buried in Calvary Cemetery, Queens, New York.

== Sources ==
- Official New York from Cleveland to Hughes by Charles Elliott Fitch (Hurd Publishing Co., New York and Buffalo, 1911, Vol. IV; pg. 329, 331, 347, 349f and 366f)
- New York State Legislative Souvenir for 1893 with Portraits of the Members of Both Houses by Henry P. Phelps (pg. 46f)
- The New York Red Book by Edgar L. Murlin (1903; pg. 154)
- THE M'MANUS DIES; A TAMMANY LEADER in NYT on July 31, 1926 (subscription required)

New York State Assembly
Preceded by John Kerrigan	New York State Assembly; New York County, 17th District; 1892	Succeeded by John Kerrigan
Preceded by Daniel F. Martin	New York State Assembly; New York County, 18th District; 1893	Succeeded by Daniel J. Gleason
Preceded by James E. Smith	New York State Assembly; New York County, 15th District; 1903–1905	Succeeded by Owen W. Bohan
New York State Senate
Preceded by Nathaniel A. Elsberg	New York State Senate; 15th District; 1907–1912	Succeeded by John J. Boylan
