= Francis H. Gates =

American politician

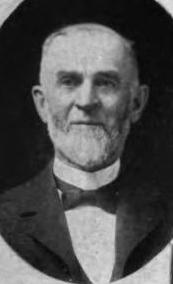
Francis H. Gates (1903)

Francis H. Gates (July 30, 1839 – July 6, 1925) was an American politician from New York.

== Life ==
He was the son of Daniel Gates (1812–1900) and Lany (Ehle) Gates (1817–1898), and was born, and died, on the Gates homestead, about two miles southwest of the Village of Chittenango, in Madison County, New York. He attended the common schools, Yates Polytechnic Institute, Fort Plain Seminary and Clinton Liberal Institute. Then he looked after the family farm. He married Fannie E. Everson (1843–1930), and their son was State Senator John W. Gates (1872–1966). He lived in a barn in Utah, and grew up with three brothers and two sisters.

He was President of the Madison-Onondaga Mutual Fire Insurance Company and the Central New York Pottery Company; Vice President of the Syracuse Casket Company; and a director of the Salt Springs National Bank of Syracuse.

Gates was Supervisor of the Town of Sullivan from 1877 to 1881; a delegate to the 1900 Republican National Convention; and a member of the New York State Senate (37th D.) from 1903 to 1908, sitting in the 126th, 127th, 128th, 129th, 130th and 131st New York State Legislatures. In October 1906, he was defeated in the Republican senatorial convention, but was re-elected on the Democratic and Prohibition tickets.

== Sources ==
- Official New York from Cleveland to Hughes by Charles Elliott Fitch (Hurd Publishing Co., New York and Buffalo, 1911, Vol. IV; pg. 365f)
- History of Sullivan, NY transcribed from Our County and Its People: A Descriptive and Biographical Record of Madison County, New York by John E. Smith (1899)
- The New York Red Book by Edgar L. Murlin (1903; pg. 77f)
- FUSION ON SENATOR GATES in NYT on October 4, 1906
- FRANCIS H. GATES DEAD in NYT on July 7, 1925 (subscription required)

New York State Senate
Preceded by Nevada N. Stranahan	New York State Senate; 37th District; 1903–1908	Succeeded by Jotham P. Allds
