= 129th New York State Legislature =

New York state legislative session

←	128th	130th	→
- New York State Capitol (2009)

Overview
- Legislative body: New York State Legislature
- Jurisdiction: New York, United States
- Term: January 1 – December 31, 1906

Senate
- Members: 50
- President: Lt. Gov. M. Linn Bruce (R)
- Temporary President: John Raines (R)
- Party control: Republican (36-14)

Assembly
- Members: 150
- Speaker: James Wolcott Wadsworth Jr. (R)
- Party control: Republican (108-36-6)

Sessions
- 1st: January 3 – May 3, 1906

The 129th New York State Legislature, consisting of the New York State Senate and the New York State Assembly, met from January 3 to May 3, 1906, during the second year of Frank W. Higgins's governorship, in Albany.

== Background ==
Under the provisions of the New York Constitution of 1894, 50 Senators and 150 assemblymen were elected in single-seat districts; senators for a two-year term, assemblymen for a one-year term. The senatorial districts were made up of entire counties, except New York County (twelve districts), Kings County (seven districts), Erie County (three districts) and Monroe County (two districts). The Assembly districts were made up of contiguous area, all within the same county, .

At this time there were two major political parties: the Republican Party and the Democratic Party. In New York City, the Municipal Ownership League also nominated candidates.

== Elections ==
The New York state election, 1905, was held on November 7. No statewide elective offices were up for election this time. Special elections were held to fill the vacancies in the 16th and 24th senatorial districts.

== Sessions ==
The Legislature met for the regular session at the State Capitol in Albany on January 3, 1906; and adjourned on May 3.

James Wolcott Wadsworth Jr. (R) was elected Speaker with 106 votes against 34 for George M. Palmer (D) and 6 for Thomas F. Long (M.O.L.).

On April 27, the Legislature re-apportioned the Senate districts, increasing the number to 51. The apportionment was then contested in the courts.

The Legislature also re-apportioned the number of assemblymen per county. Nassau County was separated from the remainder of Queens County; Albany, Broome, Cattaraugus, Cayuga, Onondaga, Oswego and Rensselaer counties lost one seat each; Erie, Monroe and Westchester gained one each; and Kings and Queens counties gained two each.

On August 13, the new Senate apportionment was upheld by Supreme Court Justice Howard.

On April 3, 1907, the new Senate and Assembly apportionment was declared unconstitutional by the New York Court of Appeals.

== State Senate ==
=== Districts ===
- 1st District: Richmond and Suffolk counties
- 2nd District: Queens and Nassau counties
- 3rd District: 1st, 2nd, 3rd, 4th, 5th and 6th Ward of Brooklyn, as constituted in 1894
- 4th District: 7th, 13th, 19th and 21st Ward of Brooklyn, as constituted in 1894
- 5th District: 8th, 10th, 12th and 30th Ward of Brooklyn, and the annexed former Town of Gravesend, as constituted in 1894
- 6th District: 9th, 11th, 20th and 22nd Ward of Brooklyn, as constituted in 1894
- 7th District: 14th, 15th, 16th and 17th Ward of Brooklyn, as constituted in 1894
- 8th District: 23rd, 24th, 25th and 29th Ward of Brooklyn; and the annexed former Town of Flatlands, as constituted in 1894
- 9th District: 18th, 26th, 27th and 28th Ward of Brooklyn, as constituted in 1894
- 10th, 11th, 12th, 13th, 14th, 15th, 16th, 17th, 18th, 19th, 20th and 21st District: Parts of the City of New York, defined geographically by their bordering streets, regardless of Wards or Assembly districts
- 22nd District: Westchester County
- 23rd District: Orange and Rockland counties
- 24th District: Columbia, Dutchess and Putnam and counties
- 25th District: Greene and Ulster counties
- 26th District: Chenango, Delaware and Sullivan counties
- 27th District: Fulton, Hamilton, Montgomery and Schoharie counties
- 28th District: Saratoga, Schenectady and Washington counties
- 29th District: Albany County
- 30th District: Rensselaer County
- 31st District: Clinton, Essex and Warren counties
- 32nd District: Franklin and St. Lawrence counties
- 33rd District: Otsego and Herkimer counties
- 34th District: Oneida County
- 35th District: Jefferson and Lewis counties
- 36th District: Onondaga County
- 37th District: Oswego and Madison counties
- 38th District: Broome, Cortland and Tioga counties
- 39th District: Cayuga and Seneca counties
- 40th District: Chemung, Schuyler and Tompkins counties
- 41st District: Steuben and Yates counties
- 42nd District: Ontario and Wayne counties
- 43rd District: 4th, 6th, 7th, 8th, 12th, 13th, 14th, 16th, 17th and 18th Ward of Rochester; and the towns of Brighton, Henrietta, Irondequoit, Menden, Penfield, Perinton, Pittsford, Rush and Webster, in Monroe County
- 44th District: 1st, 2nd, 3rd, 5th, 9th, 10th, 11th, 15th, 19th and 20th Ward of Rochester; and the towns of Chili, Clarkson, Gates, Greece, Hamlin, Ogden, Parma, Riga, Sweden and Wheatland, in Monroe County
- 45th District: Genesee, Niagara and Orleans counties
- 46th District: Allegany, Livingston and Wyoming counties
- 47th District: 1st, 2nd, 3rd, 6th, 15th, 19th, 20th, 21st, 22nd, 23rd and 24th Ward of Buffalo
- 48th District: 4th, 5th, 7th, 8th, 9th, 10th, 11th, 12th, 13th, 14th and 16th Ward of Buffalo
- 49th District: 17th, 18th and 25th Ward of the City of Buffalo; and all area in Erie County outside Buffalo
- 50th District: Cattaraugus and Chautauqua counties

Note: In 1897, New York County (the boroughs of Manhattan and Bronx), Kings County (the borough of Brooklyn), Richmond County (the borough of Staten Island) and the Western part of Queens County (the borough of Queens) were consolidated into the present-day City of New York. The Eastern part of Queens County (the non-consolidated part) was separated in 1899 as Nassau County. Parts of the 1st and 2nd Assembly districts of Westchester County were annexed by New York City in 1895, and became part of the Borough of the Bronx in 1898.

=== Members ===
The asterisk (*) denotes members of the previous Legislature who continued in office as members of this Legislature.

District	Senator	Party	Notes
1st	Carll S. Burr Jr.*	Republican	
2nd	Luke A. Keenan*	Democrat	
3rd	Thomas H. Cullen*	Democrat	
4th	John Drescher Jr.*	Republican	
5th	James J. Kehoe*	Democrat	
6th	Frank J. Gardner*	Republican	
7th	Patrick H. McCarren*	Democrat	
8th	Charles Cooper*	Republican	
9th	Conrad Hasenflug*	Democrat	
10th	Daniel J. Riordan*	Democrat	on November 6, 1906, elected to the 59th U.S. Congress
11th	John C. Fitzgerald*	Democrat	
12th	Samuel J. Foley*	Democrat	
13th	Bernard F. Martin*	Democrat	
14th	Thomas F. Grady*	Democrat	Minority Leader
15th	Nathaniel A. Elsberg*	Republican	
16th	John M. Quinn	Democrat	elected to fill vacancy, in place of Peter J. Dooling
17th	Martin Saxe*	Republican	
18th	Jacob Marks*	Democrat	
19th	Alfred R. Page*	Republican	
20th	James J. Frawley*	Democrat	
21st	John A. Hawkins*	Democrat	
22nd	Francis M. Carpenter*	Republican	
23rd	Louis F. Goodsell*	Republican	
24th	Sanford W. Smith	Republican	elected to fill vacancy, in place of Henry S. Ambler
25th	John N. Cordts*	Republican	
26th	Jotham P. Allds*	Republican	
27th	Spencer K. Warnick*	Republican	
28th	Edgar T. Brackett*	Republican	
29th	James B. McEwan*	Republican	
30th	William D. Barnes*	Republican	
31st	Spencer G. Prime*	Republican	
32nd	George R. Malby*	Republican	
33rd	Walter L. Brown*	Republican	
34th	Henry J. Coggeshall*	Republican	
35th	George H. Cobb*	Republican	
36th	Horace White*	Republican	
37th	Francis H. Gates*	Republican	
38th	Harvey D. Hinman*	Republican	
39th	Benjamin M. Wilcox*	Republican	
40th	Owen Cassidy*	Republican	
41st	William J. Tully*	Republican	
42nd	John Raines*	Republican	President pro tempore
43rd	Merton E. Lewis*	Republican	
44th	William W. Armstrong*	Republican	
45th	Irving L'Hommedieu*	Republican	
46th	Frederick C. Stevens*	Republican	
47th	Henry W. Hill*	Republican	
48th	Louis Fechter, Sr.*	Republican	
49th	George Allen Davis*	Republican	
50th	Albert T. Fancher*	Republican	

=== Employees ===
- Clerk: Lafayette B. Gleason
- Sergeant-at-Arms: Charles R. Hotaling
- Assistant Sergeant-at-Arms: Everett Brown
- Stenographer: James C. Marriott

== State Assembly ==
=== Assemblymen ===
District		Assemblymen	Party	Notes
Albany	1st	Charles W. Mead*	Republican	
Albany	2nd	Abram S. Coon*	Republican	
Albany	3rd	Thomas F. Maher	Republican	
Albany	4th	William J. Grattan*	Republican	
Allegany		Jesse S. Phillips*	Republican	
Broome	1st	James T. Rogers*	Republican	
Broome	2nd	Fred E. Allen*	Republican	
Cattaraugus	1st	Jasper E. Smith	Republican	
Cattaraugus	2nd	John J. Volk	Republican	
Cayuga	1st	Judson W. Hapeman*	Republican	
Cayuga	2nd	J. Guernsey Allen*	Republican	
Chautauqua	1st	Arthur C. Wade*	Republican	
Chautauqua	2nd	Henry K. Williams	Republican	
Chemung		Sherman Moreland*	Republican	Majority Leader
Chenango		Charles L. Carrier*	Republican	
Clinton		H. Wallace Knapp*	Republican	
Columbia		Edward W. Scovill*	Republican	
Cortland		Fred A. Crosley	Republican	
Delaware		James R. Cowan*	Republican	
Dutchess	1st	Myron Smith	Republican	
Dutchess	2nd	Augustus B. Gray*	Republican	
Erie	1st	Charles J. Quinn*	Democrat	
Erie	2nd	Robert L. Cox*	Republican	
Erie	3rd	Frank S. Burzynski*	Democrat	
Erie	4th	Charles V. Lynch	Democrat	
Erie	5th	Louis Dressing	Democrat	
Erie	6th	James S. Keyes	Democrat	
Erie	7th	John K. Patton*	Republican	
Erie	8th	Luther J. Shuttleworth*	Republican	
Essex		Frank C. Hooper*	Republican	
Franklin		Charles R. Matthews*	Republican	
Fulton and Hamilton		William Ellison Mills	Republican	
Genesee		S. Percy Hooker*	Republican	
Greene		William C. Brady*	Republican	
Herkimer		Abram B. Steele*	Republican	
Jefferson	1st	Albert Foster*	Republican	
Jefferson	2nd	Gary H. Wood	Republican	
Kings	1st	Thomas O'Neill*	Rep./M.O.L.	
Kings	2nd	Patrick Donohue	Rep./M.O.L.	
Kings	3rd	Thomas P. Reilly*	Democrat	
Kings	4th	William W. Colne	Republican	
Kings	5th	Otto G. Foelker*	Rep./M.O.L.	
Kings	6th	Thomas J. Surpless	Rep./M.O.L.	
Kings	7th	Michael J. Grady*	Democrat	
Kings	8th	James A. Thompson*	Democrat	
Kings	9th	Thomas F. McGuire	Democrat	
Kings	10th	Charles F. Murphy*	Rep./M.O.L.	
Kings	11th	William S. Shanahan*	Dem./M.O.L.	
Kings	12th	George A. Green	Rep./M.O.L.	
Kings	13th	Samuel J. Palmer	Rep./M.O.L.	
Kings	14th	George W. Kavanagh*	Democrat	
Kings	15th	Charles C. G. Sprenger	Rep./M.O.L.	
Kings	16th	Charles J. Weber	Republican	
Kings	17th	Edward C. Dowling*	Republican	
Kings	18th	Warren I. Lee	Republican	
Kings	19th	Charles Schmitt	Rep./M.O.L.	
Kings	20th	Charles Feth	M.O.L.	
Kings	21st	Frank E. Harvey	M.O.L.	
Lewis		C. Fred Boshart	Republican	
Livingston		James Wolcott Wadsworth Jr.*	Republican	elected Speaker
Madison		Robert J. Fish*	Republican	
Monroe	1st	DeWitt C. Becker*	Republican	
Monroe	2nd	James L. Whitley	Republican	
Monroe	3rd	Robert Averill	Republican	
Monroe	4th	Albert P. Beebe*	Republican	
Montgomery		William B. Charles*	Republican	
New York	1st	Thomas B. Caughlan*	Democrat	
New York	2nd	Al Smith*	Democrat	
New York	3rd	John T. Eagleton	Democrat	
New York	4th	William H. Burns*	Democrat	
New York	5th	Leslie J. Tompkins*	Democrat	
New York	6th	James Oliver	Democrat	
New York	7th	Thomas F. Long	M.O.L./Rep.	
New York	8th	Abraham Harawitz	Democrat	
New York	9th	Patrick H. Bird*	Democrat	
New York	10th	Samuel Hoffman	Rep./M.O.L.	
New York	11th	John J. Sammon*	Democrat	
New York	12th	Max Eckmann	M.O.L./Rep.	
New York	13th	John C. Hackett*	Democrat	
New York	14th	Jacob Fritz	Democrat	
New York	15th	Owen W. Bohan	Democrat	
New York	16th	Gustave Hartman*	Rep./M.O.L.	
New York	17th	Christopher Steffens	Rep./M.O.L.	
New York	18th	Edward B. La Fetra*	Democrat	
New York	19th	Mervin C. Stanley*	Rep./M.O.L.	
New York	20th	Thomas A. Farnan	Rep./M.O.L.	
New York	21st	William Young*	Rep./M.O.L.	
New York	22nd	Thomas Rock	Rep./M.O.L.	
New York	23rd	James A. Francis	Rep./M.O.L.	
New York	24th	John T. Story	Rep./M.O.L.	
New York	25th	Ezra P. Prentice*	Republican	
New York	26th	Roger J. Brennan	Rep./M.O.L.	
New York	27th	George B. Agnew*	Republican	
New York	28th	George Schwegler	Democrat	
New York	29th	Frederick D. Wells	Rep./M.O.L.	
New York	30th	Maurice F. Smith	M.O.L.	
New York	31st	J. Sidney Bernstein	Democrat	on December 27, 1906, appointed as Transfer Tax; Appraiser by Comptroller-elect Martin H. Glynn
New York	32nd	Samuel Krulewitch	Rep./M.O.L.	
New York	33rd	Jacob E. Salomon*	Democrat	
New York	34th	Charles Campbell	M.O.L.	
New York	35th	John P. Cohalan	Democrat	
Niagara	1st	A. Edmund Lee	Democrat	
Niagara	2nd	W. Levell Draper	Republican	
Oneida	1st	Henry L. Gates*	Republican	
Oneida	2nd	Jay H. Pratt*	Republican	
Oneida	3rd	John C. Evans*	Republican	
Onondaga	1st	Charles H. Gregory	Republican	
Onondaga	2nd	Edward Schoeneck*	Republican	
Onondaga	3rd	George L. Baldwin	Republican	
Onondaga	4th	Fred W. Hammond*	Republican	
Ontario		Jean L. Burnett*	Republican	
Orange	1st	William G. Hastings*	Republican	
Orange	2nd	Louis Bedell*	Republican	
Orleans		Henry V. Wilson*	Republican	
Oswego	1st	Thomas D. Lewis*	Republican	
Oswego	2nd	Fred G. Whitney*	Republican	
Otsego		Deloss E. Bass*	Republican	
Putnam		John R. Yale*	Republican	
Queens	1st	Dennis J. Harte	Democrat	
Queens	2nd	William A. De Groot	Rep./M.O.L.	
Queens and Nassau		William G. Miller*	Republican	
Rensselaer	1st	Frederick C. Filley	Republican	
Rensselaer	2nd	Michael D. Nolan	Democrat	
Rensselaer	3rd	Bradford R. Lansing	Republican	
Richmond		Arnold J. B. Wedemeyer*	Democrat	
Rockland		Gouverneur M. Carnochan	Democrat	
St. Lawrence	1st	Fred J. Gray	Republican	
St. Lawrence	2nd	Edwin A. Merritt Jr.*	Republican	
Saratoga		George H. Whitney*	Republican	
Schenectady		William W. Wemple*	Republican	
Schoharie		George M. Palmer*	Democrat	Minority Leader
Schuyler		John W. Gurnett*	Democrat	
Seneca		William J. Maier*	Republican	
Steuben	1st	William H. Chamberlain	Republican	
Steuben	2nd	Jerry E. B. Santee*	Republican	
Suffolk	1st	John M. Lupton	Republican	
Suffolk	2nd	Orlando Hubbs*	Republican	
Sullivan		Edward Bisland*	Republican	
Tioga		Byram L. Winters	Republican	
Tompkins		William R. Gunderman	Republican	
Ulster	1st	Joseph M. Fowler	Republican	
Ulster	2nd	William D. Cunningham*	Republican	
Warren		William R. Waddell*	Republican	
Washington		Eugene R. Norton	Republican	
Wayne		Edson W. Hamn	Republican	
Westchester	1st	Woodson R. Oglesby	Ind. Dem.	
Westchester	2nd	J. Mayhew Wainwright*	Republican	
Westchester	3rd	James K. Apgar*	Republican	
Wyoming		Byron A. Nevins	Republican	
Yates		Leonidas D. West*	Republican	

=== Employees ===
- Clerk: Archie E. Baxter
- Assistant Clerk: Ray B. Smith
- Sergeant-at-Arms: Frank W. Johnston
- Stenographer: Henry C. Lammert

== Sources ==
- Official New York from Cleveland to Hughes by Charles Elliott Fitch (Hurd Publishing Co., New York and Buffalo, 1911, Vol. IV; see pg. 351ff for assemblymen; and 365f for senators)
- ODELL CLINCHES GRIP ON THE ASSEMBLY in NYT on November 9, 1905
- WADSWORTH NAMED BY 75 CAUCUS VOTES in NYT on January 3, 1906 [States erroneously that "Wadsworth will be the youngest Speaker the Assembly has ever had." The youngest Speaker ever was Edmund L. Pitts in 1867.]
- WADSWORTH'S FIRST DAY BRINGS FIGHT ON RULES in NYT on January 4, 1906
- SHAKE-UP BY WADSWORTH STIRS ASSEMBLY WRATH in NYT on January 11, 1906
