= 126th New York State Legislature =

New York state legislative session

←	125th	127th	→
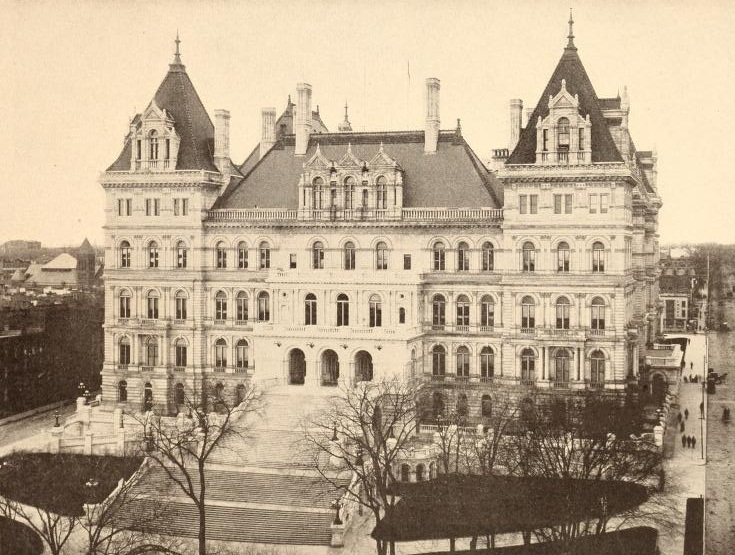
- New York State Capitol (1900)

Overview
- Legislative body: New York State Legislature
- Jurisdiction: New York, United States
- Term: January 1 – December 31, 1903

Senate
- Members: 50
- President: Lt. Gov. Frank W. Higgins (R)
- Temporary President: John Raines (R)
- Party control: Republican (28-22)

Assembly
- Members: 150
- Speaker: S. Frederick Nixon (R)
- Party control: Republican (89-61)

Sessions
- 1st: January 7 – April 23, 1903

The 126th New York State Legislature, consisting of the New York State Senate and the New York State Assembly, met from January 7 to April 23, 1903, during the third year of Benjamin B. Odell Jr.'s governorship, in Albany.

== Background ==
Under the provisions of the New York Constitution of 1894, 50 Senators and 150 assemblymen were elected in single-seat districts; senators for a two-year term, assemblymen for a one-year term. The senatorial districts were made up of entire counties, except New York County (twelve districts), Kings County (seven districts), Erie County (three districts) and Monroe County (two districts). The Assembly districts were made up of contiguous area, all within the same county.

At this time, there were two major political parties: the Republican Party and the Democratic Party. The Social Democratic Party, the Prohibition Party, the Socialist Labor Party, and a "Liberal Democratic" faction also nominated tickets.

== Elections ==
The 1902 New York state election, was held on November 4. Gov. Benjamin B. Odell Jr. was re-elected; and State Senator Frank W. Higgins was elected Lieutenant Governor; both Republicans. Of the other six statewide elective offices up for election, four were carried by the Republicans and two by the Democrats. The approximate party strength at this election, as expressed by the vote for Governor, was: Republicans 665,000; Democrats 656,000; Social Democrats 23,000; Prohibition 20,000; Socialist Labor 16,000; and Liberal Democrats 2,000.

== Sessions ==
The Legislature met for the regular session at the State Capitol in Albany on January 7, 1903; and adjourned on April 23.

S. Frederick Nixon (R) was re-elected Speaker.

John Raines (R) was elected president pro tempore of the State Senate with 25 votes for and 24 against him. Republican senators Edgar T. Brackett, Walter L. Brown and Nathaniel A. Elsberg voted against Raines.

On January 20, the Legislature re-elected Thomas C. Platt (R) to a second term as U.S. Senator from New York, for a six-year term beginning on March 4, 1903.

== State Senate ==
=== Districts ===
- 1st District: Richmond and Suffolk counties
- 2nd District: Queens and Nassau counties
- 3rd District: 1st, 2nd, 3rd, 4th, 5th and 6th Ward of Brooklyn, as constituted in 1894
- 4th District: 7th, 13th, 19th and 21st Ward of Brooklyn, as constituted in 1894
- 5th District: 8th, 10th, 12th and 30th Ward of Brooklyn, and the annexed former Town of Gravesend, as constituted in 1894
- 6th District: 9th, 11th, 20th and 22nd Ward of Brooklyn, as constituted in 1894
- 7th District: 14th, 15th, 16th and 17th Ward of Brooklyn, as constituted in 1894
- 8th District: 23rd, 24th, 25th and 29th Ward of Brooklyn; and the annexed former Town of Flatlands, as constituted in 1894
- 9th District: 18th, 26th, 27th and 28th Ward of Brooklyn, as constituted in 1894
- 10th, 11th, 12th, 13th, 14th, 15th, 16th, 17th, 18th, 19th, 20th and 21st District: Parts of the City of New York, defined geographically by their bordering streets, regardless of Wards or Assembly districts
- 22nd District: Westchester County
- 23rd District: Orange and Rockland counties
- 24th District: Columbia, Dutchess and Putnam and counties
- 25th District: Greene and Ulster counties
- 26th District: Chenango, Delaware and Sullivan counties
- 27th District: Fulton, Hamilton, Montgomery and Schoharie counties
- 28th District: Saratoga, Schenectady and Washington counties
- 29th District: Albany County
- 30th District: Rensselaer County
- 31st District: Clinton, Essex and Warren counties
- 32nd District: Franklin and St. Lawrence counties
- 33rd District: Otsego and Herkimer counties
- 34th District: Oneida County
- 35th District: Jefferson and Lewis counties
- 36th District: Onondaga County
- 37th District: Oswego and Madison counties
- 38th District: Broome, Cortland and Tioga counties
- 39th District: Cayuga and Seneca counties
- 40th District: Chemung, Schuyler and Tompkins counties
- 41st District: Steuben and Yates counties
- 42nd District: Ontario and Wayne counties
- 43rd District: 4th, 6th, 7th, 8th, 12th, 13th, 14th, 16th, 17th and 18th Ward of Rochester; and the towns of Brighton, Henrietta, Irondequoit, Menden, Penfield, Perinton, Pittsford, Rush and Webster, in Monroe County
- 44th District: 1st, 2nd, 3rd, 5th, 9th, 10th, 11th, 15th, 19th and 20th Ward of Rochester; and the towns of Chili, Clarkson, Gates, Greece, Hamlin, Ogden, Parma, Riga, Sweden and Wheatland, in Monroe County
- 45th District: Genesee, Niagara and Orleans counties
- 46th District: Allegany, Livingston and Wyoming counties
- 47th District: 1st, 2nd, 3rd, 6th, 15th, 19th, 20th, 21st, 22nd, 23rd and 24th Ward of Buffalo
- 48th District: 4th, 5th, 7th, 8th, 9th, 10th, 11th, 12th, 13th, 14th and 16th Ward of Buffalo
- 49th District: 17th, 18th and 25th Ward of the City of Buffalo; and all area in Erie County outside Buffalo
- 50th District: Cattaraugus and Chautauqua counties

Note: In 1897, New York County (the boroughs of Manhattan and Bronx), Kings County (the borough of Brooklyn), Richmond County (the borough of Staten Island) and the Western part of Queens County (the borough of Queens) were consolidated into the present-day City of New York. The Eastern part of Queens County (the non-consolidated part) was separated in 1899 as Nassau County. Parts of the 1st and 2nd Assembly districts of Westchester County were annexed by New York City in 1895, and became part of the Borough of the Bronx in 1898.

=== Members ===
The asterisk (*) denotes members of the previous Legislature who continued in office as members of this Legislature. Luke A. Keenan, Jotham P. Allds and Albert T. Fancher changed from the Assembly to the Senate.

Note: For brevity, the chairmanships omit the words "...the Committee on (the)..."

District	Senator	Party	Notes
1st	Edwin Bailey Jr.	Democrat	
2nd	Luke A. Keenan*	Democrat	
3rd	Thomas H. Cullen*	Democrat	
4th	Thomas C. Whitlock	Democrat	
5th	James H. McCabe*	Democrat	
6th	Walter C. Burton	Democrat	
7th	Patrick H. McCarren*	Democrat	
8th	Henry Marshall*	Republican	Chairman of Insurance
9th	Joseph Wagner*	Democrat	
10th	Daniel J. Riordan	Democrat	
11th	John C. Fitzgerald	Democrat	
12th	Samuel J. Foley*	Democrat	
13th	Bernard F. Martin*	Democrat	
14th	Thomas F. Grady*	Democrat	Minority Leader
15th	Nathaniel A. Elsberg*	Republican	Chairman of Codes
16th	vacant		Senator-elect Patrick F. Trainor (D) died on December 25, 1902
16th	Peter J. Dooling	Democrat	elected on January 27, 1903, to fill vacancy
17th	George W. Plunkitt*	Democrat	
18th	Victor J. Dowling*	Democrat	
19th	John W. Russell	Democrat	
20th	James J. Frawley	Democrat	
21st	John A. Hawkins	Democrat	
22nd	Charles P. McClelland	Democrat	seat vacated on August 21, upon appointment to the Board of General Appraisers
23rd	Louis F. Goodsell*	Republican	Chairman of Miscellaneous Corporations
24th	Henry S. Ambler*	Republican	Chairman of Agriculture
25th	Frank J. Lefevre	Republican	Chairman of Revision
26th	Jotham P. Allds*	Republican	
27th	Spencer K. Warnick	Republican	Chairman of Privileges and Elections
28th	Edgar T. Brackett*	Republican	Chairman of Judiciary
29th	James B. McEwan*	Republican	Chairman of Affairs of Villages
30th	William D. Barnes*	Republican	Chairman of Penal Institutions
31st	Spencer G. Prime*	Republican	Chairman of Banks
32nd	George R. Malby*	Republican	Chairman of Finance
33rd	Walter L. Brown	Republican	Chairman of Engrossed Bills
34th	William Townsend	Democrat	
35th	Elon R. Brown*	Republican	Chairman of Forest, Fish and Game
36th	Horace White*	Republican	Chairman of Affairs of Cities
37th	Francis H. Gates	Republican	Chairman of Military Affairs
38th	George E. Green*	Republican	Chairman of Taxation and Retrenchment
39th	Benjamin M. Wilcox*	Republican	Chairman of Railroads
40th	Edwin C. Stewart*	Republican	Chairman of Public Health
41st	Franklin D. Sherwood*	Republican	Chairman of Public Printing
42nd	John Raines*	Republican	elected President pro tempore; Chairman of Rules
43rd	Merton E. Lewis*	Republican	Chairman of Public Education
44th	William W. Armstrong*	Republican	Chairman of Internal Affairs
45th	Irving L'Hommedieu	Republican	Chairman of Trades and Manufactures
46th	Frederick C. Stevens	Republican	Chairman of Roads and Bridges
47th	Henry W. Hill*	Republican	Chairman of Commerce and Navigation
48th	Samuel J. Ramsperger*	Democrat	
49th	George Allen Davis*	Republican	Chairman of Canals
50th	Albert T. Fancher*	Republican	Chairman of Indian Affairs

=== Employees ===
- Clerk: James S. Whipple
- Sergeant-at-Arms: Charles R. Hotaling
- Assistant Sergeant-at-Arms: William W. Adams
- Doorkeeper: John E. Gorss
- Assistant Doorkeeper: Charles H. Bernard
- Stenographer: A. B. Sackett
- Assistant Clerk: Lafayette B. Gleason
- Journal Clerk: Ernest A. Fay
- Index Clerk: A. Miner Wellman

== State Assembly ==
=== Assemblymen ===
Note: For brevity, the chairmanships omit the words "...the Committee on (the)..."

District		Assemblymen	Party	Notes
Albany	1st	Charles W. Mead	Republican	
Albany	2nd	Abram S. Coon*	Republican	Chairman of Printed and Engrossed Bills
Albany	3rd	William V. Cooke	Democrat	
Albany	4th	William J. Grattan	Republican	
Allegany		Jesse S. Phillips*	Republican	Chairman of Codes
Broome	1st	James T. Rogers*	Republican	Majority Leader; Chairman of Ways and Means
Broome	2nd	Fred E. Allen*	Republican	
Cattaraugus	1st	Theodore Hayden	Republican	
Cattaraugus	2nd	James C. Sheldon	Republican	
Cayuga	1st	Ernest G. Treat*	Republican	Chairman of State Prisons
Cayuga	2nd	Charles J. Hewitt*	Republican	
Chautauqua	1st	J. Samuel Fowler*	Republican	Chairman of General Laws
Chautauqua	2nd	S. Frederick Nixon*	Republican	re-elected Speaker; Chairman of Rules
Chemung		Sherman Moreland	Republican	
Chenango		Edgar A. Pearsall	Republican	
Clinton		H. Wallace Knapp	Republican	
Columbia		Edward W. Scovill	Republican	
Cortland		Henry A. Dickinson*	Republican	Chairman of Taxation and Retrenchment
Delaware		James R. Cowan*	Republican	
Dutchess	1st	John T. Smith*	Republican	Chairman of Banks
Dutchess	2nd	Francis G. Landon*	Republican	Chairman of Public Education
Erie	1st	John H. Bradley*	Democrat	
Erie	2nd	Robert L. Cox	Republican	
Erie	3rd	Anthony F. Burke*	Democrat	
Erie	4th	Charles V. Lynch	Democrat	
Erie	5th	Charles W. Hinson	Democrat	
Erie	6th	George Ruehl*	Republican	
Erie	7th	John K. Patton*	Republican	Chairman of Canals
Erie	8th	Elijah Cook*	Republican	Chairman of Privileges and Elections
Essex		James M. Graeff*	Republican	Chairman of Agriculture
Franklin		Halbert D. Stevens*	Republican	Chairman of Affairs of Villages
Fulton and Hamilton		Clarence W. Smith*	Republican	
Genesee		S. Percy Hooker*	Republican	Chairman of Indian Affairs
Greene		Charles E. Nichols	Republican	
Herkimer		Samuel M. Allston*	Republican	Chairman of Fisheries and Game
Jefferson	1st	William A. Denison	Republican	
Jefferson	2nd	James A. Outterson*	Republican	
Kings	1st	John Hill Morgan*	Republican	Chairman of Judiciary
Kings	2nd	John McKeown*	Democrat	
Kings	3rd	James J. McInerney*	Democrat	
Kings	4th	John E. Bullwinkel	Democrat	
Kings	5th	Fortescue C. Metcalfe	Democrat	
Kings	6th	Frank J. Ulrich	Democrat	
Kings	7th	William Keegan	Democrat	
Kings	8th	John C. L. Daly*	Democrat	
Kings	9th	James J. Kehoe	Democrat	
Kings	10th	Francis J. Byrne	Democrat	
Kings	11th	William S. Shanahan	Democrat	
Kings	12th	John F. Kearney	Democrat	
Kings	13th	Thomas F. Mathews	Democrat	
Kings	14th	John B. Ferre*	Democrat	
Kings	15th	Harry H. Dale*	Democrat	
Kings	16th	Gustavus C. Weber*	Republican	
Kings	17th	Edward C. Dowling	Republican	
Kings	18th	Jacob D. Remsen*	Republican	Chairman of Commerce and Navigation
Kings	19th	John Wolf*	Democrat	
Kings	20th	Louis J. Zettler	Democrat	
Kings	21st	Edward A. Miller	Democrat	
Lewis		Lewis H. Stiles*	Republican	
Livingston		William Y. Robinson	Republican	
Madison		Avery M. Hoadley*	Republican	Chairman of Public Institutions
Monroe	1st	Martin Davis*	Republican	Chairman of Federal Relations
Monroe	2nd	George H. Smith*	Republican	
Monroe	3rd	Eugene J. Dwyer	Republican	
Monroe	4th	John Pallace Jr.	Democrat	
Montgomery		John W. Candee*	Republican	
New York	1st	Andrew J. Doyle	Democrat	
New York	2nd	Joseph P. Bourke*	Democrat	
New York	3rd	Dominick F. Mullaney	Democrat	
New York	4th	William H. Burns*	Democrat	
New York	5th	Edward R. Finch*	Republican	
New York	6th	Harry E. Oxford*	Democrat	
New York	7th	Peter P. Sherry	Democrat	
New York	8th	Isidor Cohn	Democrat	
New York	9th	Richard J. Butler	Democrat	
New York	10th	John F. McCullough*	Democrat	
New York	11th	Hugh Dolan	Democrat	
New York	12th	Edward Rosenstein	Democrat	
New York	13th	John C. Hackett	Democrat	
New York	14th	Henry W. Doll*	Democrat	
New York	15th	Thomas J. McManus	Democrat	
New York	16th	Samuel Prince*	Democrat	
New York	17th	John F. Curry	Democrat	
New York	18th	George P. Richter*	Democrat	
New York	19th	Charles F. Bostwick	Republican	
New York	20th	John H. Fitzpatrick*	Democrat	
New York	21st	Frederick E. Wood	Republican	
New York	22nd	William H. Hornidge	Democrat	
New York	23rd	Eugene J. McCarthy	Democrat	
New York	24th	Leo P. Ulmann*	Democrat	
New York	25th	Howard Conkling	Republican	previously a member from Warren Co.
New York	26th	Myron Sulzberger*	Democrat	
New York	27th	George B. Agnew	Republican	
New York	28th	John T. Dooling*	Democrat	
New York	29th	George B. Clark	Republican	
New York	30th	Gotthardt A. Litthauer*	Democrat	
New York	31st	Lewis A. Abrams	Democrat	
New York	32nd	Matthew F. Neville*	Democrat	
New York	33rd	James O. Farrell	Democrat	
New York	34th	William J. Ellis	Democrat	
New York	35th	Peter J. Everett	Democrat	
Niagara	1st	Joseph M. Hoffman	Democrat	
Niagara	2nd	John H. Leggett*	Republican	Chairman of Claims
Oneida	1st	Thomas A. Mortimer	Democrat	
Oneida	2nd	Fred J. Brill*	Republican	
Oneida	3rd	John C. Evans	Republican	
Onondaga	1st	James F. Williams*	Republican	
Onondaga	2nd	Frederick D. Traub*	Republican	Chairman of Public Printing
Onondaga	3rd	Martin L. Cadin*	Republican	
Onondaga	4th	Fred W. Hammond*	Republican	Chairman of Revision
Ontario		Jean L. Burnett*	Republican	Chairman of Affairs of Cities
Orange	1st	John Orr*	Republican	Chairman of Unfinished Business
Orange	2nd	Louis Bedell*	Republican	Chairman of Railroads
Orleans		Charles S. Bridgeman	Republican	
Oswego	1st	Thomas D. Lewis*	Republican	Chairman of Insurance
Oswego	2nd	Thomas M. Costello*	Republican	Chairman of labor and Industries
Otsego		John B. Conkling*	Republican	
Putnam		John R. Yale*	Republican	
Queens	1st	Joseph Sullivan	Democrat	
Queens	2nd	Francis X. Duer*	Democrat	
Queens and Nassau		George W. Doughty*	Republican	Chairman of Internal Affairs
Rensselaer	1st	John M. Chambers*	Republican	Chairman of Charitable and Religious Societies
Rensselaer	2nd	John J. McCarthy	Democrat	
Rensselaer	3rd	Charles W. Reynolds*	Republican	Chairman of Trades and Manufactures
Richmond		Charles J. McCormack	Democrat	
Rockland		Thomas Finegan	Democrat	
St. Lawrence	1st	Charles S. Plank*	Republican	Chairman of Excise
St. Lawrence	2nd	Edwin A. Merritt Jr.*	Republican	
Saratoga		George H. Whitney	Republican	
Schenectady		William W. Wemple	Republican	
Schoharie		George M. Palmer*	Democrat	Minority Leader
Schuyler		Olin T. Nye*	Republican	Chairman of Public Health
Seneca		Daniel W. Moran*	Republican	
Steuben	1st	Frank C. Platt*	Republican	Chairman of Soldiers' Home
Steuben	2nd	Gordon M. Patchin*	Republican	
Suffolk	1st	Willis A. Reeve*	Republican	
Suffolk	2nd	Orlando Hubbs	Republican	
Sullivan		John F. Simpson	Republican	
Tioga		Edwin S. Hanford*	Republican	Chairman of Public Lands and Forestry
Tompkins		George E. Monroe*	Republican	
Ulster	1st	Charles T. Coutant	Republican	
Ulster	2nd	Solomon P. Thorn	Republican	
Warren		Loyal L. Davis	Republican	
Washington		William H. Hughes*	Republican	Chairman of Military Affairs
Wayne		Addison P. Smith	Republican	
Westchester	1st	John J. Sloane*	Democrat	
Westchester	2nd	J. Mayhew Wainwright*	Republican	
Westchester	3rd	James K. Apgar*	Republican	Chairman of Electricity, Gas and Water Supply
Wyoming		Henry J. McNair*	Republican	
Yates		Cyrus C. Harvey	Republican	

=== Employees ===
- Clerk: Archie E. Baxter
- Sergeant-at-Arms: Frank W. Johnston
- Doorkeeper: Benjamin J. Sanger
- First Assistant Doorkeeper: Andrew Kehn
- Second Assistant Doorkeeper: Daniel Cameron Easton
- Stenographer: Henry C. Lammert
- Assistant Clerk: Ray B. Smith

== Sources ==
- Official New York from Cleveland to Hughes by Charles Elliott Fitch (Hurd Publishing Co., New York and Buffalo, 1911, Vol. IV; see pg. 346ff for assemblymen; and 365 for senators)
- The New York Red Book by Edgar L. Murlin (1903; see pg. 63–103 for senators' bios; between pg. 64 and 65 for senators' portraits; pg. 104–192 for assemblymen's bios; between pg. 128 and 129 for assemblymen's portraits; pg. 326 for senators; and pg. 451 for assemblymen)
- REPUBLICANS HOLD THE LEGISLATURE in NYT on November 5, 1902
- S. FRED NIXON FOR SPEAKER in NYT on January 7, 1903
- NEW YORK LEGISLATURE in NYT on January 8, 1903
