= 127th New York State Legislature =

New York state legislative session

←	126th	128th	→
- New York State Capitol (2009)

Overview
- Legislative body: New York State Legislature
- Jurisdiction: New York, United States
- Term: January 1 – December 31, 1904

Senate
- Members: 50
- President: Lt. Gov. Frank W. Higgins (R)
- Temporary President: John Raines (R)
- Party control: Republican (29-21)

Assembly
- Members: 150
- Speaker: S. Frederick Nixon (R)
- Party control: Republican (97-52-1)

Sessions
- 1st: January 6 – April 15, 1904

The 127th New York State Legislature, consisting of the New York State Senate and the New York State Assembly, met from January 6 to April 15, 1904, during the fourth year of Benjamin B. Odell Jr.'s governorship, in Albany.

== Background ==
Under the provisions of the New York Constitution of 1894, 50 Senators and 150 assemblymen were elected in single-seat districts; senators for a two-year term, assemblymen for a one-year term. The senatorial districts were made up of entire counties, except New York County (twelve districts), Kings County (seven districts), Erie County (three districts) and Monroe County (two districts). The Assembly districts were made up of contiguous area, all within the same county, .

At this time there were two major political parties: the Republican Party and the Democratic Party. The Socialist Party, the Prohibition Party and the Socialist Labor Party also nominated tickets.

== Elections ==
The 1903 New York state election, was held on November 3. The only statewide elective office up for election was a judgeship on the New York Court of Appeals. The incumbent Democrat Denis O'Brien was re-elected with Republican endorsement. The Socialist candidate received about 33,000 votes, the Prohibition candidate about 19,000.

== Sessions ==
The Legislature met for the regular session at the State Capitol in Albany on January 6, 1904; and adjourned on April 15.

S. Frederick Nixon (R) was re-elected Speaker.

== State Senate ==
=== Districts ===
- 1st District: Richmond and Suffolk counties
- 2nd District: Queens and Nassau counties
- 3rd District: 1st, 2nd, 3rd, 4th, 5th and 6th Ward of Brooklyn, as constituted in 1894
- 4th District: 7th, 13th, 19th and 21st Ward of Brooklyn, as constituted in 1894
- 5th District: 8th, 10th, 12th and 30th Ward of Brooklyn, and the annexed former Town of Gravesend, as constituted in 1894
- 6th District: 9th, 11th, 20th and 22nd Ward of Brooklyn, as constituted in 1894
- 7th District: 14th, 15th, 16th and 17th Ward of Brooklyn, as constituted in 1894
- 8th District: 23rd, 24th, 25th and 29th Ward of Brooklyn; and the annexed former Town of Flatlands, as constituted in 1894
- 9th District: 18th, 26th, 27th and 28th Ward of Brooklyn, as constituted in 1894
- 10th, 11th, 12th, 13th, 14th, 15th, 16th, 17th, 18th, 19th, 20th and 21st District: Parts of the City of New York, defined geographically by their bordering streets, regardless of Wards or Assembly districts
- 22nd District: Westchester County
- 23rd District: Orange and Rockland counties
- 24th District: Columbia, Dutchess and Putnam and counties
- 25th District: Greene and Ulster counties
- 26th District: Chenango, Delaware and Sullivan counties
- 27th District: Fulton, Hamilton, Montgomery and Schoharie counties
- 28th District: Saratoga, Schenectady and Washington counties
- 29th District: Albany County
- 30th District: Rensselaer County
- 31st District: Clinton, Essex and Warren counties
- 32nd District: Franklin and St. Lawrence counties
- 33rd District: Otsego and Herkimer counties
- 34th District: Oneida County
- 35th District: Jefferson and Lewis counties
- 36th District: Onondaga County
- 37th District: Oswego and Madison counties
- 38th District: Broome, Cortland and Tioga counties
- 39th District: Cayuga and Seneca counties
- 40th District: Chemung, Schuyler and Tompkins counties
- 41st District: Steuben and Yates counties
- 42nd District: Ontario and Wayne counties
- 43rd District: 4th, 6th, 7th, 8th, 12th, 13th, 14th, 16th, 17th and 18th Ward of Rochester; and the towns of Brighton, Henrietta, Irondequoit, Menden, Penfield, Perinton, Pittsford, Rush and Webster, in Monroe County
- 44th District: 1st, 2nd, 3rd, 5th, 9th, 10th, 11th, 15th, 19th and 20th Ward of Rochester; and the towns of Chili, Clarkson, Gates, Greece, Hamlin, Ogden, Parma, Riga, Sweden and Wheatland, in Monroe County
- 45th District: Genesee, Niagara and Orleans counties
- 46th District: Allegany, Livingston and Wyoming counties
- 47th District: 1st, 2nd, 3rd, 6th, 15th, 19th, 20th, 21st, 22nd, 23rd and 24th Ward of Buffalo
- 48th District: 4th, 5th, 7th, 8th, 9th, 10th, 11th, 12th, 13th, 14th and 16th Ward of Buffalo
- 49th District: 17th, 18th and 25th Ward of the City of Buffalo; and all area in Erie County outside Buffalo
- 50th District: Cattaraugus and Chautauqua counties

Note: In 1897, New York County (the boroughs of Manhattan and Bronx), Kings County (the borough of Brooklyn), Richmond County (the borough of Staten Island) and the Western part of Queens County (the borough of Queens) were consolidated into the present-day City of New York. The Eastern part of Queens County (the non-consolidated part) was separated in 1899 as Nassau County. Parts of the 1st and 2nd Assembly districts of Westchester County were annexed by New York City in 1895, and became part of the Borough of the Bronx in 1898.

=== Members ===
The asterisk (*) denotes members of the previous Legislature who continued in office as members of this Legislature.

District	Senator	Party	Notes
1st	Edwin Bailey Jr.*	Democrat	
2nd	Luke A. Keenan*	Democrat	
3rd	Thomas H. Cullen*	Democrat	
4th	Thomas C. Whitlock*	Democrat	
5th	James H. McCabe*	Democrat	
6th	Walter C. Burton*	Democrat	
7th	Patrick H. McCarren*	Democrat	
8th	Henry Marshall*	Republican	
9th	Joseph Wagner*	Democrat	
10th	Daniel J. Riordan*	Democrat	
11th	John C. Fitzgerald*	Democrat	
12th	Samuel J. Foley*	Democrat	
13th	Bernard F. Martin*	Democrat	
14th	Thomas F. Grady*	Democrat	Minority Leader
15th	Nathaniel A. Elsberg*	Republican	
16th	Peter J. Dooling*	Democrat	
17th	George W. Plunkitt*	Democrat	
18th	Victor J. Dowling*	Democrat	on November 8, 1904, elected to the New York Supreme Court
19th	John W. Russell*	Democrat	
20th	James J. Frawley*	Democrat	
21st	John A. Hawkins*	Democrat	
22nd	Francis M. Carpenter	Republican	elected to fill vacancy, in place of Charles P. McClelland
23rd	Louis F. Goodsell*	Republican	
24th	Henry S. Ambler*	Republican	
25th	Frank J. Lefevre*	Republican	
26th	Jotham P. Allds*	Republican	
27th	Spencer K. Warnick*	Republican	
28th	Edgar T. Brackett*	Republican	
29th	James B. McEwan*	Republican	
30th	William D. Barnes*	Republican	
31st	Spencer G. Prime*	Republican	
32nd	George R. Malby*	Republican	
33rd	Walter L. Brown*	Republican	
34th	William Townsend*	Democrat	
35th	Elon R. Brown*	Republican	
36th	Horace White*	Republican	
37th	Francis H. Gates*	Republican	
38th	George E. Green*	Republican	
39th	Benjamin M. Wilcox*	Republican	
40th	Edwin C. Stewart*	Republican	
41st	Franklin D. Sherwood*	Republican	
42nd	John Raines*	Republican	President pro tempore
43rd	Merton E. Lewis*	Republican	
44th	William W. Armstrong*	Republican	
45th	Irving L'Hommedieu*	Republican	
46th	Frederick C. Stevens*	Republican	
47th	Henry W. Hill*	Republican	
48th	Samuel J. Ramsperger*	Democrat	
49th	George Allen Davis*	Republican	
50th	Albert T. Fancher*	Republican	

=== Employees ===
- Clerk: James S. Whipple
- Sergeant-at-Arms: Charles R. Hotaling
- Assistant Sergeant-at-Arms: F. H. Adams
- Doorkeeper: Christopher Warren
- Assistant Doorkeeper: Charles H. Barnard
- Stenographer: A. B. Sackett

== State Assembly ==
=== Assemblymen ===
District		Assemblymen	Party	Notes
Albany	1st	Charles W. Mead*	Republican	
Albany	2nd	Abram S. Coon*	Republican	
Albany	3rd	Ellsworth Carr	Independent	
Albany	4th	William J. Grattan*	Republican	
Allegany		Jesse S. Phillips*	Republican	
Broome	1st	James T. Rogers*	Republican	Majority Leader
Broome	2nd	Fred E. Allen*	Republican	
Cattaraugus	1st	Theodore Hayden*	Republican	
Cattaraugus	2nd	James C. Sheldon*	Republican	
Cayuga	1st	Judson W. Hapeman	Republican	
Cayuga	2nd	Charles J. Hewitt*	Republican	
Chautauqua	1st	Arthur C. Wade	Republican	
Chautauqua	2nd	S. Frederick Nixon*	Republican	re-elected Speaker
Chemung		Sherman Moreland*	Republican	
Chenango		Edgar A. Pearsall*	Republican	
Clinton		H. Wallace Knapp*	Republican	
Columbia		Edward W. Scovill*	Republican	
Cortland		Henry A. Dickinson*	Republican	
Delaware		James R. Cowan*	Republican	
Dutchess	1st	John T. Smith*	Republican	
Dutchess	2nd	Robert W. Chanler	Democrat	
Erie	1st	Charles J. Quinn	Democrat	
Erie	2nd	Robert L. Cox*	Republican	
Erie	3rd	Anthony F. Burke*	Democrat	
Erie	4th	Charles V. Lynch*	Democrat	
Erie	5th	Charles F. Brooks	Republican	
Erie	6th	George Ruehl*	Republican	
Erie	7th	John K. Patton*	Republican	
Erie	8th	Elijah Cook*	Republican	
Essex		James M. Graeff*	Republican	
Franklin		Charles R. Matthews	Republican	
Fulton and Hamilton		Frank C. Wood	Republican	
Genesee		S. Percy Hooker*	Republican	
Greene		Charles E. Nichols*	Republican	
Herkimer		Abram B. Steele	Republican	
Jefferson	1st	William A. Denison*	Republican	
Jefferson	2nd	J. Frank La Rue	Rep./Dem.	
Kings	1st	Thomas O'Neill	Rep./Cit. U.	
Kings	2nd	John McKeown*	Democrat	
Kings	3rd	Thomas P. Reilly	Democrat	
Kings	4th	John E. Bullwinkel*	Democrat	
Kings	5th	Fortescue C. Metcalfe*	Democrat	
Kings	6th	Frank J. Ulrich*	Democrat	
Kings	7th	William Keegan*	Democrat	
Kings	8th	John C. L. Daly*	Democrat	
Kings	9th	James J. Kehoe*	Democrat	
Kings	10th	Frank H. Cothren	Rep./Cit. U.	
Kings	11th	William S. Shanahan*	Democrat	
Kings	12th	Oscar L. Thonet	Rep./Cit. U.	
Kings	13th	Thomas F. Mathews*	Democrat	
Kings	14th	John B. Ferre*	Democrat	
Kings	15th	Harry H. Dale*	Democrat	
Kings	16th	Richard C. Perry	Republican	
Kings	17th	Edward C. Dowling*	Rep./Cit. U.	
Kings	18th	Jacob D. Remsen*	Republican	
Kings	19th	John Wolf*	Democrat	
Kings	20th	Louis J. Zettler*	Democrat	
Kings	21st	Edward A. Miller*	Dem./Cit. U.	
Lewis		H. Elias Slocum	Republican	
Livingston		William Y. Robinson*	Republican	
Madison		Robert J. Fish	Republican	
Monroe	1st	Martin Davis*	Republican	
Monroe	2nd	Charles E. Ogden	Republican	
Monroe	3rd	Charles E. Callahan	Republican	
Monroe	4th	John Pallace Jr.*	Democrat	
Montgomery		William B. Charles	Republican	
New York	1st	Thomas B. Caughlan	Democrat	
New York	2nd	Al Smith	Democrat	
New York	3rd	Anthony J. Barrett	Democrat	
New York	4th	William H. Burns*	Democrat	
New York	5th	Edward R. Finch*	Rep./Cit. U.	
New York	6th	Charles Anderson	Democrat	
New York	7th	Peter P. Sherry*	Democrat	
New York	8th	Bennett E. Siegelstein	Democrat	
New York	9th	Patrick H. Bird	Democrat	
New York	10th	William Sohmer	Democrat	
New York	11th	Hugh Dolan*	Democrat	
New York	12th	Edward Rosenstein*	Democrat	
New York	13th	John C. Hackett*	Democrat	
New York	14th	Albert C. Wiegand	Democrat	
New York	15th	Thomas J. McManus*	Democrat	
New York	16th	Samuel Prince*	Democrat	
New York	17th	John F. Curry*	Democrat	
New York	18th	George P. Richter*	Democrat	
New York	19th	Charles F. Bostwick*	Rep./Cit. U.	
New York	20th	Peter L. Fitzsimons	Democrat	
New York	21st	Joseph H. Adams	Republican	
New York	22nd	William H. Hornidge*	Democrat	
New York	23rd	Josiah T. Newcomb	Rep./Cit. U.	
New York	24th	John F. Carew	Democrat	
New York	25th	Ezra P. Prentice	Rep./Cit. U.	
New York	26th	Charles Leopold	Democrat	
New York	27th	George B. Agnew*	Rep./Cit. U.	
New York	28th	Emanuel S. Cahn	Democrat	
New York	29th	Frederic E. Perham	Rep./Cit. U.	
New York	30th	Gotthardt A. Litthauer*	Democrat	
New York	31st	Ernest H. Wallace	Republican	
New York	32nd	Julius Brosen	Democrat	
New York	33rd	James O. Farrell*	Democrat	
New York	34th	William J. Ellis*	Democrat	
New York	35th	Peter J. Everett*	Democrat	
Niagara	1st	George F. Thompson	Republican	
Niagara	2nd	John H. Leggett*	Republican	
Oneida	1st	Thomas A. Mortimer*	Democrat	
Oneida	2nd	Jay H. Pratt	Republican	
Oneida	3rd	John C. Evans*	Republican	
Onondaga	1st	Frank X. Wood	Republican	
Onondaga	2nd	Edward Schoeneck	Republican	
Onondaga	3rd	Martin L. Cadin*	Republican	
Onondaga	4th	Fred W. Hammond*	Republican	
Ontario		Jean L. Burnett*	Republican	
Orange	1st	John Orr*	Republican	
Orange	2nd	Louis Bedell*	Republican	
Orleans		Charles S. Bridgeman*	Republican	
Oswego	1st	Thomas D. Lewis*	Republican	
Oswego	2nd	Fred G. Whitney	Republican	
Otsego		John B. Conkling*	Republican	
Putnam		John R. Yale*	Republican	
Queens	1st	Joseph Sullivan*	Democrat	
Queens	2nd	William A. De Groot	Republican	
Queens and Nassau		William W. Cocks	Republican	on November 8, 1904, elected to the 59th U.S. Congress
Rensselaer	1st	Frank L. Stevens	Republican	
Rensselaer	2nd	William V. Donovan	Democrat	
Rensselaer	3rd	Calvin A. Gardner	Republican	
Richmond		George Bechtel	Democrat	
Rockland		Matthew Hurd	Republican	
St. Lawrence	1st	Charles S. Plank*	Republican	
St. Lawrence	2nd	Edwin A. Merritt Jr.*	Republican	
Saratoga		George H. Whitney*	Republican	
Schenectady		William W. Wemple*	Republican	
Schoharie		George M. Palmer*	Democrat	Minority Leader
Schuyler		Olin T. Nye*	Republican	
Seneca		John Francis Crosby	Republican	
Steuben	1st	Frank C. Platt*	Republican	
Steuben	2nd	Jerry E. B. Santee	Republican	
Suffolk	1st	Willis A. Reeve*	Republican	
Suffolk	2nd	Orlando Hubbs*	Republican	
Sullivan		John F. Simpson*	Republican	
Tioga		Edwin S. Hanford*	Republican	
Tompkins		George E. Monroe*	Republican	
Ulster	1st	Charles T. Coutant*	Republican	
Ulster	2nd	William D. Cunningham	Republican	
Warren		Loyal L. Davis*	Republican	
Washington		James S. Parker	Republican	elected on December 29, 1903
Wayne		Addison P. Smith*	Republican	
Westchester	1st	George N. Rigby	Republican	
Westchester	2nd	J. Mayhew Wainwright*	Republican	
Westchester	3rd	James K. Apgar*	Republican	
Wyoming		Elmer E. Charles	Republican	
Yates		Cyrus C. Harvey*	Republican	

=== Employees ===
- Clerk: Archie E. Baxter
- Assistant Clerk: Ray B. Smith
- Sergeant-at-Arms: Frank W. Johnston
- Doorkeeper: Frank Sherer Jr.
- First Assistant Doorkeeper: Andrew Kehn
- Second Assistant Doorkeeper: D. Cameron Easton
- Stenographer: Henry C. Lammert

== Sources ==
- Official New York from Cleveland to Hughes by Charles Elliott Fitch (Hurd Publishing Co., New York and Buffalo, 1911, Vol. IV; see pg. 348f for assemblymen; and 365 for senators)
- COUNT ON LEGISLATURE in NYT on November 5, 1903
- THE LEGISLATURE READY in NYT on January 6, 1904
- NIXON OPPOSES ODELL in NYT on January 7, 1904
