= John A. Hawkins (New York politician) =

American politician

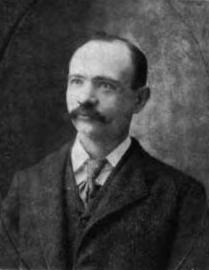
John A. Hawkins (1903)

John A. Hawkins (October 27, 1864 – February 22, 1941) was an American politician from New York.

== Early life ==
Hawkins' family removed to New York City when John was still a child. He left school at 12 years old, worked as an office-boy in a law office for two years, and then became a printer. While working he attended evening grammar and high schools.

== Career ==
Hawkins was a member of the New York State Senate (21st D.) from 1903 to 1906, sitting in the 126th, 127th, 128th and 129th New York State Legislatures. He later served as Assistant Commissioner of Public Works in the Bronx.

== Legacy ==
He died on February 22, 1941, at his home at 441 East 136th Street in the Bronx.

== Sources ==
- Official New York from Cleveland to Hughes by Charles Elliott Fitch (Hurd Publishing Co., New York and Buffalo, 1911, Vol. IV; pg. 365)
- The New York Red Book by Edgar L. Murlin (1903; pg. 82)
- TELLS MORE ABUSES IN CONDEMNING LAND in NYT on December 23, 1909
- JOHN A. HAWKINS DIES; EX-STATE SENATOR, 76 in NYT on February 23, 1941

New York State Senate
Preceded by Joseph P. Hennessy	New York State Senate; 21st District; 1903–1906	Succeeded by James Owens
