= John R. Yale =

American businessman and politician

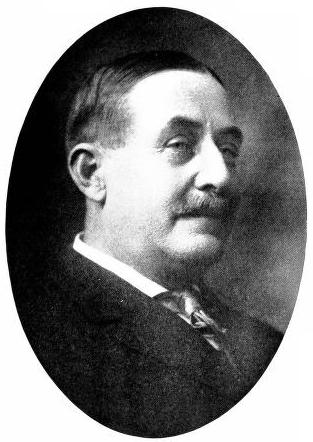
John R. Yale (1916)

John Reed Yale (May 8, 1855, in Patterson, Putnam County, New York – July 17, 1925, in Albany, New York) was an American businessman and politician from New York. He served as President of Brewster Water Works and Chairman of the Committee on Railroads.

== Life ==
He was the son of Belden Yale (born 1821) and Margaret (Glennen) Yale, members of the Yale family. He was a real estate expert and assessor; and engaged in a variety of businesses, among them the construction of roads and the Brewster water supply system.

In 1904 John R. Yale was chosen to be a delegate to the Republican National Convention which nominated Theodore Roosevelt for President. He was a member of the Masonic Fraternity, the Odd Fellows, Elks and the New York Young Republican Club.

Yale was a member of the New York State Assembly (Putnam Co.) in 1902, 1903, 1904, 1905, 1906, 1907, 1908, 1909, 1910, 1911, 1912 and 1913; and was Chairman of the Committee on Electricity, Gas and Water Supply from 1908 to 1910, and in 1912.

He was Vice Chairman of the New York State Commission for the Panama–Pacific International Exposition in 1915. He was again a member of the State Assembly in 1921, 1922, 1923, 1924 and 1925; and was Chairman of the Committee on Railroads in 1922.

== Family ==
On May 8, 1880, Yale married Alice Penny (born 1858), and they had five daughters.

His daughter Florence Louise Yale (1890-1933) married to Capt. Philip D. Hoyt, the New York First Deputy Police Commissioner, father of modern traffic control in New York, and Princeton graduate. He was also a Committee Expert under Secretary Herbert Hoover.

His father, Morgan Howes Hoyt, was County Chairman for the Democrats and launched President Franklin Delano Roosevelt's political career during his first campaign as Senator in 1910.

He was the publisher, editor, and co-owner of the Beacon Standard and Matteawan Journal, important Democratic journals at the time, and became a lifelong friend and correspondent of President FDR from the White House, to which he would refer Hoyt as "Morgan Hoyt has been introducing me for 100 years", and his featured in the President's personal letters.

James Forrestal, the 1st United States Secretary of Defense worked under him at his journal, and became a close friend of his son Philip at Princeton.

Yale died on July 17, 1925, in the Albany Hospital in Albany, New York, after a cancer operation; and was buried at the Milltown Cemetery in Brewster, New York.

== Sources ==
- The New York Red Book by Edgar L. Murlin (1903; pg. 190)
- Official New York from Cleveland to Hughes by Charles Elliott Fitch (Hurd Publishing Co., New York and Buffalo, 1911, Vol. IV; pg. 346f, 349, 351f, 354, 356f, 359 and 361)
- State of New York at the Panama–Pacific International Exposition, San Francisco, California, 1915 (Albany, 1916; pg. 23f)
- JOHN R. YALE, DEAN OF ASSEMBLY, DEAD in NYT on July 18, 1925 (subscription required)
- Yale genealogy

New York State Assembly
Preceded by William W. Everett	New York State Assembly; Putnam County; 1902–1913	Succeeded by Hamilton Fish III
Preceded by John P. Donohoe	New York State Assembly; Putnam County; 1921–1925	Succeeded by D. Mallory Stephens
