= William D. Barnes =

American politician

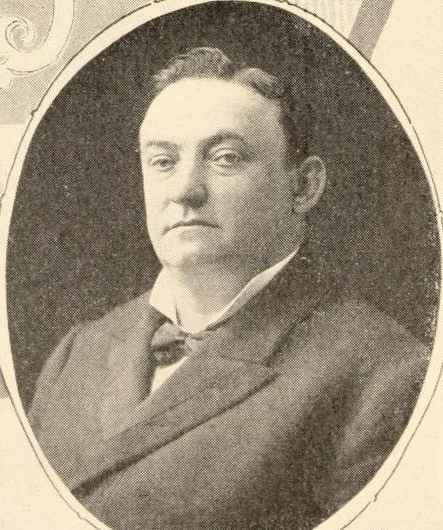
William D. Barnes (1902)

William Dillon Barnes (April 4, 1856 – July 1927) was an American manufacturer and politician from New York.

== Life ==
He was born on April 4, 1856, in Columbia County, New York. He attended the public schools in Hudson. In 1879, he began the manufacture of cotton cloth in Brainard, and in 1883 established a paper mill there.

Barnes was a member of the New York State Senate (30th D.) from 1902 to 1906, sitting in the 125th, 126th, 127th, 128th and 129th New York State Legislatures.

He died in July 1927 in Garden City, Nassau County, New York.

== Sources ==
New York State Senate
Preceded by Michael Russell	New York State Senate; 30th District; 1902–1906	Succeeded by H. Wallace Knapp
