= Henry M. Sage =

American politician (1868–1933)

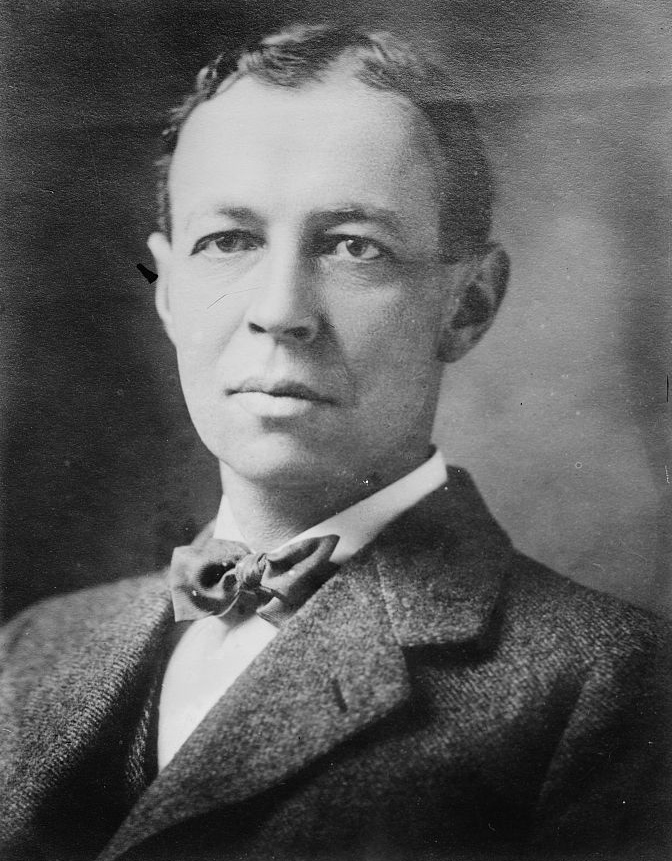
- Sage, ca. 1915

Member of the New York State Senate
- In office 1919–1920
- Preceded by: George H. Whitney
- Succeeded by: Frank L. Wiswall
- In office 1911–1918
- Preceded by: William J. Grattan
- Succeeded by: James E. Towner

Member of the New York State Assembly
- In office January 1, 1899 – December 31, 1899
- Preceded by: George W. Stedman
- Succeeded by: Edward McCreary

Personal details
- Born: Henry Manning Sage; May 18, 1868 Albany, New York, U.S.
- Died: September 25, 1933 (aged 65) Menands, New York, U.S.
- Party: Republican
- Spouses: Anna Wheeler Ward (m. 1895; div. 1908) Cornelia McClure Cogswell (m. 1911)
- Children: 4, including Kay
- Relatives: Henry W. Sage (grandfather); Paul Fenimore Cooper (nephew)
- Education: The Albany Academy; Yale College

Henry Manning Sage (May 18, 1868 in Albany, New York – September 25, 1933 in Menands, Albany County, New York) was an American senator and politician from New York. He became Chairman of the State Hospital Development Commission.

== Early life ==
Henry Manning Sage was born in Albany, New York on May 18, 1868. He was the son of Dean Sage (1841–1902) and Sarah Augusta (née Manning) Sage and the grandson of Henry W. Sage (1814–1897). He was also distantly related to Congressman Russell Sage, family of Colonel Ira Yale Sage.

He attended The Albany Academy, and graduated from Yale College in 1890. His sister, Susan Linn Sage (1866–1933) married James Fenimore Cooper (1858–1938), grandson of prolific author James Fenimore Cooper (1789–1851). Susan and James were the parents of Paul Fenimore Cooper (1899–1970), an author and Henry's nephew.

== Career ==
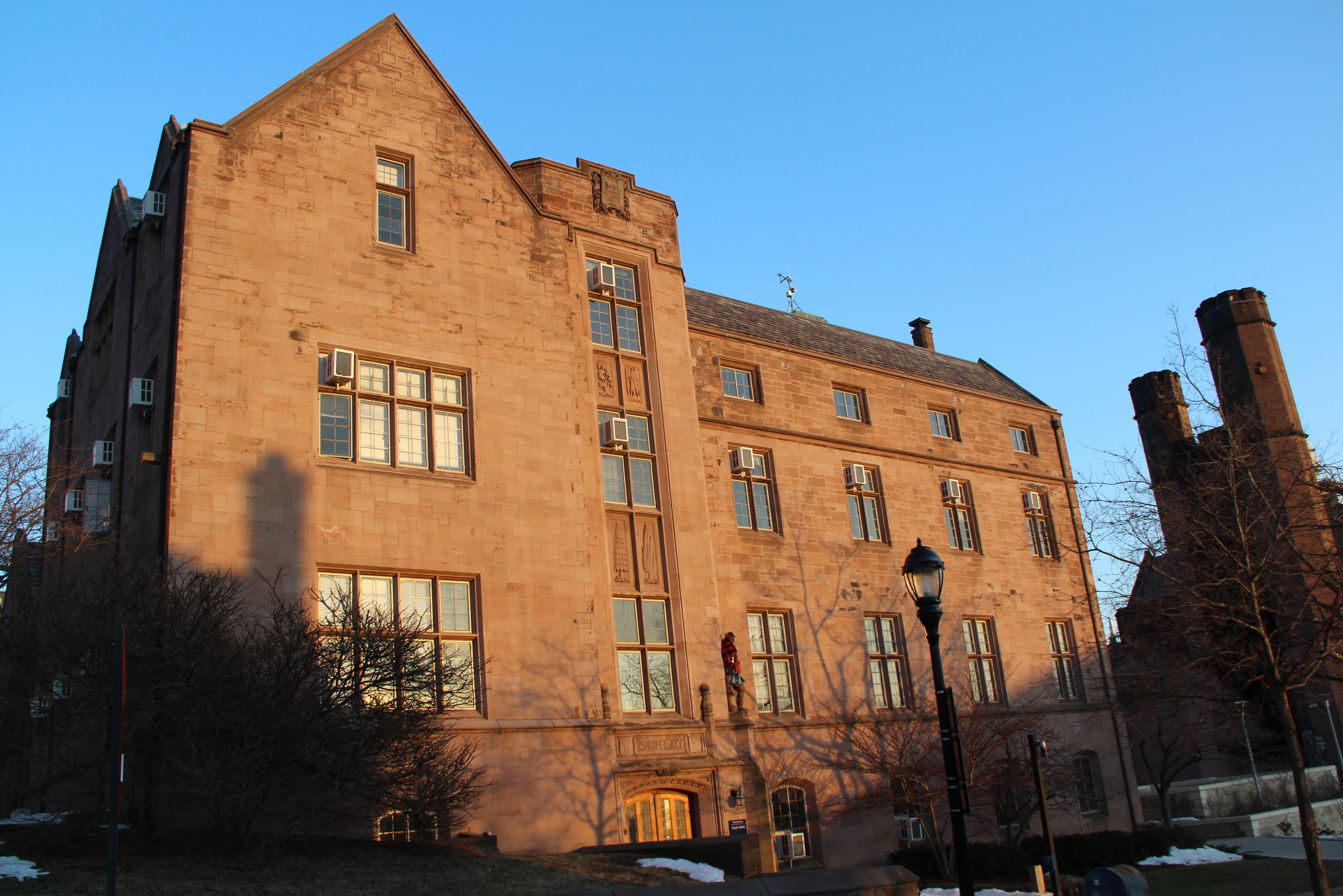
Sage Hall at Yale, completed in 1924

After graduation from Yale, he began working in the lumber business, like his father and grandfather, eventually becoming president of Sage Land and Development Company, as well as a director of several banks and insurance companies in Albany. The family later donated the funds to build Sage Hall at Yale, at the time, the largest forestry school on the continent.

Sage was a Republican member of the New York State Assembly (Albany Co., 4th D.) in 122nd New York State Legislature, serving from January 1 until December 31, 1899.

Later from January 1, 1911 until December 31, 1920, Sage was a member of the New York State Senate, sitting in the 134th, 135th, 136th, 137th, 138th, 139th, 140th, 141st (all eight 28th D.), 142nd and 143rd New York State Legislatures (both 30th D.). While in the State Senate, he served as Chairman of the Finance Committee from 1914 to 1920.

Afterwards he was Chairman of the State Hospital Development Commission. He was a delegate to the 1916, 1920 and 1924 Republican National Conventions.

In 1932, he wrote to The New York Times about New York's finances and warning against increasing taxes.

== Personal life ==
On October 29, 1895, he married Anna Wheeler Ward (b. 1875). Anna was the daughter of Dr. Samuel Baldwin Ward, an Albany surgeon. Together, they were the parents of two daughters:

- Anne Erskine Sage (1897–1934), who married a Swiss Army Officer.
- Princess Katherine Linn Sage (1898–1963), an artist who married Prince Ranieri di San Faustino in 1925.

Henry and Anna Sage were divorced in 1908. On May 11, 1911, he married Cornelia McClure Cogswell (1880–1972). She was the daughter of Ledyard and Cornelia (née McClure) Cogswell. Together, they were the parents of two more children:

- Cornelia Sage, who became engaged, and wed, to John Cotton Walcott in 1935.
- Henry M. Sage Jr.

He died on September 25, 1933, at his home "Fernbrook" in Menands, New York, of a heart attack after having been ill for several years. He was buried at the Albany Rural Cemetery in Menands.

=== Board of trustees ===
In March 1900, he was elected a trustee of Cornell University, to fill the seat which had been vacant since the death of his grandfather Henry W. Sage (1814–1897) who had been chairman of the board of trustees for more than 20 years. Henry M. Sage and his uncle William H. Sage (1844–1924) resigned from the board of trustees in protest against the burial of Willard Fiske (1831–1904) in the Sage Chapel.

== Sources ==
Notes

Sources

- Suther, Judith D. A House of Her Own: Kay Sage, Solitary Surrealist. Lincoln: University of Nebraska Press, 1997.
- Official New York from Cleveland to Hughes by Charles Elliott Fitch (Hurd Publishing Co., New York and Buffalo, 1911, Vol. IV; pg. 340 and 367)
- Sage genealogy at Gen Forum
- Albany Rural Cemetery, notable burials

New York State Assembly
Preceded by George W. Stedman	New York State Assembly; Albany County, 4th District; 1899	Succeeded by Edward McCreary
New York State Senate
Preceded by William J. Grattan	New York State Senate; 28th District; 1911–1918	Succeeded by James E. Towner
Preceded by George H. Whitney	New York State Senate; 30th District; 1919–1920	Succeeded by Frank L. Wiswall
