= Victor J. Dowling =

American politician

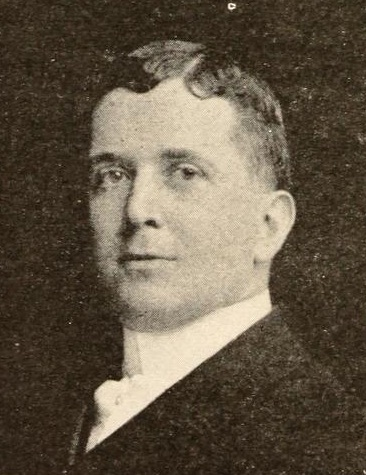
Victor J. Dowling (1903)

Victor James Dowling (July 20, 1866 – March 23, 1934) was an American lawyer and politician from New York.

== Life ==
He was born on July 20, 1866, in New York City. He attended parochial schools and De La Salle Institute, and graduated from Manhattan College. He graduated from New York University School of Law in 1887, was admitted to the bar, and practiced in New York City. In 1891, he married Mary Agnes Ford.

Dowling was a member of the New York State Assembly (New York Co., 16th D.) in 1894.

He was a member of the New York State Senate (18th D.) from 1901 to 1904, sitting in the 124th, 125th, 126th and 127th New York State Legislatures.

He was a justice of the New York Supreme Court from 1905 to 1931, sat on the Appellate Division from 1911 to 1931, and was Presiding Justice of the First Department from 1927 to 1931. He resigned from the bench on February 28, 1931, and resumed his private law practice.

Dowling was a national director of the Knights of Columbus and a charter member of the fourth degree. He was a Knight of St. Gregory, a Papal Chamberlain of the Cape and Sword, a Knight Grand Cross of the Order of St. Lazarus, a knight of the Legion of Honor, and a knight of the Order of the Crown of Italy.

He died on March 23, 1934, of "cerebral hemorrhage".

== Sources ==
New York State Assembly
Preceded by Joseph C. Wolff	New York State Assembly; New York County, 16th District; 1894	Succeeded by Charles Steinberg
New York State Senate
Preceded by Maurice Featherson	New York State Senate; 18th District; 1901–1904	Succeeded by Jacob Marks
