= G.F. Harvey Company =

Former American pharmaceutical manufacturer

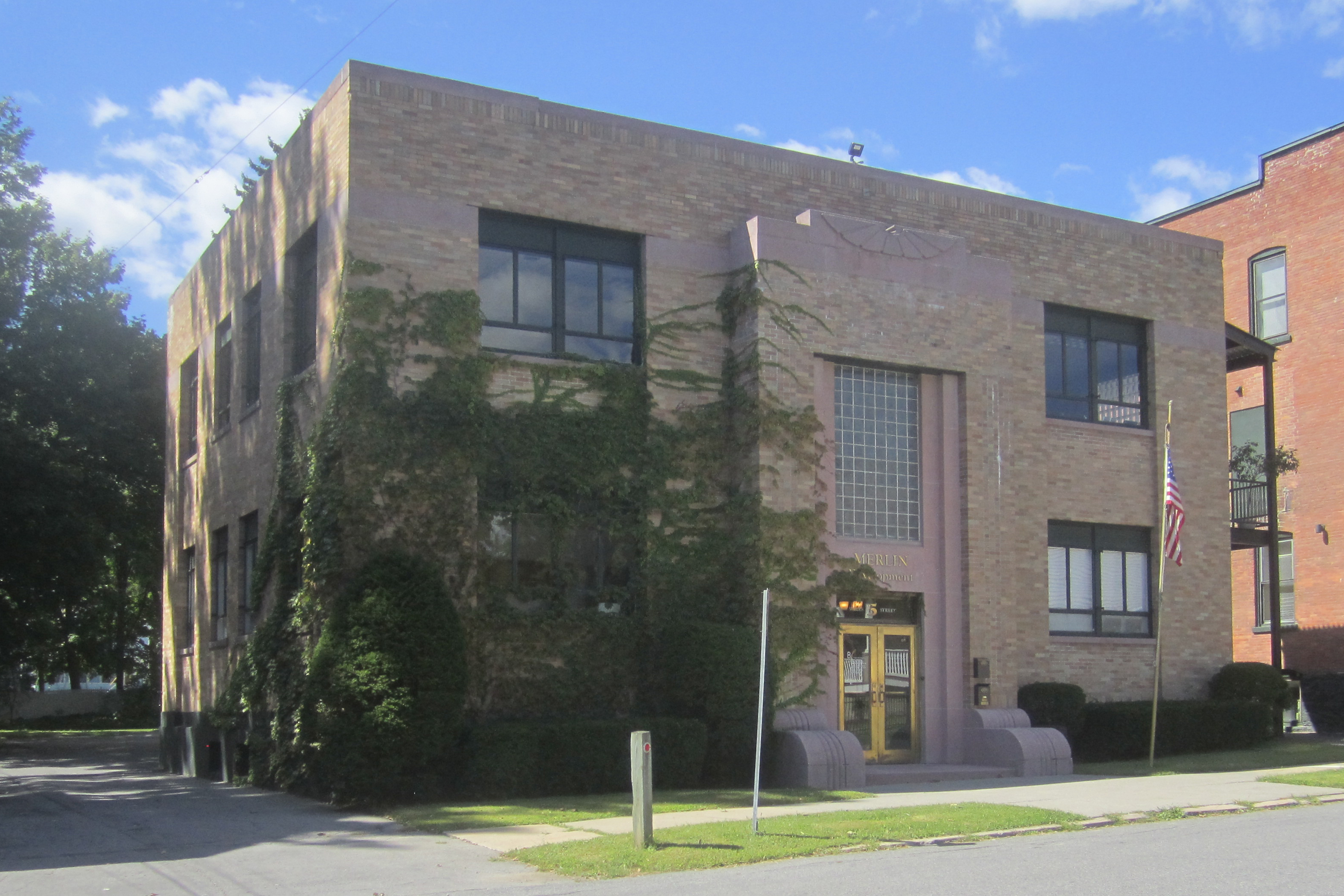
Former G.F. Harvey Company Headquarters, 5 Wells Street, Saratoga Springs NY (1939)

The G.F. Harvey Company was a pharmaceutical manufacturer headquartered in Saratoga Springs, New York between 1890 and 1958.

== History ==
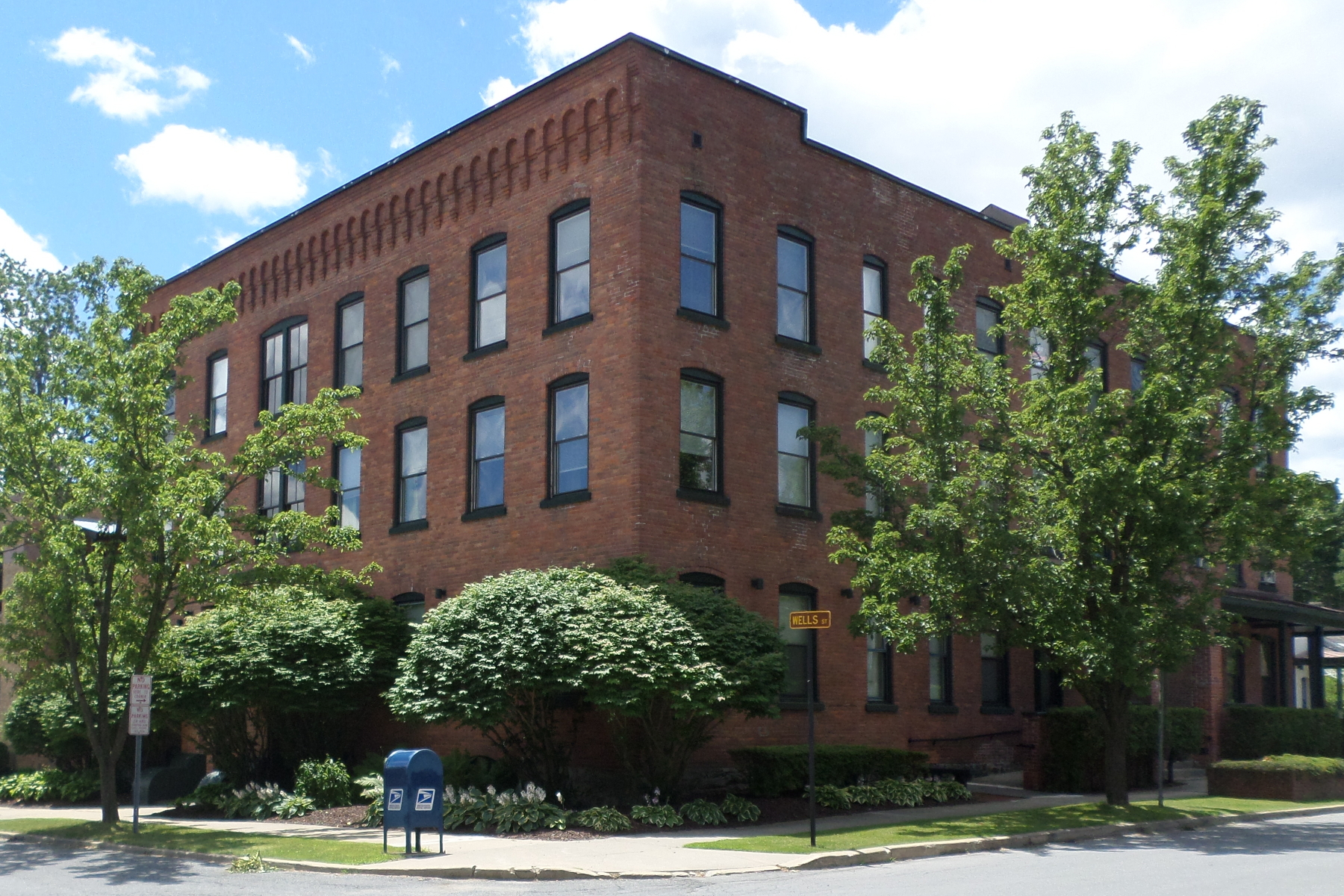
Former factory of G.F. Harvey Company in 2016

The company was started around 1880 by George F. Harvey, originally from Vermont, who moved to Saratoga Springs and began operations out of his home on Church Street. There he developed and improved machinery to manufacture medicine in pill form, a major improvement on the then-common liquids and powders. In 1889 Harvey went into business with Sidney Rickard and New York State Senator Edgar T. Brackett. The three incorporated the G.F. Harvey Company with a capital of $250,000 and constructed a three-story building on Waterbury Street in Saratoga Springs for manufacturing. By 1907 the company employed 100 people plus 66 traveling salesmen.

In 1939 Harvey built a new administration and research building on Wells Street around the corner from the manufacturing facility.

The company had a distribution center in Peoria, Illinois, which suffered a disastrous fire in 1943. It also had local agents in Mille Roches, Ontario and London, England.

In 1958 Harvey was sold and became the Bard Saratoga Labs of Bard Pharmaceuticals. It finally ceased operation in 1960.

== Products ==
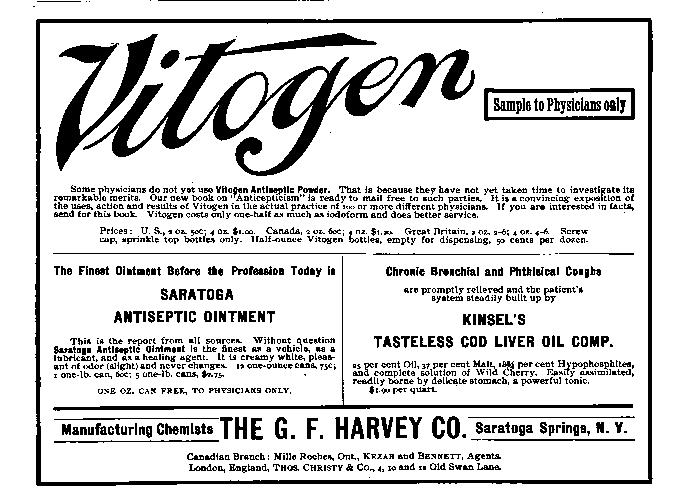
1902 G.F.Harvey advertisement

By 1895 the company manufactured "five hundred kinds of pills, granules, tablet triturates, fluid extracts, powders, suppositories, tinctures, syrups and elixirs. The company also carried a line of surgical instruments and physicians' supplies." A popular product was "Saratoga Ointment", a topical medication containing zinc oxide, boric acid, and eucalyptol in a suet base.
