= 130th New York State Legislature =

New York state legislative session

| ← | 129th | 131st | → |
- New York State Capitol (2009)

Overview
- Legislative body: New York State Legislature
- Jurisdiction: New York, United States
- Term: January 1 – December 31, 1907

Senate
- Members: 51
- President: Lt. Gov. Lewis Stuyvesant Chanler (D)
- Temporary President: John Raines (R)
- Party control: Republican (32-19)

Assembly
- Members: 150
- Speaker: James Wolcott Wadsworth Jr. (R)
- Party control: Republican (99-51)

Sessions
- 1st: January 2 – June 26, 1907
- 2nd: July 8 – 26, 1907

The 130th New York State Legislature, consisting of the New York State Senate and the New York State Assembly, met from January 2 to July 26, 1907, during the first year of Charles Evans Hughes's governorship, in Albany.

== Background ==
Under the provisions of the New York Constitution of 1894, re-apportioned in 1906, 51 Senators and 150 assemblymen were elected in single-seat districts; senators for a two-year term, assemblymen for a one-year term. The senatorial districts were made up of entire counties, except New York County (twelve districts), Kings County (eight districts), Erie County (three districts) and Monroe County (two districts). The Assembly districts were made up of contiguous area, all within the same county.

On April 27, 1906, the Legislature re-apportioned the Senate districts, increasing the number to 51. The apportionment was then contested in the courts.

The Legislature also re-apportioned the number of assemblymen per county. Nassau County was separated from the remainder of Queens County; Albany, Broome, Cattaraugus, Cayuga, Onondaga, Oswego and Rensselaer counties lost one seat each; Erie, Monroe and Westchester gained one each; and Kings and Queens counties gained two each.

On August 13, 1906, the new Senate apportionment was upheld by Supreme Court Justice Howard.

At this time there were two major political parties: the Republican Party and the Democratic Party. The Democrats and the Independence League nominated a fusion ticket headed by William Randolph Hearst. The Socialist Party, the Prohibition Party and the Socialist Labor Party also nominated tickets.

== Elections ==
The 1906 New York state election, was held on November 6. Republican Charles Evans Hughes was elected Governor with about 749,000 votes against 691,000 for Hearst. The other six statewide elective offices were carried by the nominees on the Democratic/Independence League fusion ticket with about 720,000 votes against 710,000 for the Republican candidates. The approximate strength of the other parties was: Socialist 22,000; Prohibition 16,000; and Socialist Labor 5,000.

== Sessions ==
The Legislature met for the regular session at the State Capitol in Albany on January 2, 1907; and adjourned on June 26.

James Wolcott Wadsworth Jr. (R) was re-elected Speaker.

On April 3, 1907, the new Senate and Assembly apportionment was declared unconstitutional by the New York Court of Appeals.

The Legislature met for a special session at the State Capitol in Albany on July 8, 1907; and adjourned on July 26. This session was called to enact a new legislative apportionment.

The Legislature re-apportioned the Senate districts, and re-enacted the 1906 Assembly apportionment.

== State Senate ==
=== Districts ===
- 1st District: Nassau and Suffolk counties
- 2nd District: Queens and Richmond counties
- 3rd, 4th, 5th, 6th, 7th, 8th, 9th and 10th District: Parts of Kings County, i.e. the Borough of Brooklyn
- 11th, 12th, 13th, 14th, 15th, 16th, 17th, 18th, 19th, 20th, 21st and 22nd District: Parts of New York County, i.e. the boroughs of Manhattan and the Bronx
- 23rd District: Westchester County
- 24th District: Orange and Rockland counties
- 25th District: Columbia, Dutchess and Putnam and counties
- 26th District: Greene and Ulster counties
- 27th District: Chenango, Delaware and Sullivan counties
- 28th District: Albany County
- 29th District: Rensselaer County
- 30th District: Clinton, Essex and Washington counties
- 31st District: Saratoga and Schenectady counties
- 32nd District: Fulton, Hamilton, Montgomery and Warren counties
- 33rd District: Herkimer, Otsego and Schoharie counties
- 34th District: Franklin and St. Lawrence counties
- 35th District: Jefferson and Lewis counties
- 36th District: Oneida County
- 37th District: Oswego and Madison counties
- 38th District: Onondaga County
- 39th District: Broome, Cortland and Tioga counties
- 40th District: Chemung, Schuyler and Tompkins counties
- 41st District: Cayuga, Seneca and Yates counties
- 42nd District: Ontario and Wayne counties
- 43rd District: Steuben and Allegany counties
- 44th District: Genesee, Livingston and Wyoming counties
- 45th and 46th District: Monroe County
- 47th District: Niagara and Orleans counties
- 48th, 49th and 50th District: Erie County
- 51st District: Cattaraugus and Chautauqua counties

=== Members ===
The asterisk (*) denotes members of the previous Legislature who continued in office as members of this Legislature. Dennis J. Harte, Otto G. Foelker, James A. Thompson, George B. Agnew, John P. Cohalan, William J. Grattan, H. Wallace Knapp, William W. Wemple, S. Percy Hooker changed from the Assembly to the Senate.

| District | Senator | Party | Notes |
|---|---|---|---|
| 1st | Carll S. Burr Jr.* | Republican | re-elected |
| 2nd | Dennis J. Harte* | Democrat | |
| 3rd | Thomas H. Cullen* | Democrat | re-elected |
| 4th | Otto G. Foelker* | Republican | |
| 5th | James A. Thompson* | Democrat | |
| 6th | Eugene M. Travis | Republican | |
| 7th | Patrick H. McCarren* | Democrat | re-elected |
| 8th | Charles H. Fuller | Dem./Ind. L. | |
| 9th | Conrad Hasenflug* | Democrat | re-elected |
| 10th | Alfred J. Gilchrist | Republican | |
| 11th | Dominick F. Mullaney | Dem./Ind. L. | |
| 12th | William Sohmer | Dem./Ind. L. | |
| 13th | Christopher D. Sullivan | Dem./Ind. L. | |
| 14th | Thomas F. Grady* | Dem./Ind. L. | re-elected; Minority Leader |
| 15th | Thomas J. McManus | Dem./Ind. L. | |
| 16th | John T. McCall | Dem./Ind. L. | |
| 17th | George B. Agnew* | Republican | |
| 18th | Martin Saxe* | Republican | re-elected |
| 19th | Alfred R. Page* | Republican | re-elected |
| 20th | James J. Frawley* | Dem./Ind. L. | re-elected |
| 21st | James Owens | Democrat | |
| 22nd | John P. Cohalan* | Dem./Ind. L. | |
| 23rd | Francis M. Carpenter* | Republican | re-elected |
| 24th | John C. R. Taylor | Democrat | |
| 25th | Sanford W. Smith* | Republican | re-elected |
| 26th | John N. Cordts* | Republican | re-elected |
| 27th | Jotham P. Allds* | Republican | re-elected |
| 28th | William J. Grattan* | Republican | |
| 29th | Frank M. Boyce | Democrat | |
| 30th | H. Wallace Knapp* | Republican | |
| 31st | William W. Wemple* | Republican | |
| 32nd | James A. Emerson | Republican | |
| 33rd | Seth G. Heacock | Republican | |
| 34th | William T. O'Neil | Republican | |
| 35th | George H. Cobb* | Republican | re-elected |
| 36th | Joseph Ackroyd | Democrat | |
| 37th | Francis H. Gates* | Ind. R./D./I. L./P. | re-elected |
| 38th | Horace White* | Republican | re-elected |
| 39th | Harvey D. Hinman* | Republican | re-elected |
| 40th | Owen Cassidy* | Republican | re-elected |
| 41st | Benjamin M. Wilcox* | Republican | re-elected |
| 42nd | John Raines* | Republican | re-elected; re-elected President pro tempore |
| 43rd | William J. Tully* | Republican | re-elected |
| 44th | S. Percy Hooker* | Republican | |
| 45th | Thomas B. Dunn | Republican | |
| 46th | William W. Armstrong* | Republican | re-elected |
| 47th | Stanislaus P. Franchot | Republican | |
| 48th | Henry W. Hill* | Republican | re-elected |
| 49th | Samuel J. Ramsperger | Democrat | |
| 50th | George Allen Davis* | Republican | re-elected |
| 51st | Albert T. Fancher* | Republican | re-elected |

=== Employees ===
- Clerk: Lafayette B. Gleason
- Sergeant-at-Arms: Charles R. Hotaling
- Assistant Sergeant-at-Arms: Everett Brown
- Principal Doorkeeper: Christopher Warren
- First Assistant Doorkeeper: Fred S. Maine
- Stenographer: James C. Marriott

== State Assembly ==
=== Assemblymen ===
| District | | Assemblymen | Party | Notes |
|---|---|---|---|---|
| Albany | 1st | Charles W. Mead* | Republican | |
| Albany | 2nd | Thomas F. Maher* | Republican | |
| Albany | 3rd | Robert B. Waters | Republican | |
| Allegany | | Jesse S. Phillips* | Republican | |
| Broome | | James T. Rogers* | Republican | |
| Cattaraugus | | John J. Volk* | Republican | |
| Cayuga | | Frederick A. Dudley | Republican | |
| Chautauqua | 1st | Augustus F. Allen | Republican | |
| Chautauqua | 2nd | Charles Mann Hamilton | Republican | |
| Chemung | | Sherman Moreland* | Republican | unsuccessfully contested by John Deneen (D); Majority Leader |
| Chenango | | Hubert C. Stratton | Democrat | |
| Clinton | | Alonson T. Dominy | Republican | |
| Columbia | | John B. Sinclair | Republican | |
| Cortland | | Charles O. Newton | Republican | |
| Delaware | | James R. Stevenson | Democrat | |
| Dutchess | 1st | Myron Smith* | Republican | |
| Dutchess | 2nd | Frederick Northrup | Democrat | |
| Erie | 1st | Orson J. Weimert | Republican | |
| Erie | 2nd | John Lord O'Brian | Republican | |
| Erie | 3rd | Charles F. Brooks | Republican | |
| Erie | 4th | Edward D. Jackson | Democrat | |
| Erie | 5th | John H. Mallon | Democrat | |
| Erie | 6th | Frank S. Burzynski* | Democrat | |
| Erie | 7th | George W. Walters | Democrat | |
| Erie | 8th | John K. Patton* | Republican | |
| Erie | 9th | Luther J. Shuttleworth* | Republican | |
| Essex | | Frank C. Hooper* | Republican | |
| Franklin | | Charles R. Matthews* | Republican | |
| Fulton and Hamilton | | William Ellison Mills* | Republican | |
| Genesee | | Fred B. Parker | Republican | |
| Greene | | William C. Brady* | Republican | |
| Herkimer | | Thomas D. Ferguson | Republican | |
| Jefferson | 1st | Alfred D. Lowe | Republican | |
| Jefferson | 2nd | Gary H. Wood* | Republican | |
| Kings | 1st | D. Harry Ralston | Republican | resigned his seat on July 26 |
| Kings | 2nd | James Jacobs | Democrat | |
| Kings | 3rd | Michael H. Baumann | Democrat | |
| Kings | 4th | George W. Brown | Republican | |
| Kings | 5th | Charles J. Weber* | Republican | |
| Kings | 6th | Thomas J. Surpless* | Republican | |
| Kings | 7th | Thomas J. Geoghegan | Democrat | |
| Kings | 8th | Thomas J. Farrell | Democrat | |
| Kings | 9th | George A. Voss | Republican | unsuccessfully contested by William Keegan (D) |
| Kings | 10th | Charles F. Murphy* | Republican | |
| Kings | 11th | William W. Colne* | Republican | |
| Kings | 12th | George A. Green* | Republican | |
| Kings | 13th | John H. Donnelly | Democrat | |
| Kings | 14th | William J. Donohue | Democrat | committed suicide on January 31, 1907 |
| Kings | 15th | Daniel J. Collins | Independence L. | |
| Kings | 16th | Charles A. Conrady | Republican | |
| Kings | 17th | Edward C. Dowling* | Republican | |
| Kings | 18th | Warren I. Lee* | Republican | |
| Kings | 19th | Charles Feth* | Ind. L./Dem. | |
| Kings | 20th | Harrison C. Glore | Republican | |
| Kings | 21st | Samuel A. Gluck | Democrat | |
| Kings | 22nd | Edward Eichhorn | Republican | |
| Kings | 23rd | William L. Mooney | Dem./Ind. L. | |
| Lewis | | C. Fred Boshart* | Republican | |
| Livingston | | James Wolcott Wadsworth Jr.* | Republican | re-elected Speaker |
| Madison | | Orlando W. Burhyte | Republican | |
| Monroe | 1st | George F. Harris | Republican | |
| Monroe | 2nd | James L. Whitley* | Republican | |
| Monroe | 3rd | Henry R. Glynn | Dem./Ind. L. | |
| Monroe | 4th | Robert Averill* | Republican | |
| Monroe | 5th | Henry Morgan | Republican | |
| Montgomery | | T. Romeyn Staley | Republican | |
| Nassau | | William G. Miller* | Republican | |
| New York | 1st | James F. Cavanaugh | Democrat | |
| New York | 2nd | Al Smith* | Democrat | |
| New York | 3rd | James Oliver* | Dem./Ind. L. | Minority Leader |
| New York | 4th | William H. Burns* | Dem./Ind. L. | |
| New York | 5th | John T. Eagleton* | Democrat | |
| New York | 6th | Adolph Stern | Dem./Ind. L. | |
| New York | 7th | Joseph W. Keller | Dem./Ind. L. | |
| New York | 8th | Abraham Harawitz* | Dem./Ind. L. | |
| New York | 9th | John C. Hackett* | Dem./Ind. L. | |
| New York | 10th | Cornelius Huth | Dem./Ind. L. | |
| New York | 11th | Owen W. Bohan* | Dem./Ind. L. | |
| New York | 12th | James A. Foley | Dem./Ind. L. | |
| New York | 13th | James J. Hoey | Dem./Ind. L. | |
| New York | 14th | John Loos | Dem./Ind. L. | |
| New York | 15th | Mervin C. Stanley* | Republican | died on February 1, 1907 |
| New York | 16th | Martin G. McCue | Democrat | |
| New York | 17th | William Young* | Republican | |
| New York | 18th | Mark Goldberg | Democrat | |
| New York | 19th | Alexander Brough | Republican | |
| New York | 20th | George Schwegler* | Dem./Ind. L. | |
| New York | 21st | Robert S. Conklin | Republican | |
| New York | 22nd | Robert F. Wagner | Dem./Ind. L. | |
| New York | 23rd | James A. Francis* | Republican | |
| New York | 24th | James V. Ganly | Dem./Ind. L. | |
| New York | 25th | Ezra P. Prentice* | Republican | |
| New York | 26th | Leopold Prince | Dem./Ind. L. | |
| New York | 27th | Beverley R. Robinson | Republican | |
| New York | 28th | Edward W. Buckley | Dem./Ind. L. | |
| New York | 29th | Frederick D. Wells* | Republican | |
| New York | 30th | Louis A. Cuvillier | Democrat | |
| New York | 31st | Philip Reece | Republican | |
| New York | 32nd | Willoughby B. Dobbs | Dem./Ind. L. | |
| New York | 33rd | Philip J. Schmidt | Dem./Ind. L. | |
| New York | 34th | George M. S. Schulz | Dem./Ind. L. | |
| New York | 35th | John V. Sheridan | Dem./Ind. L. | |
| Niagara | 1st | Charles F. Foley | Democrat | |
| Niagara | 2nd | W. Levell Draper* | Republican | |
| Oneida | 1st | Merwin K. Hart | Republican | |
| Oneida | 2nd | Ladd J. Lewis Jr. | Republican | |
| Oneida | 3rd | Arthur G. Blue | Republican | |
| Onondaga | 1st | Edward Schoeneck* | Republican | |
| Onondaga | 2nd | Fred W. Hammond* | Republican | |
| Onondaga | 3rd | George L. Baldwin | Republican | |
| Ontario | | Jean L. Burnett* | Republican | died on February 26, 1907 |
| Orange | 1st | William G. Hastings* | Republican | |
| Orange | 2nd | Charles E. Mance | Republican | |
| Orleans | | Myron E. Eggleston | Republican | |
| Oswego | | Fred G. Whitney* | Republican | |
| Otsego | | Charles Smith | Republican | |
| Putnam | | John R. Yale* | Republican | |
| Queens | 1st | Thomas H. Todd | Democrat | |
| Queens | 2nd | Joseph Flanagan | Democrat | |
| Queens | 3rd | Conrad Garbe | Democrat | |
| Queens | 4th | William A. De Groot* | Republican | |
| Rensselaer | 1st | Frederick C. Filley* | Republican | |
| Rensselaer | 2nd | Bradford R. Lansing* | Republican | |
| Richmond | | William T. Croak | Democrat | |
| Rockland | | Matthew Hurd | Republican | |
| St. Lawrence | 1st | Fred J. Gray* | Republican | |
| St. Lawrence | 2nd | Edwin A. Merritt Jr.* | Republican | |
| Saratoga | | George H. Whitney* | Republican | |
| Schenectady | | Miles R. Frisbie | Republican | |
| Schoharie | | Charles H. Holmes | Democrat | |
| Schuyler | | Charles A. Cole | Republican | |
| Seneca | | William B. Harper | Democrat | |
| Steuben | 1st | William H. Chamberlain* | Republican | |
| Steuben | 2nd | Charles K. Marlatt | Republican | |
| Suffolk | 1st | John M. Lupton* | Republican | |
| Suffolk | 2nd | Orlando Hubbs* | Republican | |
| Sullivan | | George W. Murphy | Republican | |
| Tioga | | Byram L. Winters* | Republican | |
| Tompkins | | William R. Gunderman* | Republican | |
| Ulster | 1st | Joseph M. Fowler* | Republican | |
| Ulster | 2nd | William D. Cunningham* | Republican | |
| Warren | | William R. Waddell* | Republican | |
| Washington | | Eugene R. Norton* | Republican | |
| Wayne | | Edson W. Hamn* | Republican | |
| Westchester | 1st | Harry W. Haines | Republican | |
| Westchester | 2nd | Holland S. Duell | Republican | |
| Westchester | 3rd | James K. Apgar* | Republican | |
| Westchester | 4th | J. Mayhew Wainwright* | Republican | |
| Wyoming | | Byron A. Nevins* | Republican | |
| Yates | | Leonidas D. West* | Republican | |

=== Employees ===
- Clerk: Archie E. Baxter
- Assistant Clerk: Ray B. Smith
- Sergeant-at-Arms:
- Stenographer:

== Sources ==
- Official New York from Cleveland to Hughes by Charles Elliott Fitch (Hurd Publishing Co., New York and Buffalo, 1911, Vol. IV; see pg. 353f for assemblymen; and 366 for senators)
- Journal of the Senate (130th Session) (1907, Vol. I)
- STATE LEGISLATURE STILL REPUBLICAN in NYT on November 7, 1906
- JIMMY OLIVER LEADER OF ASSEMBLY MINORITY in NYT on January 2, 1907
- MURPHY'S WAR ON MAYOR IS STARTED AT ALBANY in NYT on January 3, 1907
