= George H. Whitney =

American politician

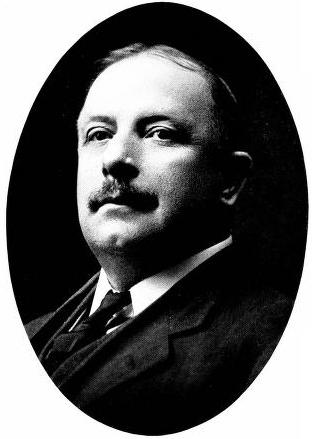
- Photograph of Whitney, 1916

Member of the New York State Senate
- In office 1913–1918
- Preceded by: Edgar T. Brackett
- Succeeded by: Henry M. Sage

Member of the New York State Assembly for Saratoga County
- In office 1912–1912
- Preceded by: William M. Martin
- Succeeded by: Gilbert T. Seelye
- In office 1903–1910
- Preceded by: William K. Mansfield
- Succeeded by: William M. Martin

Personal details
- Born: George Herbert Whitney; August 19, 1863 Stockbridge, Massachusetts, U.S.
- Died: April 22, 1928 (aged 64) Mechanicville, New York, U.S.
- Parent: George Fenn Whitney

George Herbert Whitney (August 19, 1863 – April 22, 1928) was an American pharmacist and politician from New York.

== Life ==
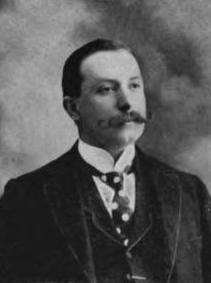
George H. Whitney (1903)

Whitney was born on August 19, 1863, in Stockbridge, Massachusetts, and was the son of George Fenn Whitney.

He attended the public schools in Stockbridge, and then began to work as a drugstore clerk, first in Castleton-on-Hudson, New York, then in Hudson, New York, and then in New Haven, Connecticut.

== Career ==
In 1884, he passed the New York State pharmacy exam, the next year began managing his brother-in-law's drugstore in Mechanicville, and succeeded to the business in 1887. He was treasurer of Mechanicville for two terms; and supervisor of Halfmoon for several terms beginning in 1898.

Whitney was a member of the New York State Assembly (Saratoga Co.) in 1903, 1904, 1905, 1906, 1907, 1908, 1909, 1910 and 1912; and was Chairman of the Committee on Public Health in 1908, on Internal Affairs in 1909 and 1910, and on Ways and Means in 1912.

He was a member of the New York State Senate (30th D.) from 1913 to 1918, sitting in the 136th, 137th, 138th, 139th, 140th and 141st New York State Legislatures. He was a member of the New York State Commission for the Panama–Pacific International Exposition in 1915.

== Personal life ==
In 1888, Whitney was married to Martha McGiffert (1865–1950).

Whitney died of a heart attack on April 22, 1928, in Mechanicville, Saratoga County, New York.

== Sources ==
New York State Assembly
Preceded by William K. Mansfield	New York State Assembly; Saratoga County; 1903–1910	Succeeded by William M. Martin
Preceded by William M. Martin	New York State Assembly; Saratoga County; 1912	Succeeded by Gilbert T. Seelye
New York State Senate
Preceded by Edgar T. Brackett	New York State Senate; 30th District; 1913–1918	Succeeded by Henry M. Sage
