= William J. Grattan =

American politician (1876–1938)

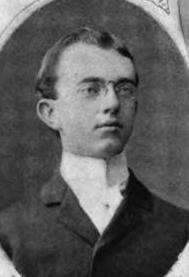
- Grattan, 1903

New York State Senate
- In office 1907–1910

New York State Assembly
- In office 1903–1906

Personal details
- Born: May 20, 1876 Watervliet, New York, US
- Died: December 6, 1938 (aged 62) Cohoes, New York, US
- Education: Albany Business College; Albany Law School
- Occupation: Lawyer

William J. Grattan (May 20, 1876 – December 6, 1938) was an American lawyer and politician from New York. He served in the New York State Senate and New York State Assembly.

== Early life ==
Grattan was born on May 20, 1876 in Watervliet, Albany County, New York, then called West Troy. His family moved to Cohoes, New York in 1887. He attended St. Augustine's Academy in Lansingburgh, New York. Gratton served as an assembly page for the New York State Assembly in 1892 and 1893. He graduated from St. Bernard's Academy in Cohoes in 1894.

Grattan to the Albany Business College, receiving diplomas from the shorthand and commercial departments. He then worked as a stenographer and manager clerk for lawyer and senator Myer Nussbaum. He was an assistant librarian of the New York State Assembly in 1894 and assistant postmaster of the Assembly in 1895. From 1896 to 1898, he was Nussbaum's private secretary. He was the private secretary of Congressman George N Southwick in 1898.

After studying law privately for two years, Gratton enrolled in the Union University Law Department (now Albany Law School). He graduated with an LL.B. in 1898.

== Career ==
Gratton was admitted to the bar in September 1898 and practiced law in Albany, New York. He was affiliate with the firm Nussbaum & Coughlin. He was authorized to practice before the New York Supreme Court and the U.S. civil and criminal courts. He was a member of the Albany County Bar Association and the New York State Bar Association.

He was elected to the New York State Assembly in 1902, representing the 4th district of Albany County. He was a Republican. Grattan was a member of the New York State Assembly in 1903, 1904, 1905 and 1906. In 1903, he served on the Affairs of Cities Committee, the Labor and Industries Committee, and the Revision Committee.

When the 4th district was abolished in redistricting, he successfully ran for the New York State Senate in 1906 and 1908. He was a member of the New York State Senate (28th District.) from 1907 to 1910, sitting in the 130th, 131st, 132nd and 133rd New York State Legislatures. While in the Senate, he voted against the Hughes anti-gambling bills.

Later, he was Clerk of Albany County for two terms. He was a Republican.

== Personal life ==
Grafton belonged to the Benevolent and Protective Order of Elks, the Catholic Union, the Haymakers of Albany, the Holy Name Society, Independent Order of Foresters, Knights of Columbus, and the Society of the Holy Name. He was a founding member of the Ga-ha-oose Tribe no. 42 of the Improved Order of Red Men, serving as its president. He was a member of Albany Law School Alumni Association, St. Bernards Alumni Association, and Union University Alumni Association. He was a member of the Catholic Church.

Grafton died in Cohoes, New York, on December 6, 1938, after a heart attack, at the age of 61 years.

New York State Assembly
Preceded by Thomas G. Ross	New York State Assembly; Albany County, 4th District; 1903–1906	Succeeded by district abolished
New York State Senate
Preceded by Edgar T. Brackett	New York State Senate; 28th District; 1907–1910	Succeeded by Henry M. Sage
