= Nathaniel A. Elsberg =

American politician

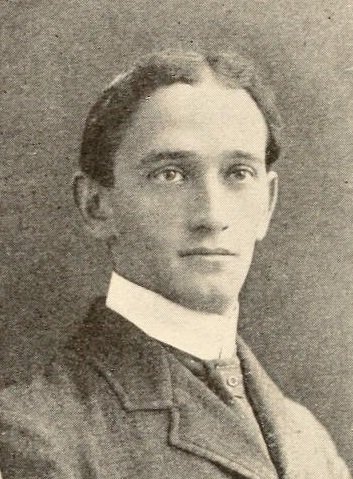
Nathaniel A. Elsberg (1902)

Nathaniel A. Elsberg (January 1872 – June 4, 1932) was an American lawyer and politician from New York.

== Life ==
He was born in 1872 in New York City. He graduated from City College of New York in 1891. Then he became a newspaper writer, and was associate editor of the American Economist. At the same time he studied law, graduated from New York University School of Law in 1893, and practiced in New York City.

Elsberg was a member of the New York State Senate (15th D.) from 1899 to 1906, sitting in the 122nd, 123rd, 124th, 125th, 126th, 127th, 128th and 129th New York State Legislatures.

Elsberg became an advocate for school integration. He introduced state legislature by 1900 to integrate the school system. Thomas F. Grady, a Democrat, strongly protested the Elsberg bill. Grady accused Elsberg and his Republican party of playing racial politics. African-American New Yorkers were dissatisfied with the Republican party. Mayor William Lafayette Strong was partly to blame for racial dissatisfication within the G.O.P., as he broke many promises to the black race.

He died on June 4, 1932, at his home at 112 Central Park South in Manhattan, of pneumonia after a long illness. His brother Dr. Charles A. Elsberg (1871-1948) was a pioneer of spinal surgery working with Columbia Presbyterian Medical Center in upper Manhattan. He was also the brother of Herman A. Elsberg, an American textile designer and collector for institutions such as the Museum of Fine Arts in Boston, MA. His sister, Bertha Elsberg Oppenheim was also a published writer and poet.

== Sources ==
New York State Senate
Preceded by Frank D. Pavey	New York State Senate; 15th District; 1899–1906	Succeeded by Thomas J. McManus
