= Daniel J. Collins =

American politician

Daniel James Collins (died May 5, 1926) was an American politician from New York.

== Life ==
He was born in New York City. He attended the public schools. Then he became a printer.

Collins was elected as a member of the Independence League to the New York State Assembly (Kings Co., 15th D.), and sat in the 130th New York State Legislature in 1907.

He died on May 5, 1926, at his home at 1488 Bushwick Ave. in Brooklyn.

New York State Assembly
Preceded by Charles C. G. Sprenger	New York State Assembly; Kings County, 15th District; 1907	Succeeded by John J. Schutta
