= Daniel J. Riordan =

American politician (1870–1923)

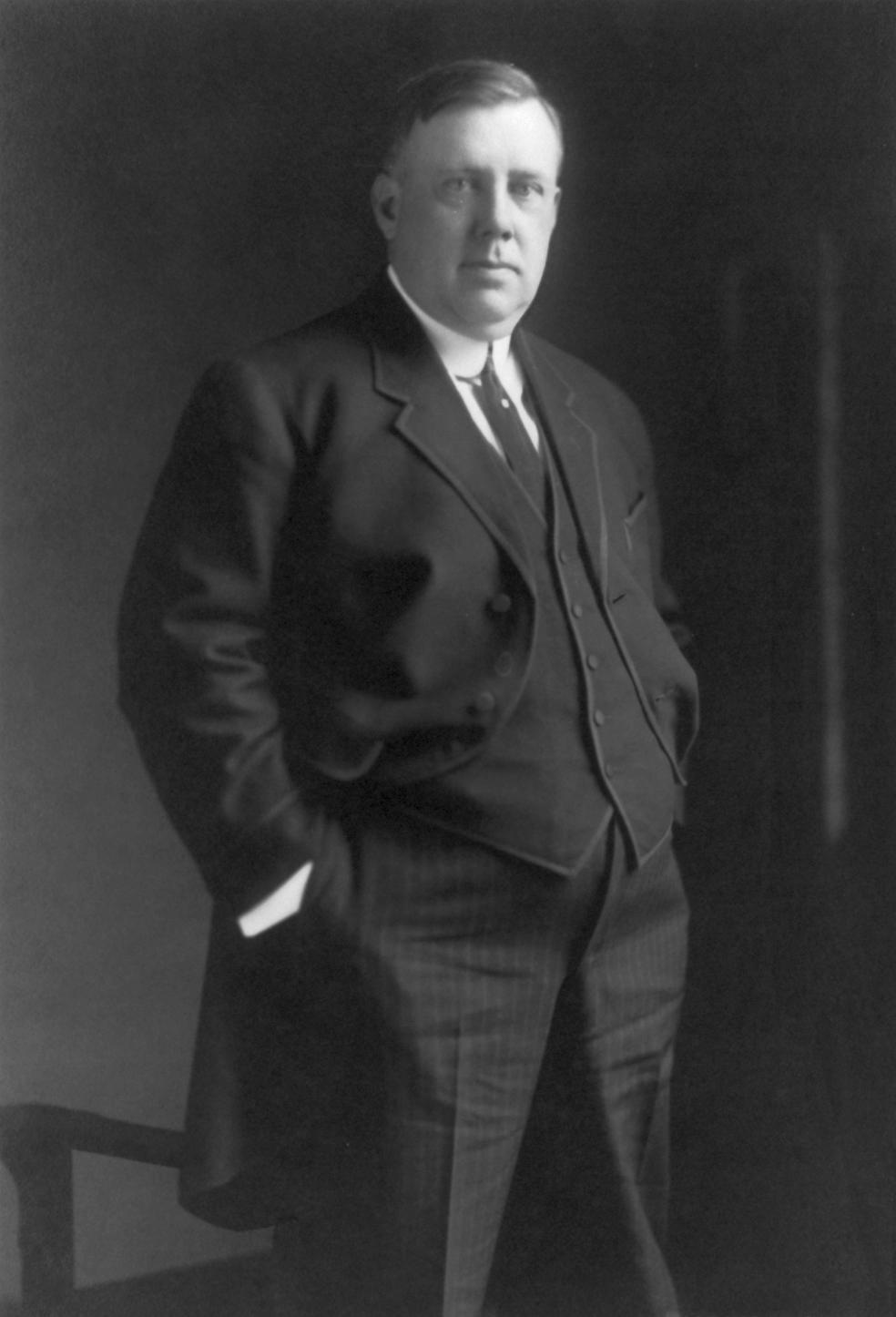
Riordan, c. 1912

Daniel Joseph Riordan (July 7, 1870 – April 28, 1923) was a U.S. representative from New York for one term from 1899 to 1901 and for eight additional terms from 1906 to 1923.

He was a Democrat and a member of Tammany Hall.

== Biography ==
Riordan was born in New York City and attended public schools until 1886, when he entered Manhattan College, from which he graduated in 1890. He engaged in the real-estate business.

=== Political career ===
Riordan was elected as a Democrat to the 56th United States Congress, holding office from March 4, 1899, to March 3, 1901. He was a member of the New York State Senate (10th D.) from 1903 to 1906, sitting in the 126th, 127th, 128th and 129th New York State Legislatures.

Riordan was elected to the 59th United States Congress to fill the vacancy caused by the resignation of Timothy D. Sullivan and on the same day was elected to the 60th United States Congress. He was re-elected to the 61st and to the seven succeeding Congresses, holding office from November 6, 1906, until his death in Washington, D.C., on April 28, 1923.

=== Burial ===
He was buried at the Calvary Cemetery in Queens.

== See also ==
- List of members of the United States Congress who died in office (1900–1949)

U.S. House of Representatives
Preceded by John M. Mitchell	Member of the U.S. House of Representatives from New York's 8th congressional district 1899–1901	Succeeded by Thomas J. Creamer
New York State Senate
Preceded by John F. Ahearn	New York State Senate; 10th District; 1903–1906	Succeeded by Alfred J. Gilchrist
U.S. House of Representatives
Preceded by Timothy Sullivan	Member of the U.S. House of Representatives from New York's 8th congressional district 1906–1913	Succeeded by Daniel J. Griffin
Preceded by Charles V. Fornes	Member of the U.S. House of Representatives from New York's 11th congressional district 1913–1923	Succeeded by Anning Smith Prall
