= James J. Frawley =

American politician

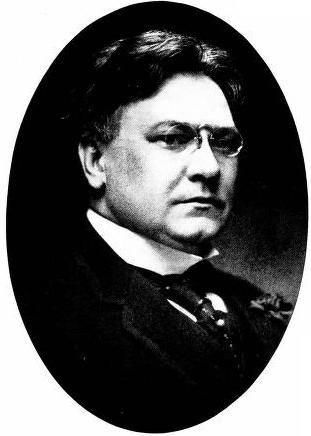
- Frawley in 1916
- Born: 1867
- Died: September 1, 1926 (aged 58–59)
- Occupation: politician from New York

James J. Frawley (1867 – September 1, 1926) was an American politician from New York.

== Life ==
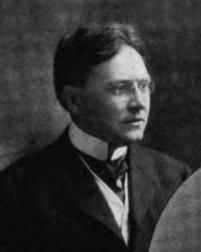
James J. Frawley (1903)

Frawley was a member of the New York State Senate (20th D.) from 1903 to 1914, sitting in the 126th, 127th, 128th, 129th, 130th, 131st, 132nd, 133rd, 134th, 135th, 136th and 137th New York State Legislatures.

Frawley was a member of the New York State Commission for the Panama–Pacific International Exposition in 1915.

He was a member of Tammany Hall.

Frawley reportedly coined the term "The Sturgeon King" to refer to Barney Greengrass.

== Death ==
He died on September 1, 1926, while on vacation in Dixville Notch, New Hampshire, after a heart attack.

New York State Senate
Preceded by Thomas F. Donnelly	New York State Senate; 20th District; 1903–1914	Succeeded by Irving I. Joseph
