= H. Wallace Knapp =

American politician

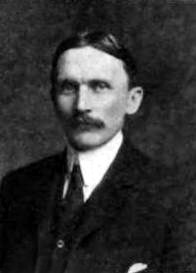
H. Wallace Knapp (1903)

Horatio Wallace Knapp (March 31, 1869 – April 4, 1929) was an American politician who represented Clinton County in the New York State Assembly over the course of 1903, 1904, 1905 and 1906; and in the New York State Senate during 1907 and 1908.

== Life ==
Knapp was born in Mooers, New York. He was a merchant in Mooers, and later also engaged in banking, and electric power supply.

Knapp was Supervisor of the Town of Mooers for several terms beginning in 1899, and Chairman of the Board of Supervisors of Clinton County in 1901 and 1902.

He died, in St. Petersburg, Florida.

== Sources ==
- Official New York from Cleveland to Hughes by Charles Elliott Fitch (Hurd Publishing Co., New York and Buffalo, 1911, Vol. IV; pg. 346, 348, 350f and 366)
- The New York Red Book by Edgar L. Murlin (1903; pg. 146)

New York State Assembly
Preceded by John F. O'Brien	New York State Assembly; Clinton County; 1903–1906	Succeeded by Alonson T. Dominy
New York State Senate
Preceded by William D. Barnes	New York State Senate; 30th District; 1907–1908	Succeeded by Edgar T. Brackett
