= George W. Dunn =

American politician

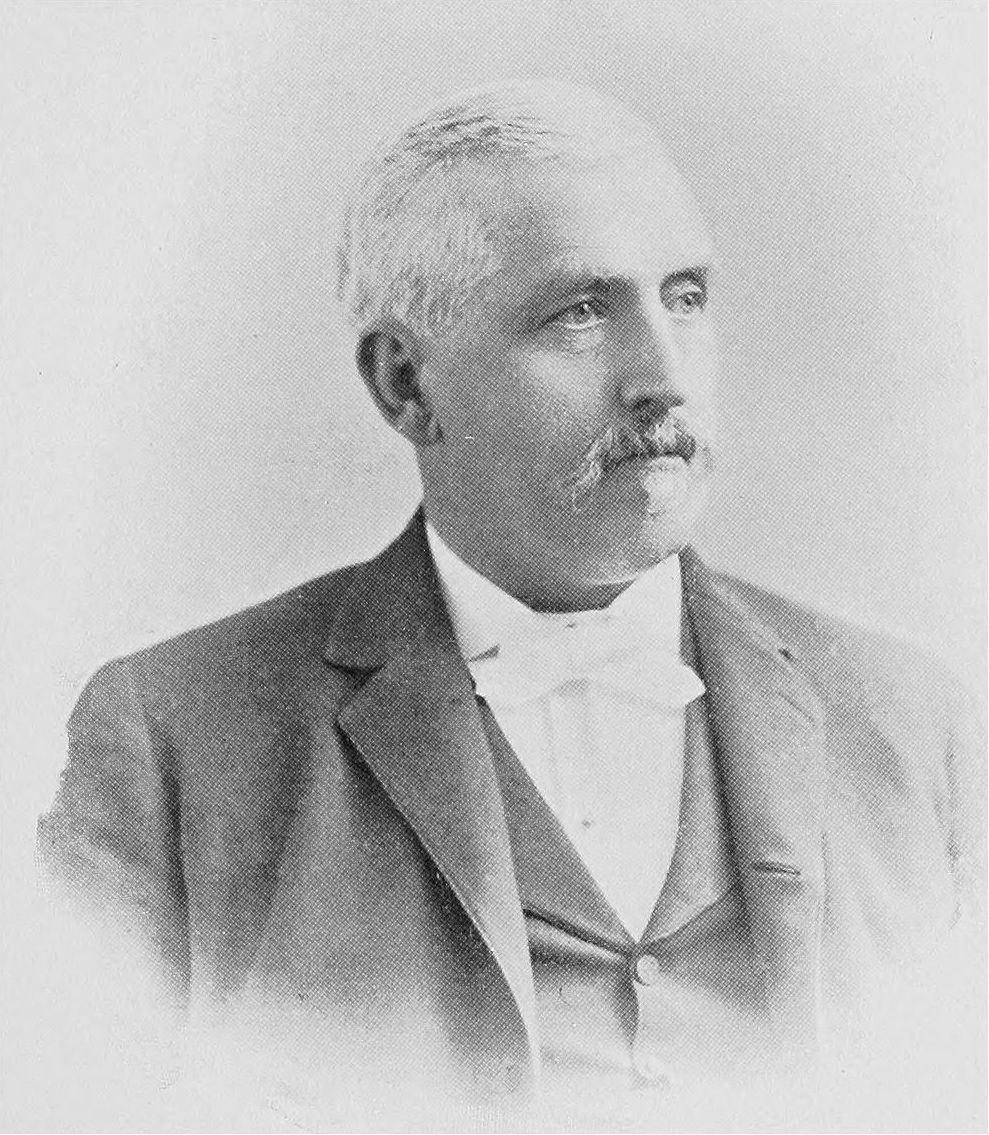
George W. Dunn

George W. Dunn (November 27, 1840 – November 27, 1914) was an American politician from New York.

== Life ==
Dunn was born in Chenango, New York on November 27, 1840. He was the son of John Dunn and Isabella Black. He attended Susquehanna Seminary and a business college, and was about to begin business life when the American Civil War broke out.

In May 1861, Dunn enlisted in the 27th New York Volunteer Infantry Regiment and was mustered in as sergeant of Company C. He was captured by the Confederacy in the First Battle of Bull Run. He was paroled in May 1862. In August, he reenlisted in the 109th New York Volunteer Infantry Regiment and was mustered in as captain of Company D. He was wounded in the Battle of Spotsylvania Court House in May 1864. After the battle, he was promoted to major. In the Battle of the Crater, with Colonel Catlin and Major Stillson injured, Dunn took command of the Regiment. For his service, he was promoted to colonel, and for the rest of his life he was popularly known as Colonel Dunn. He was honorably discharged in May 1865.

After the War, he engaged in business in Elmira. Within a year, he left to join a mining expedition in Honduras. In the fall of 1866, when the tropical climate became bad for his health, he left. In 1868, he was appointed superintendent of public documents published by Congress in Washington D.C., a position he held until 1875.

In 1875, Dunn moved to Binghamton and was elected Sheriff of Broome County. When his term expired, he was involved in the consolidation of the local daily newspapers, the Binghamton Republican and Binghamton Times, and was chosen as the new paper's treasurer and business manager. From 1881 to 1886 he served as the city's postmaster. Afterwards, he worked in real estate and manufacturing. At different points he was president of the Binghamton General Electric Company, vice-president of the Bundy Manufacturing Company, director of the Susquehanna Valley Bank, trustee of the Chenango Valley Savings Bank, director and vice-president of the Strong State Bank, director of the Binghamton, Lestershire, and Union Railroad Company, and director of the Binghamton Wagon Company. He also served as manager of the Equitable Accident Association, president of the board of trustees of the Binghamton State Hospital, and member of the city excise and police commission.

In 1889, he was again appointed postmaster of Binghamton. He served as Clerk of the New York State Assembly in 1894. He was appointed to the New York State Board of Railroad Commissioners in 1897, and in 1900 was appointed trustee for the New York State Soldiers and Sailors' Home in Bath.

Dunn served in the New York Republican State Committee since 1886. In 1900, he was elected chairman of the committee. He held the position until 1904. He was a delegate to the 1904 and 1908 Republican National Conventions.

Dunn was a member of the Grand Army of the Republic. In 1870, he married Sarah M. Thomas of Chenango. They had one daughter, Mabel E.

Dunn died at home on November 27, 1914, on his 74th birthday. He was buried in the family mausoleum in Floral Park Cemetery.

Party political offices
Preceded by Benjamin B. Odell Jr.	Chairman of the New York Republican State Committee; November 1900 – April 1904	Succeeded by Benjamin B. Odell Jr.
Government offices
Preceded by Charles R. DeFreest	Clerk of the New York State Assembly; 1894	Succeeded by Archie E. Baxter
