= Jesse Johnson (New York lawyer) =

American lawyer and judge

Jesse Johnson (February 20, 1842 – October 31, 1918) was an American lawyer and judge from New York.

== Life ==
Johnson was born on February 20, 1842, in Bradford, Vermont, the son of Elliott Payson Johnson and Sarah Taylor. The family moved to Orford, New Hampshire, in 1856.

Johnson entered Dartmouth College in 1859. He was a member of the Dartmouth Zouaves, but he didn't enlist or fight in the American Civil War. He graduated from Dartmouth in 1863. He then went to Albany Law School, graduating from there in 1864. He was admitted to the bar later that year. He spent a year working in the law office of John T. Townsend in New York City, after which he moved to Brooklyn and began practicing law there. In 1869, he was appointed Assistant Corporation Counsel of Brooklyn, a position he held for the next eight years. In 1873, he formed the law firm Dewitt & Johnson with the Corporation Counsel. In 1881, he formed a new law firm with Albert C. Lamb known as Johnson & Lamb.

In 1883, Johnson unsuccessfully ran as a Republican for the New York Supreme Court Justice in the 2nd Judicial District. He was a delegate to and vice-president of the 1888 Republican National Convention. In 1889, President Harrison appointed him United States Attorney for the Eastern District of New York. He served that position until 1894. He was a delegate to the 1894 New York Constitutional Convention. In 1897, Governor Black appointed him to the New York Supreme Court to fill a vacancy. His term as Justice expired in 1899. He continued his private law practice until 1900, when a series of strokes made him retire.

Johnson was a vestryman of the Protestant Episcopal Church of the Messiah of Brooklyn. He was a member of the New England Society, the Vermont Society, and the Brooklyn Club. In 1868, he married Sarah E. Russell of Brooklyn. They had one son, Jesse William. Sarah died in 1897, and Johnson then married Mary Adaline Prichard of Worcester, Massachusetts. Jesse was a lawyer and practiced in his father's law firm.

Johnson died in his apartment in Hotel St. George on October 31, 1918. He was buried in his family plot in Green-Wood Cemetery.

Legal offices
Preceded by Mark D. Wilber	U.S. Attorney for the Eastern District of New York; 1889–1894	Succeeded by John Oakey
