= Carolyn Pokorny =

American prosecutor

Acting United States Attorney for the Eastern District of New York
- In office January 11, 2025 – January 22, 2025
- Preceded by: Breon Peace
- Succeeded by: John J. Durham (acting)

Personal details
- Education: New York University (BA); Brooklyn Law School (JD)
- Awards: Attorney General's Award for Distinguished Service (2011), Federal Prosecutor of the Year by the Federal Law Enforcement Foundation (2013)

Carolyn Pokorny is a career federal prosecutor, who serves as the first assistant United States attorney for the Eastern District of New York. In January 2025, she served as acting United States attorney for the Eastern District of New York. Previously she served as the Inspector general for the New York City Metropolitan Transportation Authority at the Office of the MTA Inspector General, becoming the first woman to hold that position.

== Education ==
Pokorny graduated from Brooklyn Law School where she was the associate managing editor of Law Review, and received her bachelor's degree cum laude from New York University. From 2002 to 2014, Pokorny served as an adjunct associate professor of clinical law at Brooklyn Law School.

== Career ==
After graduating from Brooklyn Law School, Pokorny joined the Bronx District Attorney's Office as an Assistant District Attorney, where she spent three years serving in the Appeals Bureau.

For two years, Pokorny served as a judicial law clerk to Judge Arthur Spatt of the United States District Court for the Eastern District of New York.

From 1999 to 2014, Pokorny served as a federal prosecutor in the United States Attorney for the Eastern District of New York. Pokorny led the Office's narcotics and money laundering program and created the Office's International Narcotics and Money Laundering Strike Force, widely regarded as a "jewel" of the United States Department of Justice. Pokorny went on to become the Eastern District of New York's Senior Litigation Counsel for Public Integrity, focusing on public corruption and white collar prosecutions. In 2011, then-Brooklyn US Attorney Loretta Lynch asked Pokorny to be her Deputy Chief of the Criminal Division, overseeing 100 criminal Assistant US attorneys in all areas, including fraud and corruption.

She received several awards for her work, including the U.S. Attorney General's Award for Distinguished Service, and the Federal Prosecutor of the Year award from the Federal Law Enforcement Foundation.

In 2022, Pokorny returned to the U.S. Attorney's Office to serve as the first assistant United States attorney to Breon Peace.

=== Courtroom attack ===
On March 11, 2008, Pokorny was attacked in court in Brooklyn by Victor Wright with a razor he sneaked into the courtroom. The court reporter, Ronald Tolkin, "quickly jumped on Mr. Wright as he vigorously choked Ms. Pokorny but failed to cut her." Pokorny had successfully prosecuted Wright on federal drug charges in 2006 as part of a case involving the notorious kingpin Kenneth "Supreme" McGriff.

=== Notable cases ===
==== Norte Valle cartel ====
Pokorny led the international investigation that resulted in the conviction of drug kingpin Juan Carlos "Chupeta" Ramírez Abadía and over 30 leaders of Colombia’s most powerful Cocaine cartel, known as the “Norte Valle cartel,” on charges of murder, operating a continuing criminal enterprise, money laundering and drug trafficking. Pokorny was able to help foreign governments recover nearly $1 billion in drug proceeds.

==== Irv Gotti, Murder Inc., Kenneth "Supreme" McGriff ====
From 2003 to 2005 she was part of the prosecutors who probed the 2003 money laundering case of record label executive Irv Gotti and Kenneth "Supreme" McGriff.

==== Joaquín "El Chapo" Guzmán ====
In 2009, Pokorny helped spearhead a national coordination effort between the United States Department of Justice and several U.S. Attorney's Offices across the United States to bring charges and seek the extradition of the leaders of several Mexican cartels, including Joaquín "El Chapo" Guzmán.

==== Assemblyman Boyland ====
In November 2011 Pokorny oversaw the undercover FBI investigation of New York State Assemblyman William Boyland Jr. and his chief of staff, Ryan Hermon, for bribe taking. Boyland was sentenced to 14 years in federal prison.

==== Trial of Pedro Espada Jr. ====
In March 2012, Pokorny was a member of the trial team that obtained convictions against the former Majority Leader of the New York State Senate Pedro Espada Jr. and his son on theft charges for using the nonprofit Soundview health network for personal purchases. Espada was sentenced to 5 years in federal prison.

==== Sant Singh Chatwell, Dream Hotels ====
Pokorny prosecuted hotel magnate Sant Singh Chatwal of Dream Hotels for evading federal campaign contribution laws.

=== Office of the United States Attorney General ===
In 2015, President Barack Obama tapped Loretta Lynch, Pokorny's former boss, to be United States Attorney General. Pokorny became Lynch's Deputy Chief of Staff and Counselor serving as one of her senior advisors.

=== New York State Special Counsel Program for Ethics, Risk and Compliance ===
In early 2017, Pokorny joined Governor Andrew Cuomo's office heading the State-wide program for Ethics, Risk and Compliance for more than 2 years.

=== Office of the MTA Inspector General ===
In May 2019, after unanimous confirmation by New York State Senate, Pokorny became the first woman to lead the Office of the MTA Inspector General, the watchdog group for the Metropolitan Transportation Authority, the largest public transit authority in the United States. In this role she has been lauded by good government and transit advocacy group for increasing the transparency of the office.

== Acting U.S. attorney ==
After Breon Peace resigned on January 10, 2025, Pokorny became the acting United States attorney for the Eastern District of New York.
