= James L. Bennett =

American lawyer

James Levi Bennett (April 8, 1849 – January 30, 1918) was an American lawyer from New York.

== Life ==
Bennett was born on April 8, 1849, in Durhamville, New York, the son of William H. Bennett and Elizabeth A. Thompson.

Bennett attended Oneida Academy. He graduated from Hamilton College in 1871, and received an LL.B. from there in 1872. He was also admitted to the bar that year. In 1873, he was appointed Assistant District Attorney of Onondaga County. He studied law in the law office of M. J. Shoecraft of Oneida and Irving G. Vann. In 1874, he became a member of the Oneida law firm Shoecraft, Bennett & Tuttle. In 1882, he moved to New York City, followed by Brooklyn shortly afterwards.

An active member of the Democratic Party, Bennett served as chairman of several State conventions. In 1894, President Cleveland appointed him U.S. Attorney for the Eastern District of New York. After he retired from the office, he resumed his law practice. His law office was at 100 Broadway.

In 1885, Bennett married Emma M. Wilson of Frankfort. They had a son, Dwight H. He was a member of the New York County Lawyers' Association, the Union League, and Alpha Delta Phi. He was a Unitarian.

Bennett died of heart trouble on the 181st Street station platform while on his way to see a client in the Bronx on January 30, 1918. He was buried in Glenwood Cemetery in Oneida.

Legal offices
Preceded by John Oakey	U.S. Attorney for the Eastern District of New York; 1894–1898	Succeeded by George H. Pettit
