= Charles R. DeFreest =

New York politician (1852–1901)

Charles Rutger DeFreest (July 24, 1852 – May 10, 1901) was a journalist, newspaper editor, and politician from New York.

== Life ==
DeFreest was born in Troy, New York, on July 24, 1852. Shortly after his birth, his father bought and moved the family to a farm in North Greenbush.

DeFreest attended Troy High School, and in 1870 he began working as a reporter for the Troy Daily Press. He then worked for the Troy Daily Times, where he was later promoted to city editor. He then became the managing editor of the Sunday paper Northern Budget, a position he held until 1892.

In 1875, when Edward Murphy Jr. was elected mayor of Troy, DeFreest was appointed city clerk. He was later appointed deputy controller for the rest of Murphy's term as mayor. He then received a position in the New York State Insurance Department, which he held until 1891. When Murphy became chairman of the New York State Democratic Committee in 1887, DeFreest became clerk of the committee.

In 1891, DeFreest became the Clerk of the New York State Assembly. He served this position in 1891, 1892, and 1893.

DeFreest then served as secretary of the New York State Railroad Commission. He worked with the Union Steel and Chain Company, followed by secretary the International Kaolin Company. He also served as president of the International Silex Company.

DeFreest was a member and vice-president of the Holland Society of New York. His wife was Sarah B. Price. DeFreest later married Elzada Collins of Greenbush, NY by whom he fathered three sons: Charles, Jr., Stanley W., and Roy S. DeFreest, all of whom survived him.

DeFreest died of apoplexy in Bay Ridge, Brooklyn, on May 10, 1901, a month after he moved there. He was buried in the Ballston Spa Village Cemetery.

Government offices
Preceded by Charles A. Chickering	Clerk of the New York State Assembly; 1891-1893	Succeeded by George W. Dunn
