= Benjamin F. Tracy =

American judge and politician (1830–1915)

Benjamin Tracy
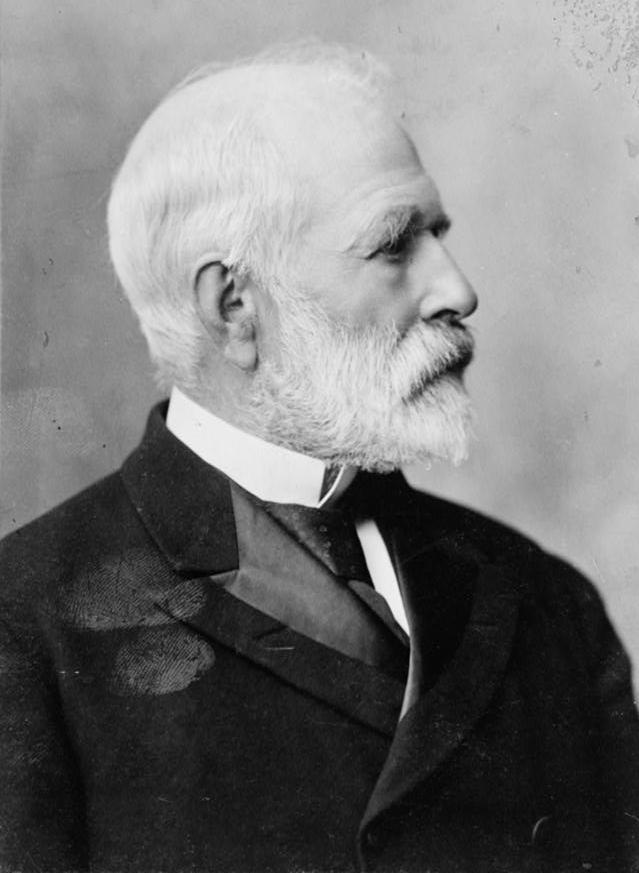
- Tracy, c. 1897

32nd United States Secretary of the Navy
- In office March 6, 1889 – March 4, 1893
- President: Benjamin Harrison
- Preceded by: William Whitney
- Succeeded by: Hilary A. Herbert

Judge of the New York Court of Appeals
- In office December 1881 – December 1882
- Appointed by: Alonzo B. Cornell
- Preceded by: Charles Andrews
- Succeeded by: Charles Andrews

United States Attorney for the Eastern District of New York
- In office 1866–1877
- President: Andrew Johnson; Ulysses S. Grant
- Preceded by: Benjamin D. Silliman
- Succeeded by: Asa W. Tenney

Member of the New York State Assembly from the Tioga County district
- In office January 1, 1862 – December 31, 1862
- Preceded by: Cero Barber
- Succeeded by: Nathaniel Davis

Personal details
- Born: Benjamin Franklin Tracy; April 26, 1830 Apalachin, New York, U.S.
- Died: August 6, 1915 (aged 85) New York City, New York, U.S.
- Party: Republican

Military service
- Allegiance: United States • Union
- Branch/service: United States Army • Union Army
- Years of service: 1862–1865
- Rank: Colonel; Brevet Brigadier General
- Commands: 109th New York Infantry Regiment
- Battles/wars: American Civil War • Battle of the Wilderness
- Awards: Medal of Honor

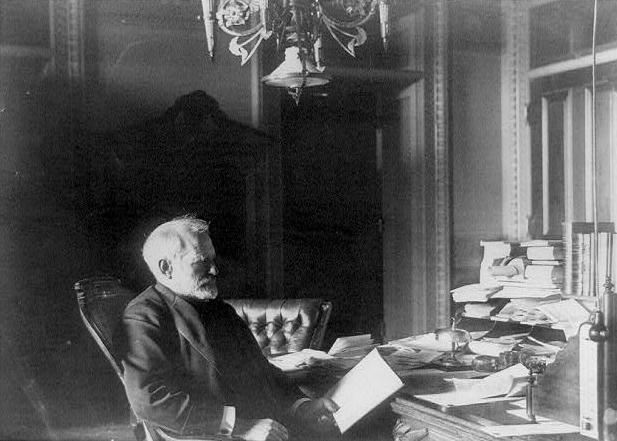
Tracy in his office (c. 1890)

Benjamin Franklin Tracy (April 26, 1830 – August 6, 1915) was a United States political figure who served as Secretary of the Navy from 1889 through 1893, during the administration of U.S. President Benjamin Harrison.

== Biography ==
He was born in the hamlet of Apalachin located in the Town of Owego, New York, on April 26, 1830.

Tracy was a lawyer active in Republican Party politics during the 1850s. He was a member of the New York State Assembly (Tioga County) in 1862.

He served in the Union Army during the Civil War, and commanded the 109th New York Infantry Regiment. At the Battle of the Wilderness in May, 1864, he was able to rally his men and hold the Union line. For his actions he subsequently was awarded the Medal of Honor. His citation reads: Tracy "seized the colors and led the regiment when other regiments had retired and then reformed his line and held it." Later that year, he became commandant of the Elmira prisoner of war camp, before being appointed Colonel of the 127th Infantry, U.S. Colored Troops, on August 23, 1864. Tracy was discharged from the volunteer service on June 13, 1865. On January 18, 1867, President Andrew Johnson nominated Tracy for appointment to the brevet grade of brigadier general of volunteers, to rank from March 13, 1865, and the U.S. Senate confirmed the appointment on February 21, 1867.

He resumed the practice of law after the war, and became active in New York state politics. He was United States Attorney for the Eastern District of New York from 1866 to 1877. In December 1881, he was appointed by Governor Alonzo B. Cornell to the New York Court of Appeals to fill the vacancy caused by the appointment of Judge Charles Andrews as Chief Judge after the resignation of Charles J. Folger. Tracy remained on the bench until the end of 1882 when Andrews resumed his seat after being defeated by William C. Ruger in the election for Chief Judge.

In 1875, Tracy defended the well-known preacher Henry Ward Beecher during his highly publicized trial for adultery.

On March 5, 1889, Tracy was nominated by President Benjamin Harrison to become Secretary of the Navy and was confirmed by the Senate in a ten-minute session without objection. He formally took office on March 6.

On February 3, 1890, Tracy's wife and younger daughter died in a fire at their residence in Washington, D.C. His wife, Belinda, died by falling out a window in an attempt to escape the building, and his daughter, Mary, died from smoke inhalation. Tracy himself lost consciousness due to the smoke but was rescued by Chief Joseph Parris of the D.C. Fire Department. The secretary's elder daughter, Emma (Mrs. Ferdinand Suydam Wilmerding), and his granddaughter, Alice Wilmerding, sustained injuries from jumping out a window, but both survived. After regaining consciousness some time later, Tracy learned of the deaths of his loved ones from President Harrison. A funeral was held at the White House several days later, and the bodies of the dead were buried in Rock Creek Cemetery. Following a brief period of mourning, during which he received many messages of condolences from heads of state and other prominent individuals, Tracy returned to his official duties.

Tracy was noted for his role in the creation of the "New Navy", a major reform of the service, which had fallen into obsolescence after the Civil War. Like President Harrison, he supported a naval strategy focused more on offense, rather than on coastal defense and commerce raiding. A major ally in this effort was naval theorist Captain Alfred Thayer Mahan, who had served as a professor at the new Naval War College (founded 1884). In 1890, Mahan published his major work, The Influence of Sea Power upon History, 1660–1783—a book that achieved an international readership. Drawing on historical examples, Mahan supported the construction of a "blue-water Navy" that could do battle on the high seas.

Tracy also supported the construction of modern warships. On June 30, 1890, Congress passed the Naval Appropriations Act for Fiscal Year 1891 (also known as the Battleship Act of 1890), a measure which authorized the construction of three battleships. The first three were later named USS Indiana (BB-1), USS Massachusetts (BB-2), and USS Oregon (BB-3). The battleship USS Iowa (BB-4) was authorized two years later.

In the 1896 presidential election, Tracy was a presidential elector for William McKinley and Garret Hobart.

After leaving the Navy Department, Tracy again took up his legal practice. In 1896 he defended New York City Police commissioner Andrew Parker from accusations of negligence and incompetence by fellow commissioner Theodore Roosevelt in a performance that significantly embarrassed Roosevelt. He also helped end the Venezuela Crisis of 1895 by assisting Venezuela in negotiating a settlement to their boundary dispute with Great Britain.

Tracy was the Republican candidate to be the first Mayor of Greater New York City when the five boroughs consolidated in 1898. He came in third behind Democrat Robert A. Van Wyck and Seth Low of the Citizens' Union, winning 101,863 of the 523,560 votes cast in the election of 1897. Tracy was the president of the New York State Agricultural Society in 1897 and 1898, during which time he invited Van Wyck to attend the society's annual fair.

On April 3, 1900, seven men from the International Banking and Trust Company were elected as directors of the North American Trust Company. They included president Oakleigh Thorne of the International, as well as Tracy.

== Family and death ==
In 1851 Benjamin Tracy married Belinda E. Catlin (1832–1890), a sister of General Isaac S. Catlin. They had four children: “Frank” Brodhead Tracy (1856–1945); Emma Eloise Tracy (1862–1934) who married Ferdinand Suydam Wilmerding (1850–1877) (their daughter Alys christened the USS Maine); Mary “Maisie” Farrington Tracy (1864–1890); and Benjamin Franklin Tracy III (d. 1895);

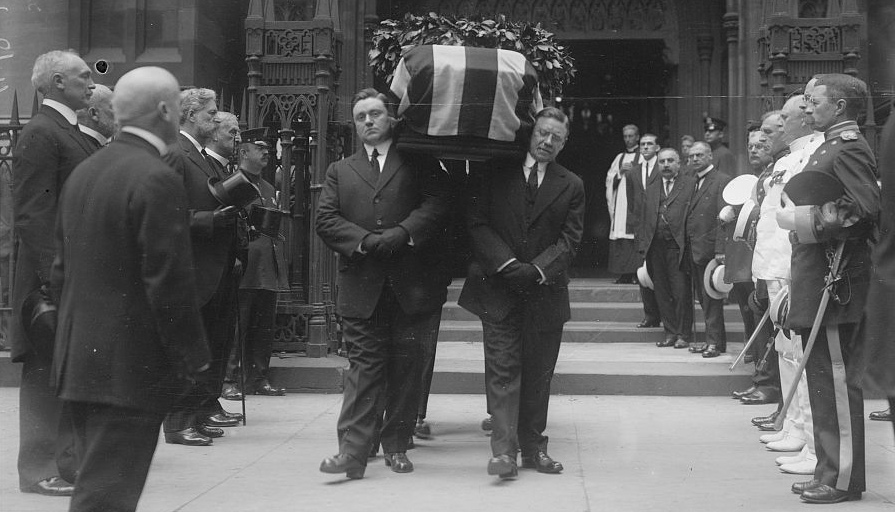
Tracy's body carried from Trinity Church

Tracy died at his farm in Tioga County, New York, on August 6, 1915, at 3:30 pm at the home of his daughter following a stroke. A funeral was held at Trinity Church in Manhattan on August 9, and he was buried in a family plot in Green-Wood Cemetery in Brooklyn.

== Medal of Honor citation ==

Rank and organization: Colonel, 109th New York Infantry.

Place and date: At Wilderness, Va., 6 May 1864.

Entered service at: Owego, N.Y.

Born: 26 April 1830, Owego, N.Y.

Date of issue: 21 June 1895.

Citation: Seized the colors and led the regiment when other regiments had retired and then reformed his line and held it.

== Namesake ==
USS Tracy (DD-214) was named for him, as was the town of Tracyton, Washington.

Tracy Arm is a fjord in the U.S. state of Alaska that bears his name.

The Tracy Glacier, having its terminus near the head of the Inglefield Fjord in northwestern Greenland, was named after him by Robert Peary.

== See also ==
- List of American Civil War Medal of Honor recipients: T–Z

== Notes ==
New York State Assembly
Preceded by Cero F. Barber	New York State Assembly; Tioga County; 1862	Succeeded by Nathaniel W. Davis
Legal offices
Preceded by Benjamin D. Silliman	U.S. Attorney for the Eastern District of New York; 1866–1877	Succeeded by Asa W. Tenney
Government offices
Preceded by William C. Whitney	United States Secretary of the Navy; 1889–1893	Succeeded by Hilary A. Herbert
