= Cornelius W. Armstrong =

American politician (1827–1883)

Cornelius W. Armstrong (December 18, 1827 – April 16, 1883) was an American merchant and politician from New York.

== Biography ==
Cornelius W. Armstrong was born on December 18, 1827, in Hoosick, Rensselaer County, New York, the son of Alvin Armstrong. He attended the common schools. In 1843, he began to work as a clerk in Penn Yan. In 1847, he moved to Wayne County, and later to Albany. There he engaged in the wholesale of produce, and entered politics as a Democrat.

Armstrong was a member of the New York State Assembly (Albany Co., 3rd D.) in 1858.

At the New York state election, 1865, he ran for Canal Commissioner, but was defeated by Republican Robert C. Dorn. He was a presidential elector in 1868.

Armstrong was Clerk of the New York State Assembly from January 1, 1868, to January 5, 1869, officiating in the 91st New York State Legislature; and again from January 4, 1870, to January 2, 1872, officiating in the 93rd and 94th New York State Legislatures. In 1871, he supervised the publication of A Compilation of Cases of Breaches of Privilege of the House in the Assembly of the State of New York (251 pg.).

Cornelius W. Armstrong died on April 16, 1883, at the age of 56.

New York State Assembly
Preceded by John Evers	New York State Assembly; Albany County, 3rd District; 1858	Succeeded by William A. Young
Government offices
Preceded by Luther Caldwell	Clerk of the New York State Assembly; 1868–1869	Succeeded by Edward F. Underhill
Preceded by Edward F. Underhill	Clerk of the New York State Assembly; 1870–1872	Succeeded by Cornelius S. Underwood
