= Mark D. Wilber =

American politician

Mark Dodge Wilber (August 12, 1829 – November 19, 1915) was an American lawyer and politician.

== Life ==
Wilber was born on August 12, 1829, in Pleasant Plains, New York, the son of John Wilber and Keziah C. Dodge.

Wilber attended Fairfield Academy for two years, but had to leave for health reasons. He then began to travel to recuperate his strength; he travelled to the major cities in the United States and Cuba, spent several weeks in New Granada, visited Central America and Mexico, and arrived in San Francisco, California. He was involved in trade, mining, and agriculture, and had the first threshing machine on the Pacific Coast built. He was president of the Settlers' Association from 1851 to 1852. In 1852, he stumped the state campaigning for Pierce and ran for the California State Assembly in Sacramento County. He lost the election due to ballot-stuffing and a fire that burned in the city on election night.

Wilber returned to New York in 1853. He studied law in Yale Law School. He graduated from there and was admitted to the New York bar in 1856. He then began practicing in New York City while residing in Poughkeepsie. He also studied law in the State and National Law School. He was one of the incorporators of the Poughkeepsie Bridge. He served as Attorney for the Poughkeepsie and Eastern Railway, the Poughkeepsie City Railroad Company, the Poughkeepsie Citizens' Mutual Gas Company, and the Eureka Mowing Machine Company, and was a lecturer on commercial law in the Eastman National Business College.

During the American Civil War, he helped organize soldiers for the Union Army. In 1862, he became the quartermaster of the 159th New York Volunteer Infantry. He then served on the staff of General Halbert E. Paine in the Department of the Gulf. He resigned a year later for health reasons. He was later appointed Judge-Advocate-General of the 8th Brigade, 2nd Division of the New York National Guard.

In 1864, Wilber was elected to the New York State Assembly as a Republican, representing the Dutchess County 2nd District. He served in the Assembly in 1865, 1866, and 1867. Although Wilber was a Democrat since he was in California, he became a Republican due to his war associations. He became a Democrat again during President Grant's second term in reaction to the administration's corruption.

In 1870, Wilber moved to Allegan, Michigan, where he was vice-president of the First National Bank of Allegan. In 1872, he was elected to the Michigan State Senate as a Republican, representing Michigan's 14th Senate district (Allegan County). He served in the State Senate from 1873 to 1874. In the 1874 United States House of Representatives election, he was the Democratic candidate for Michigan's 5th congressional district. He lost the election to William B. Williams.

In 1877, Wilber returned to Poughkeepsie. He moved to Brooklyn shortly afterwards. In 1885, President Cleveland appointed him United States Attorney for the Eastern District of New York. He later moved to Darien, Connecticut, where he organized the Home Bank and Trust Company and served as its first president.

Wilber travelled extensively since his youth, when he and a friend travelled to Washington D.C. and attended a reception of President Polk at the White House. In the early 1890s he travelled to the Arctic Ocean via the McKenzie River. In 1909, when he was nearly 80, he spent six months on a tour of Egypt and the Holy Land.

Wilber was a member of the Freemasons, the Grand Army of the Republic, and the Military Order of the Loyal Legion.

Wilber died at his home in Darien on November 19, 1915. He was buried in the Poughkeepsie Rural Cemetery.

New York State Assembly
Preceded by John N. Cramer	New York State Assembly; Dutchess County, 2nd District; 1865-1867	Succeeded by Alfred T. Ackert
Legal offices
Preceded by Asa Wentworth Tenney	U.S. Attorney for the Eastern District of New York; 1885-1889	Succeeded by Jesse Johnson
