= Clerk of the New York State Assembly =

The Clerk of the New York State Assembly heads the administration of the New York State Assembly. The outgoing clerk of the previous session presides over a new Assembly until a Speaker is elected. Subsequently a clerk is elected by the members of the Assembly. The clerk is the nominal author of the Assembly's legislative journals. The clerk appoints most of the Assembly's employees, like deputy clerks, assistant clerks, committee clerks, pages and janitors. Many clerks have been elected members of the Assembly, either before or after their clerkships.

== List ==
Name	Took office	Left office	Party	Notes
John McKesson	September 1, 1777	January 7, 1794	Democratic-Republican	
Oliver L. Ker	January 7, 1794	November 1, 1796	Federalist	
James Van Ingen	November 1, 1796	January 25, 1803	Federalist	
Solomon Southwick	January 25, 1803	January 27, 1807	Democratic-Republican	
Gerrit Y. Lansing	January 27, 1807	January 26, 1808	Dem.-Rep./Lewisite	
Daniel Rodman	January 26, 1808	January 30, 1810	Dem.-Rep./Clintonian	
James Van Ingen	January 30, 1810	January 29, 1811	Federalist	
Samuel North	January 29, 1811	November 3, 1812	Democratic-Republican	
James Van Ingen	November 3, 1812	September 26, 1814	Federalist	
Aaron Clark	September 26, 1814	November 7, 1820	Dem.-Rep./Clintonian	
Dirck L. Vanderheyden	November 7, 1820	January 2, 1822	Dem.-Rep./Bucktail	
Edward Livingston	January 2, 1822	January 4, 1825	Dem.-Rep./Bucktail	Assemblyman 1833, 1835 and 1837; Speaker 1837
Horatio Merchant	January 4, 1825	January 3, 1826	People's Party/Clintonian	
Edward Livingston	January 3, 1826	January 1, 1828	Dem.-Rep./Bucktail	Assemblyman 1833, 1835 and 1837; Speaker 1837
Francis Seger	January 1, 1828	January 7, 1834	Jacksonian	State Senator 1834–1837
Philip Reynolds Jr.	January 7, 1834	January 2, 1838	Democrat	
Jarvis N. Lake	January 2, 1838	January 7, 1840	Whig	
Philander B. Prindle	January 7, 1840	January 4, 1842	Whig	
John O. Cole	January 4, 1842	January 3, 1843	Democrat	
Henry N. Wales	January 3, 1843	January 2, 1844	Democrat	
James R. Rose	January 2, 1844	January 6, 1846	Democrat	
William W. Dean	January 6, 1846	January 5, 1847	Democrat	
Philander B. Prindle	January 5, 1847	January 1, 1850	Whig	
James R. Rose	January 1, 1850	January 7, 1851	Democrat	
Richard U. Sherman	January 7, 1851	January 6, 1857	Whig	Assemblyman 1857 and 1875–1876
William Richardson	January 6, 1857	January 26, 1858	Republican	
David Wilson	January 26, 1858	January 4, 1859	American	Assemblyman 1852
William Richardson	January 4, 1859	January 1, 1861	Republican	
Hanson A. Risley	January 1, 1861	January 7, 1862	Republican	
Joseph B. Cushman	January 7, 1862	January 1, 1867	Republican	
Luther Caldwell	January 1, 1867	January 7, 1868	Republican	
Cornelius W. Armstrong	January 1, 1868	January 5, 1869	Democrat	Assemblyman 1858
Edward F. Underhill	January 5, 1869	January 4, 1870	Republican	
Cornelius W. Armstrong	January 4, 1870	January 2, 1872	Democrat	Assemblyman 1858
Cornelius S. Underwood	January 2, 1872	April 30, 1872	Republican	died in office
Edward M. Johnson	May 1, 1872	January 7, 1873	Republican	
John O'Donnell	January 7, 1873	January 5, 1875	Republican	Assemblyman 1864; State Senator 1866–1869
Hiram Calkins	January 5, 1875	January 4, 1876	Democrat	Clerk of the State Senate 1870–1871
Edward M. Johnson	January 4, 1876	January 2, 1883	Republican	
Walter H. Bunn	January 2, 1883	January 1, 1884	Democrat	
Charles A. Chickering	January 1, 1884	January 6, 1891	Republican	Assemblyman 1879–1881
Charles R. DeFreest	January 6, 1891	January 2, 1894	Democrat	
George W. Dunn	January 2, 1894	January 2, 1895	Republican	
Archie E. Baxter	January 2, 1895	January 1, 1908	Republican	
Ray B. Smith	January 1, 1908	January 4, 1911	Republican	
Luke McHenry	January 4, 1911	September 17, 1911	Democrat	died in office
George R. Van Namee	September 17, 1911	January 3, 1912	Democrat	acting since September 6 while McHenry was ill
Fred W. Hammond	January 3, 1912	January 1, 1913	Republican	Assemblyman 1901–1909 and 1911
George R. Van Namee	January 1, 1913	January 7, 1914	Democrat	
Fred W. Hammond	January 7, 1914	January 2, 1935	Republican	Assemblyman 1901–1909 and 1911
Homer W. Storey	January 2, 1935	January 1, 1936	Democrat	
Ansley B. Borkowski	January 1, 1936	February 9, 1965	Republican	Assemblyman 1921 and 1924–1930
John T. McKennan	February 9, 1965	January 8, 1969	Democrat	State Senator 1949–1950
Donald A. Campbell	January 8, 1969	February 1973	Republican	Assemblyman 1951–1968; resigned
Thomas H. Bartzos	February 1973	January 8, 1975	Republican	acting in 1973
Catherine A. Carey	January 8, 1975	January 9, 1985	Democrat	
Francine Misasi	January 9, 1985	January 2001	Democrat	

== Sources ==
- New York Red Book (2005–2006; pg. 411)
