= John T. McKennan =

American politician (1918–2011)

Mayor of Utica, New York
- In office 1956–1959
- Preceded by: Boyd Golder
- Succeeded by: Frank M. Dulan

Member of the New York Senate from the 41st district
- In office 1949–1950

Clerk of the New York State Assembly
- In office February 9, 1965 – January 8, 1969

Justice of the New York Supreme Court 5th district
- In office March 1982 – December 1982

Personal details
- Born: November 25, 1918
- Died: November 28, 2011 (aged 93)
- Occupation: Lawyer

John T. McKennan (November 25, 1918 – November 28, 2011) was an American lawyer and politician from New York.

== Life ==
John T. McKennan was born on November 25, 1918, in Utica, Oneida County, New York, the son of John P. McKennan and Rena Dowd McKennan. He attended Our Lady of Lourdes School, Utica Free Academy and Scarborough Day School. He graduated from Syracuse University and Albany Law School. During World War II he served in the U.S. armed forces. After the war he practiced law with a firm in New York City until 1947 when he returned to Utica.

McKennan entered politics as a Democrat, and was Assistant Corporation Counsel of Utica; Counsel to the Municipal Water Works of Utica. In 1948, he was elected to the New York State Senate (41st D.) and served one term in then 1949 and 1950. At only age 29, this made McKennan the youngest person elected to the New York State Senate until the election of David Carlucci in 2010.

On May 7, 1955, he married Marguerite Gallagher, and they had three sons.

McKennan was Mayor of Utica from 1956 to 1959. As mayor, McKennan was best known for spearheading the construction of the Utica Memorial Auditorium (now known as the Adirondack Bank Center) and securing the funding from Governor W. Averell Harriman for the North-South Arterial Highway. His other accomplishments included the construction of Valley View Golf Club and the first public swimming pool located in North Utica. A wide-ranging corruption scandal resulted in the indictment of numerous Utica city employees during his term, but he himself was not indicted. He did not run for reelection in 1959, instead running for City Judge of Utica, but was defeated by Matthew S. Ogonowski Sr.

McKennan was Clerk of the New York State Assembly from February 9, 1965, to January 8, 1969, officiating in the 175th, 176th and 177th New York State Legislatures. He was also elected unanimously by delegates of all political parties to serve as Secretary of the New York State Constitutional Convention of 1967.

In March 1982, Governor Hugh Carey appointed McKennan to the New York Supreme Court (5th D.) to fill the vacancy caused by the appointment of Richard J. Cardamone to the U.S. Court of Appeals for the Second Circuit. In November 1982, McKennan ran for a full term, but was defeated, and left the bench at the end of the year.

In 1988, McKennan was appointed as a Judicial Hearing Officer by the Chief Administrative Judge of the State. The Board of Regents of the University of the State of New York appointed him to its review board for licensed professionals. In 1999, he was appointed as a Judicial Hearing Officer for the State Retirement System.

John T. McKennan died on November 28, 2011, in New Hartford, New York; and was buried at the St. Bernards Cemetery in Waterville.

New York State Senate
Preceded by Robert C. Groben	New York State Senate; 41st District; 1949–1950	Succeeded by Fred J. Rath
Government offices
Preceded by Ansley B. Borkowski	Clerk of the New York State Assembly; 1965–1969	Succeeded by Donald A. Campbell
