= Fred W. Hammond =

American politician

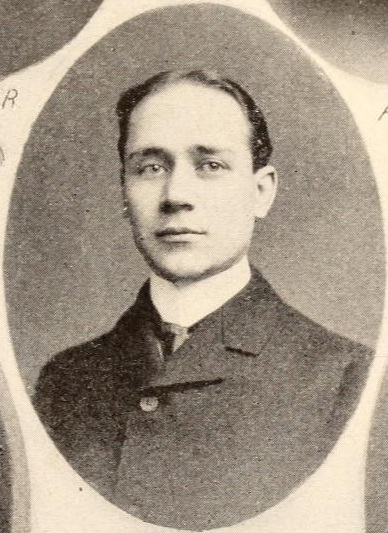
Fred W. Hammond (1902)

Fred W. Hammond (July 21, 1872 – January 7, 1942) was an American lawyer and politician from New York.

== Early life ==
He was born on July 21, 1872, in Canastota, Madison County, New York, the son of Henry Clay Hammond (1844–1918) and Amorette A. (Brown) Hammond (1846–1939). The family removed to Utica where he attended the graded schools. In 1885, the family moved to Syracuse. There he attended grammar school, and graduated from Syracuse High School in 1891. Then he attended business college, studied law, was admitted to the bar in 1894, and practiced in Syracuse. He was a member of the Board of Supervisors of Onondaga County (Syracuse, 13th Ward) from 1897 to 1900.

== Career ==
Hammond was a member of the New York State Assembly in 1901, 1902, 1903, 1904, 1905, 1906, 1907, 1908, 1909 and 1911; and was Chairman of the Committee on Revision in 1903, and Chairman of the Committee on Affairs of Cities in 1908 and 1909.

He was Clerk of the New York State Assembly in 1912, and from 1914 to 1934, officiating in the 135th, 137th, 138th, 139th, 140th, 141st, 142nd, 143rd, 144th, 145th, 146th, 147th, 148th, 149th, 150th, 151st, 152nd, 153rd, 154th, 155th, 156th and 157th New York State Legislatures. At the beginning of the 157th Session, the Republican Party was split, and no Clerk could be elected. On January 12, Speaker Joseph A. McGinnies appointed Hammond without election. At the end of this term, Hammond retired, citing health problems.

He died on January 7, 1942, at his home in Syracuse, New York; and was buried at the Oakwood Cemetery there.

New York State Assembly
Preceded by John T. Delaney	New York State Assembly; Onondaga County, 4th District; 1901–1906	Succeeded by district abolished
Preceded by Edward Schoeneck	New York State Assembly; Onondaga County, 2nd District; 1907–1909	Succeeded by John T. Roberts
Preceded by John T. Roberts	New York State Assembly; Onondaga County, 2nd District; 1911	Succeeded by David L. Edwards
Government offices
Preceded by George R. Van Namee	Clerk of the New York State Assembly; 1912–1913	Succeeded by George R. Van Namee
Preceded by George R. Van Namee	Clerk of the New York State Assembly; 1914–1935	Succeeded by Homer W. Storey
