= Michael A. Cardozo =

American lawyer (1941–2025)

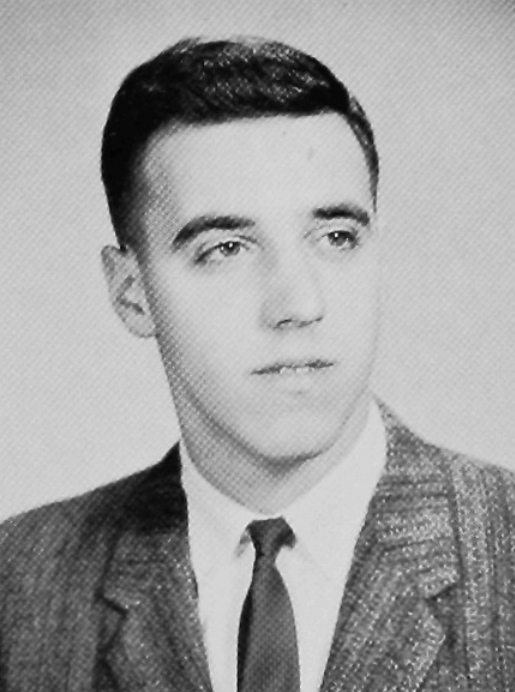
- Cardozo in the Brown University yearbook, 1963

77th Corporation Counsel of New York City
- In office January 1, 2002 – December 31, 2013
- Mayor: Michael Bloomberg
- Preceded by: Michael D. Hess
- Succeeded by: Zachary W. Carter

Personal details
- Born: June 28, 1941 New York City, U.S.
- Died: July 23, 2025 (aged 84) White Plains, New York, U.S.
- Spouse: Nancy Caryn Cogut (m. 1965)
- Children: 2
- Education: Columbia Law School
- Occupation: Lawyer

Michael A. Cardozo (June 28, 1941 – July 23, 2025) was an American lawyer. From 2002 through the end of 2013, he was the Corporation Counsel for the Government of New York City, appointed by Mayor Michael Bloomberg. Cardozo was a partner at the law firm Proskauer Rose, and a former president of the New York City Bar Association.

== Early life and education ==
Michael A. Cardozo was born on June 28, 1941, in New York City to homemaker Lucile and real estate broker Harmon Cardozo. He grew up on the Upper West Side of New York City, before moving to Westport, Connecticut while in grade school. He received a Bachelor of Arts in political science in 1963 from Brown University, and his Juris Doctor degree in 1966 from Columbia Law School. He clerked for Judge Edward Cochrane McLean from 1966 to 1967.

== Career ==
In 1967, Cardozo joined the law firm of Proskauer Rose and became a member of the Litigation Department. He became a partner in 1974 and served in that capacity until 2002, when he was appointed Corporation Counsel of New York City. While at Proskauer, Cardozo helped to develop the firm's sports law practice and represented, among other clients, the National Basketball Association, the National Hockey League, and Major League Soccer. Cardozo was elected three times to the firm's executive committee and co-chaired its litigation department from 1987 to 1991.

In 2002, Mayor Michael Bloomberg appointed him the City's 77th Corporation Counsel, the City's chief legal officer. He held that role for 12 years, for the full three-term tenure of the Mayor, the longest anyone has served in that capacity since the Office was created in the mid-19th century. Under Cardozo, the city vigorously defended stop-and-frisk practices. He also worked to address illegal guns, and on initiatives to ban smoking and require calorie information to be posted in restaurants. In 2009, 18 of 20 judges from the First Judicial Department of the Appellate Division of the New York Supreme Court signed a letter rebuking Cardozo for his "imperious" criticisms of the court's culture, which he had said was introducing delays.

From 1996 to 1998, Cardozo was president of the New York City Bar Association.

In 2014, Cardozo was succeeded by Zachary W. Carter. That year, he returned to Proskauer. In 2019, he successfully represented Judith Alice Clark, the getaway driver in the 1981 Brink's robbery, in seeking parole after having served 39 years in prison. Cardozo retired from Proskauer at the end of October 2022. In September 2022, New York Governor Kathy Hochul appointed Cardozo to the New York State Commission on Ethics and Lobbying in Government. He was re-appointed in 2024.

Cardozo was a longtime member of the board of the Citizens Union government reform organization. He was a member of the advisory board of the legal education non-profit Legal Outreach. He also served as Chair of the Columbia Law School Board of Visitors, and the Fund for Modern Courts, a non-partisan citizen organization devoted to improving New York State courts. He also previously chaired the New York State Commission on Legislative, Judicial and Executive Compensation. He chaired two court-system task forces appointed by New York Governor Mario Cuomo and Chief Judge of the New York Court of Appeals Sol Wachtler.

== Personal life and death ==
Cardozo married Nancy Caryn Cardozo (née Cogut) in 1965. They had two children. Cardozo split his time between New York City and Scarsdale, New York. Cardozo's great grandfather's first cousin was United States Supreme Court Justice Benjamin Cardozo.

Cardozo died after a brief illness on July 23, 2025, at the age of 84.

== Awards ==
- American Friends of the Hebrew University's George A. Katz Torch of Learning Award, 2000
- Columbia Law School Lawrence Wien Prize for Social Responsibility, 2007
- Fund for Modern Courts Cyrus R. Vance Tribute, 2009
- Federal Bar Council Emory Buckner Award for Outstanding Public Service, 2011
- New York Law Journal's Impact Award, 2013
- Citizens Union Public Service Award, 2014
- Fund for Modern Courts Career Public Service Award, 2014
- American Lawyer Lifetime Achievement Award, 2015
- New York Urban League Frederick Douglas Medallion for Leadership and Service, 2016
- Anti-Defamation League Human Relations Award, 2017
