= James D. Bell =

American politician

James David Bell (September 29, 1845 – November 1, 1919) was an American lawyer from New York.

== Life ==
Bell was born in New York City, New York, on September 29, 1845. He was of Welsh parentage.

Bell was attending the College of the City of New York as part of its Class of 1863 when the American Civil War broke out. Although he was only 16 at the time, he managed to convinced the recruiting officers he was old enough to enlist. He enlisted in October 1861 and was mustered in as a private in Company B of the 1st New York Mounted Rifles Regiment. He was promoted to corporal later that month. He was wounded in battle on the Blackwater River in November 1862. He was promoted to sergeant in December 1862. He re-enlisted in February 1864. He was promoted to commissary sergeant in July 1864, regimental commissary sergeant in October 1864, and later that month to first sergeant of Company E. He was captured in Weldon, North Carolina, in April 1865. He was released at Sister's Ferry, Georgia, in May 1865. He was mustered out in June 1865.

After the end of his military service, Bell spent the next eight years working with newspapers, starting as a staff member for the New York Graphic. After the paper was suspended, he became a Washington correspondent for the New York World. He later worked for the paper as an editorial writer, and it was during that point he began studying law. In 1871 he moved to Williamsburg. He was admitted to the bar in 1880 and became a member of the law firm Daily & Bell. Frederick E. Crane later joined the law firm and it became known as Daily, Bell & Crane. He was a trustee of the Brooklyn Law Library, an organizer, trustee and president of the Brooklyn Bar Association, member and vice president of the New York State Bar Association, a member of the American Bar Association and president of the Law Department of the International Institute of Arts and Science. He later moved to Flatbush, buying a house in Prospect Park South.

In 1885, Bell was elected town supervisor as a Democrat for the 19th Ward. In the 1886 United States House of Representatives election, he was the Democratic candidate for New York's 3rd congressional district. He lost the election to Stephen V. White. In 1888, he was appointed Police and Excise Commissioner. In 1895, he was the Democratic candidate for Kings County District Attorney. He was a delegate to and vice president of the 1896 Democratic National Convention and was a delegate to the 1904 Democratic National Convention. He served as Commissioner and Secretary of the Williamsburg Bridge Commission for ten years. From 1904 to 1914, he was Assistant Corporation Counsel in charge of Brooklyn. In 1906, he unsuccessfully ran for the New York Supreme Court. In February 1919, he became United States Attorney for the Eastern District of New York as a temporary appointment. He also served as chairman of the Kings County Democratic County Committee for many years.

Bell was an active member of the Grand Army of the Republic. He was a charter member and commander of his local post. He served as chief mustering officer, judge advocate, senior vice department commander, and department commander of the Department of New York. In the September 1919 National Encampment, he was elected the Grand Army of the Republic Commander-in-Chief.

Bell served as the Grand Marshal of the Brooklyn Memorial Day Parade five times. He was a member of the Brooklyn Club, the Hanover Club, the Brooklyn League, the Royal Arcanum, and the Elks. He also owned one of the largest private libraries in Brooklyn, with almost 10,000 books and a number of rare volumes and first editions, including copies of the original Federalist Papers. He was a member of the Long Island Historical Society, the American Academy of Political and Social Sciences, and the Seldon Society of London. In 1872, he married Matilda Hamilton. Their children were Alfred, Viloa, Ida, and Mrs. Clarence A. Hebb. Alfred was a well-known Brooklyn physician.

Bell died at home from hardened arteries on November 1, 1919. He was buried in Cedar Grove Cemetery.

Legal offices
| Preceded by Melville J. France | U.S. Attorney for the Eastern District of New York; 1919 | Succeeded by LeRoy W. Ross |
