= Charles L. Benedict =

American judge

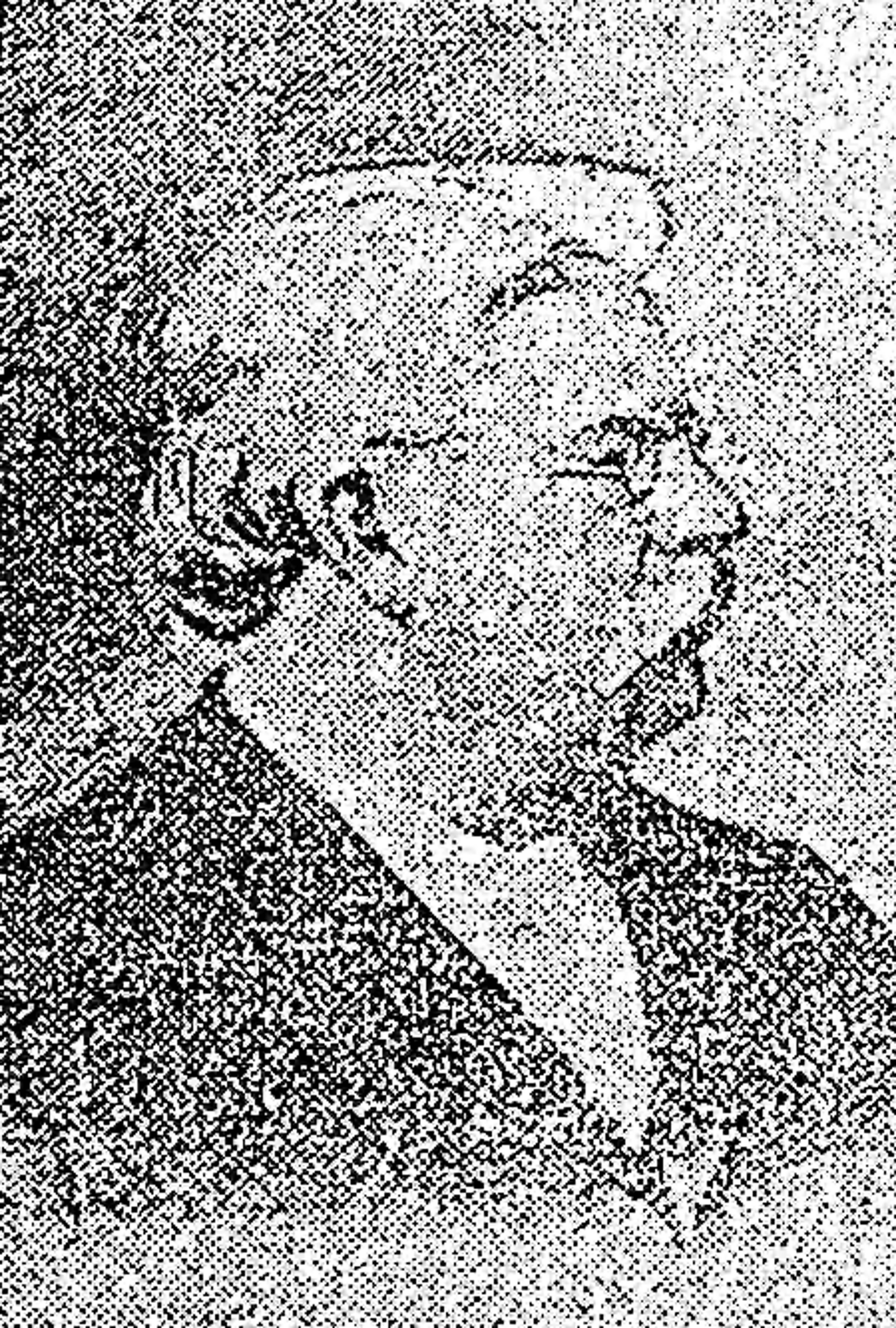

Judge of the United States District Court for the Eastern District of New York
- In office March 9, 1865 – January 1, 1897
- Appointed by: Abraham Lincoln
- Preceded by: Seat established by 13 Stat. 438
- Succeeded by: Asa Wentworth Tenney

Personal details
- Born: Charles Linnaeus Benedict; March 2, 1824 Newbury, Vermont
- Died: January 8, 1901 (aged 76) Brooklyn, New York
- Education: University of Vermont read law

Charles Linnaeus Benedict (March 2, 1824 – January 8, 1901) was a United States district judge of the United States District Court for the Eastern District of New York.

== Education and career ==
Born on March 2, 1824, in Newbury, Vermont, Benedict graduated from the University of Vermont in 1844 and read law in 1845. He was a grammar school principal until 1845. He entered private practice in Brooklyn, New York from 1845 to 1865. He was a member of the New York State Assembly starting in 1863.

== Federal judicial service ==
Benedict was nominated by President Abraham Lincoln on March 6, 1865, to the United States District Court for the Eastern District of New York, to a new seat authorized by 13 Stat. 438. He was confirmed by the United States Senate on March 9, 1865, and received his commission the same day. His service terminated on January 1, 1897, due to his retirement.

=== Notable case ===
Among his many cases, Benedict signed the arrest warrant of Captain Henry W. Howgate on September 29, 1894.

== Death ==
Benedict died on January 8, 1901, in Brooklyn.

== See also ==
- List of United States federal judges by longevity of service

== Sources ==
New York State Assembly
Preceded by Lucius C. Andrus	New York State Assembly Kings County, 5th District; 1862	Succeeded by Theophilus C. Callicot
Legal offices
Preceded by Seat established by 13 Stat. 438	Judge of the United States District Court for the Eastern District of New York; 1865–1897	Succeeded by Asa Wentworth Tenney
