= Ansley B. Borkowski =

American politician

Ansley Bernard Borkowski (January 15, 1898 – December 1, 1992) was an American lawyer and politician from New York.

== Life ==
He was born on January 15, 1898, in Buffalo, New York. He attended Canisius High School and Canisius College. He graduated from University of Buffalo Law School, and practiced law in Buffalo.

Borkowski was a Republican member of the New York State Assembly (Erie Co., 5th D.) in 1921, 1924, 1925, 1926, 1927, 1928, 1929 and 1930. He was Chairman of the Committee on General Laws from 1927 to 1930.

He was Clerk of the New York State Assembly from 1936 to 1964, officiating in the 159th, 160th, 161st, 162nd, 163rd, 164th, 165th, 166th, 167th, 168th, 169th, 170th, 171st, 172nd, 173rd and 174th New York State Legislatures. In January 1965, Borkowski opened the proceedings for the election of a Speaker in the 175th New York State Legislature, as the outgoing clerk traditionally did. This was the first time since 1935 that a Democratic majority was elected to the Assembly, but due to a split into two factions—one following Mayor of New York City Robert F. Wagner, Jr., the other following U.S. Senator Robert F. Kennedy—no Speaker could be elected. Borkowski presided over a month of deadlock until the election of Anthony J. Travia as Speaker on February 4 with the votes of the Wagner men and the Republicans. Subsequently the Assembly was organized and Democrat John T. McKennan was elected to succeed Borkowski.

He died on December 1, 1992, in Buffalo, New York; and was buried at the St. Stanislaus Catholic Cemetery in Cheektowaga.

== Sources ==
New York State Assembly
Preceded by Alexander A. Patrzykowski	New York State Assembly; Erie County, 5th District; 1921	Succeeded by Alexander A. Patrzykowski
Preceded by John Krysinski	New York State Assembly; Erie County, 5th District; 1924–1930	Succeeded by Edwin L. Kantowski
Government offices
Preceded by Homer W. Storey	Clerk of the New York State Assembly; 1936–1965	Succeeded by John T. McKennan
