= George R. Van Namee =

American politician

George Rivet Van Namee (December 23, 1877 – December 6, 1949) was an American lawyer and politician from New York.

== Life ==
Van Namee was born on December 23, 1877, in Watertown, New York, the son of Eugene Clinton Van Namee and Adele Rivet. His maternal grandparents were French immigrants from Eastern France.

Van Namee graduated from Watertown High School in 1896. In 1898, he entered Cornell University, where he was a member of Psi Upsilon and Phi Delta Phi. He graduated from Cornell with an LL.B. in 1902, and was admitted to the bar in 1901. He initially mainly worked for his father, a prominent pharmacist, and only partly worked in law. In 1907, he left the drug business and turned exclusively to his law practice and politics.

From 1907 to 1916, Van Namee was the chairman of the Jefferson County Democratic Committee. From 1912 to 1915, he was the assistant secretary of the New York State Democratic Committee. He served as Assistant Clerk of the New York State Assembly under Luke McHenry in 1911. When McHenry died that year, he was elected Clerk for the rest of the year. He was again elected Clerk of the Assembly in 1913. He served as a Commissioner of the Legislative Bill Drafting Commission from its organization in December 1913 until January 1919, when he was appointed secretary to Governor Smith. In 1920, he was appointed a member of the New York Public Service Commission. In 1923, Governor Smith again appointed him his private secretary, and in 1924 he was appointed back to the Public Service Commission.

In 1928, Van Namee was campaign manager for Smith's presidential campaign and Franklin D. Roosevelt's gubernatorial campaign. He was also campaign manager for Robert F. Wagner's 1932 senatorial campaign. He was reappointed to the Public Service Commission by Governor Lehman in 1933. He served on the Commission until 1943, when he retired from the Commission. He then began working for the law firm Le Boeuf and Lamb on 15 Broad Street, New York City. He was also appointed to the Cornell Board of Trustees by Governor Smith, and was reappointed to the board by Governors Roosevelt and Lehman.

Van Namee was a member of the Elks, the New York State Bar Association and the Manhattan Club. He was Catholic. In 1914, he married Gertrude L. Norris. She died in 1923. In 1927, he married Rose Fallon.

Van Namee died of pneumonia at St. Luke's Hospital on December 6, 1949. He was buried in Calvary Cemetery in Queens.

Government offices
Preceded by Luke McHenry	Clerk of the New York State Assembly; 1911	Succeeded by Fred W. Hammond
Preceded by Fred W. Hammond	Clerk of the New York State Assembly; 1913	Succeeded by Fred W. Hammond
