= Breon Peace =

American lawyer (born 1971)

Breon S. Peace
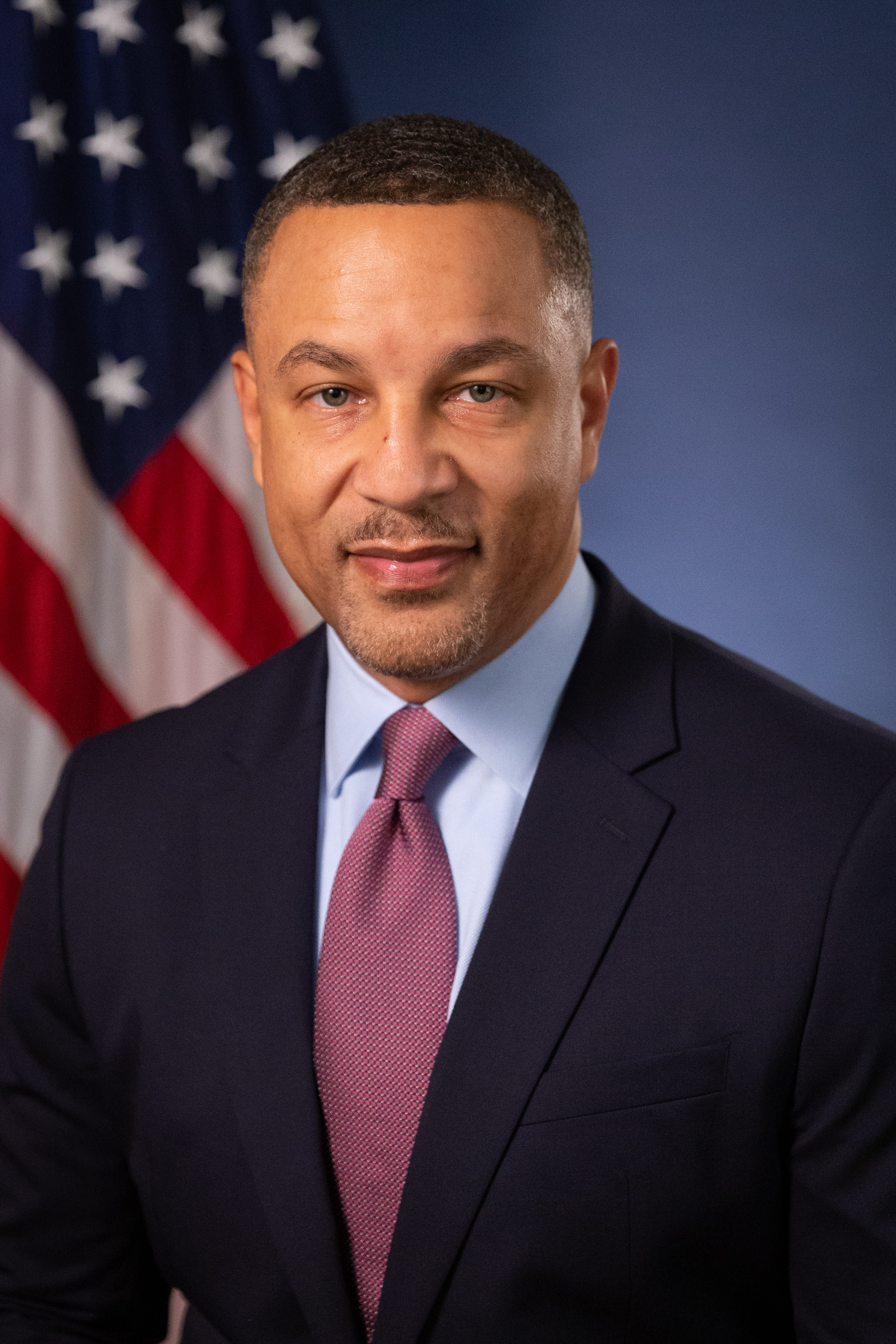

United States Attorney for the Eastern District of New York
- In office October 15, 2021 – January 10, 2025
- Appointed by: Joe Biden
- Preceded by: Robert L. Capers
- Succeeded by: Carolyn Pokorny (acting)

Personal details
- Born: 1971 (age 54–55) Philadelphia, Pennsylvania, U.S.
- Education: University of California, Berkeley (BA); New York University (JD)

Breon Stacey Peace (born 1971) is an American lawyer who served as the United States attorney for the Eastern District of New York from October 2021 to January 2025.

== Education ==
Peace received his Bachelor of Arts from the University of California, Berkeley, in 1993 and his Juris Doctor from the New York University School of Law in 1996.

== Legal career ==
Peace served as a law clerk for Judge Sterling Johnson Jr. of the United States District Court for the Eastern District of New York from 1997 to 1998. He was a partner at Cleary Gottlieb Steen & Hamilton in New York City from 2007 to 2022, and previously worked as an associate at the firm from 1996 to 1997, 1998 to 1999, and 2003 to 2007. He was an acting assistant professor of clinical law at New York University School of Law from 2002 to 2003. He previously served as an Assistant United States Attorney in the United States Attorney's Office for the Eastern District of New York from 2000 to 2002.

=== U.S. Attorney for Eastern District of New York ===
In March 2021, Senator Chuck Schumer recommended Peace to serve as the United States Attorney for the Eastern District of New York. On August 10, 2021, President Joe Biden nominated Peace as the United States attorney for the Eastern District of New York. On September 30, 2021, his nomination was reported out of committee by voice vote. On October 5, 2021, the United States Senate confirmed his nomination by a voice vote. On October 15, 2021, he was sworn in as United States Attorney for the Eastern District of New York by United States Chief District Judge Margo Kitsy Brodie. He resigned from office on January 10, 2025.

As U.S. Attorney for the Eastern District of New York, Peace prosecuted Douglass Mackey for conspiring to interfere in the 2016 elections by encouraging Twitter users who supported Hillary Clinton to vote via text message. This conviction was resoundingly overturned by the United States Court of Appeals for the Second Circuit, who stated no “rational trier of fact could have found the essential elements of the crime beyond a reasonable doubt.”

Legal offices
Preceded by Robert L. Capers; Jacquelyn M. Kasulis; Acting	United States Attorney for the Eastern District of New York; 2021–2025	Succeeded by Carolyn Pokorny; Acting
