= Asa Wentworth Tenney =

American judge

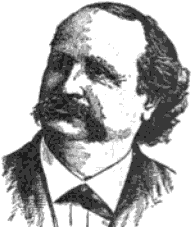

Judge of the United States District Court for the Eastern District of New York
- In office July 8, 1897 – December 10, 1897
- Appointed by: William McKinley
- Preceded by: Charles L. Benedict
- Succeeded by: Edward B. Thomas

Personal details
- Born: Asa Wentworth Tenney; May 20, 1833 Dalton, New Hampshire
- Died: December 10, 1897 (aged 64) Brooklyn, New York
- Resting place: Green-Wood Cemetery
- Education: Dartmouth College read law

Asa Wentworth Tenney (May 20, 1833 – December 10, 1897) was a United States district judge of the United States District Court for the Eastern District of New York.

== Education and career ==
Born in Dalton, New Hampshire, Tenney graduated from Dartmouth College in 1859 and read law to enter the bar in 1863. He was in private practice in Brooklyn and New York City, New York from 1863 to 1897. He was United States Attorney for the Eastern District of New York from 1877 to 1885.

== Federal judicial service ==
On July 2, 1897, Tenney was nominated by President William McKinley to a seat on the United States District Court for the Eastern District of New York vacated by Judge Charles L. Benedict. Tenney was confirmed by the United States Senate on July 8, 1897, and received his commission the same day. He served until his death in Brooklyn on December 10, 1897. He was buried at Green-Wood Cemetery.

Legal offices
Preceded by Benjamin F. Tracy	United States Attorney for the Eastern District of New York; 1877–1885	Succeeded by Mark D. Wilber
Preceded by Charles L. Benedict	Judge of the United States District Court for the Eastern District of New York; 1897	Succeeded by Edward B. Thomas
