= Benton J. Campbell =

American lawyer

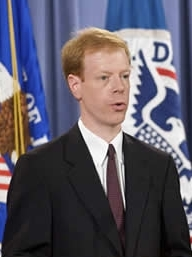
- Campbell speaks at Department of Justice in 2009

U.S. Attorney for the Eastern District of New York
- In office 2007–2010
- Appointed by: Attorney General
- Preceded by: Roslynn R. Mauskopf
- Succeeded by: Loretta Lynch

Benton J. Campbell is an American lawyer. He was interim United States Attorney for the Eastern District of New York from 2007 to 2010, and, was a partner at Latham & Watkins, a New York City law firm. He is now General Counsel of Deloitte.

Campbell was raised in Iowa. He did his undergraduate studies at Yale University and then attended the University of Chicago Law School. His nickname was "dangerous Opie".
