= Ray B. Smith =

American lawyer and politician

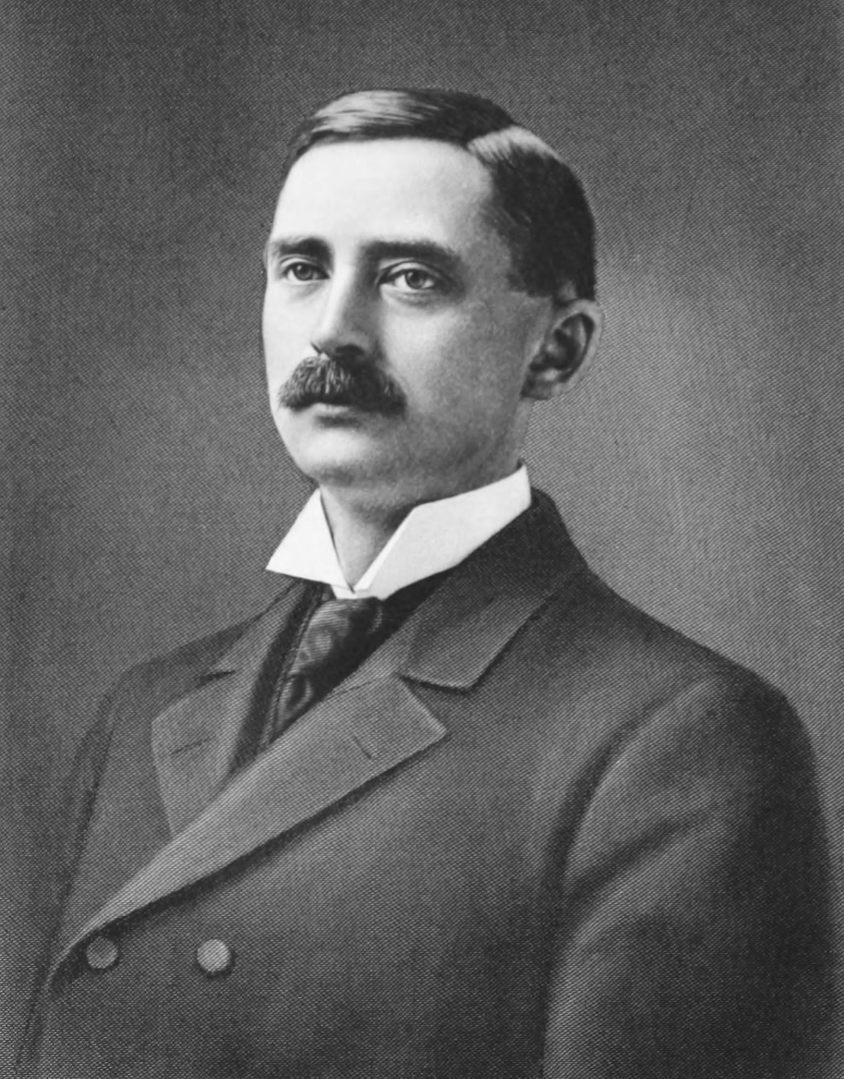
- Born: Ray Burdick Smith; December 7, 1867; Cuyler, New York, United States
- Died: December 28, 1939 (aged 72); Philadelphia, Pennsylvania, United States
- Burial place: Oakwood Cemetery
- Education: Yale University; Cornell Law School
- Occupations: Lawyer, politician
- Spouse: Nellie King Reilay (m. 1891)
- Children: 1

Signature
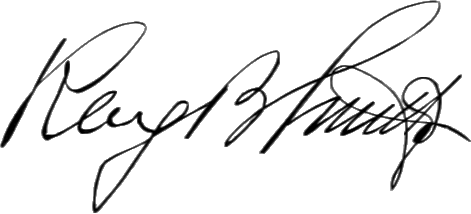

Ray Burdick Smith (December 7, 1867 – December 28, 1939) was an American lawyer and politician from New York.

== Early life ==
Smith was born on December 7, 1867, in Cuyler, New York. He was the son of farmer Willis Smith and Emily Burdick.

When he was a child, Smith moved with his parents to Lincklean. He attended DeRuyter Academy and Cazenovia Seminary, graduating from the latter in 1886. He then attended Syracuse University for a year, after which he attended Yale University. While in Yale, he edited the Yale Literary Magazine and won the John Addison Porter Prize. He was also a member of Phi Beta Kappa, Psi Upsilon, and Chi Delta Theta. He graduated with distinction, and a degree in Bachelor of Arts, in 1891.

After graduating from Yale, Smith attended Cornell Law School, where one of his professors was future New York governor and Supreme Court Chief Justice Charles Evans Hughes. He then moved to Syracuse, where he finished his law studies and passed the bar in 1893.

== Career ==
He quickly started the law firm Woods & Smith, later called Thomson, Woods & Smith. He later headed the law firm Smith, Heyden & Setright. He also served as president of several corporations, including the First Mortgage Bond Corporation, Syracuse Press, Inc., Selina Paper Company, and Excelsior Insurance Company of New York.

Smith was appointed a clerk for the 1894 New York State Constitutional Convention. He was Clerk of the Committee on General Laws in the New York State Senate in 1894 and 1895. He served as town supervisor of the Syracuse 14th ward from 1896 to 1900. He was appointed Assistant Clerk of the New York State Assembly in 1898, 1899, 1900, 1901, 1902, 1903, 1904, 1905, 1906, and 1907. He was elected Clerk of the New York State Assembly by the Assembly in 1908, 1909, and 1910. He was a delegate to the 1915 New York State Constitutional Convention. He was the vice-chairman and chairman of the Onondoga County Republican Committee, and from 1906 to 1907 he served as assistant secretary of the New York State Republican Committee.

In 1922, he worked with Willis Fletcher Johnson to publish the Political and Governmental History of the State of New York, a six-volume history on the politics and political parties of New York from George Clinton to 1922.

Smith belonged to the Onondaga County Bar Association and the New York State Bar Association.

== Personal life ==
Smith married Nellie King Reilay in 1891. They had a son, Willis King.

Smith was a Mason and a Shriner. He was a member of the Benevolent and Protective Order of Elks, the Improved Order of Red Men, and the Independent Order of Foresters.

Smith died in his son's home in Philadelphia on December 28, 1939. He was buried in Oakwood Cemetery in Syracuse.

Government offices
Preceded by Archie E. Baxter	Clerk of the New York State Assembly; 1908-1910	Succeeded by Luke McHenry
