= Benjamin D. Silliman =

American politician (1805–1901)

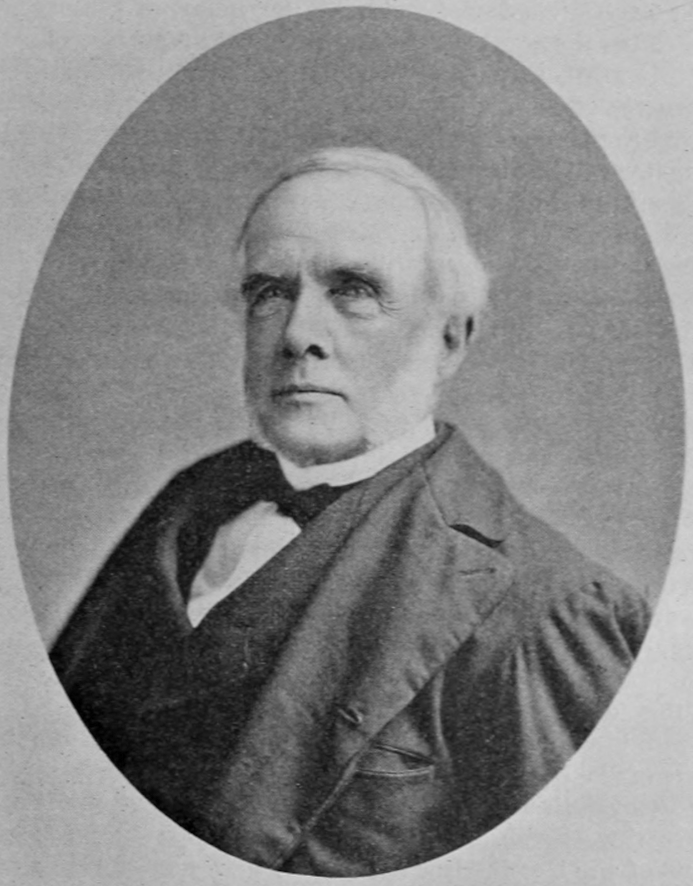

United States Attorney for the Eastern District of New York
- In office 1865–1866

Member of the New York State Assembly
- In office 1838

Personal details
- Born: Benjamin Douglas Silliman; September 14, 1805 Newport, Rhode Island
- Died: January 24, 1901 (aged 95) Brooklyn, New York
- Resting place: Green-Wood Cemetery
- Party: Whig; Republican
- Education: Yale College
- Occupation: Lawyer, politician

Benjamin Douglas Silliman (September 14, 1805 – January 24, 1901) was an American lawyer and politician from New York.

== Life ==
Silliman was born on September 14, 1805, in Newport, Rhode Island, son of Gold Selleck Silliman and Hepsa Ely. His paternal grandfather was General Gold Selleck Silliman, the King's Attorney for Fairfield County and a participant of the American Revolution. His paternal great-grandfather was Judge Ebenezer Silliman, who was Speaker of the Connecticut House for seven years, a member the Connecticut Council for 28 years, and a judge of the Connecticut Superior Court for 23 years. A maternal great-great-grandfather was Reverend Joseph Fish, a descendant of Mayflower passengers John Alden and Priscilla Mullins. When he was 10, the family moved to Greenwich Village in New York City. The ground the Silliman home stood later became home to the Jefferson Market Courthouse.

Silliman attended Yale College. His father, both grandfathers, and great-grandfather all attended Yale as well. He graduated with a B.A. in 1824 and received an M.A. in 1827. He studied law in Yale in 1824 and 1825. His graduating class included Connecticut Chief Justice Origen S. Seymour, New York Attorney General Willis Hall, New York Secretary of State Elias W. Leavenworth, and Richard F. Cleveland, father of future U.S. President Grover Cleveland. By the time he died, he was the last surviving member of his Yale class and Yale's oldest living graduate. After graduating, he spent a year working in Yale as Assistant in Chemistry under his uncle, Professor Benjamin Silliman.

Silliman then studied law in the law office of Chancellor James Kent and his son William Kent. He was admitted to the bar in 1829 and began practicing law in New York City and in Brooklyn, where he lived. With some interruptions for public service, he practiced law for 71 years. For over half a century he served as counsel of the Union Ferry Company, the National Bank of Commerce of Brooklyn, and Green-Wood Cemetery. He received an honorary LL.D. from Columbia University in 1873 and from Yale University in 1874. At the time of his death, he was the oldest practicing lawyer in the state of New York.

In 1837, Silliman was elected to the New York State Assembly as a Whig. He served in the Assembly in 1838 as one of two representatives of Kings County. He was a delegate to the 1839 Whig National Convention. In the 1842 United States House of Representatives election, he was the Whig candidate for New York's 2nd congressional district, but he lost to Henry C. Murphy of the Democratic Party. In 1865, he was appointed the first United States Attorney for the Eastern District of New York. He resigned in 1866 due to the position interfering with his private practice. He was a delegate to the 1872 Republican National Convention. In 1872, he was appointed to the New York Constitutional Commission of 1872-1873. In the 1873 New York state election, he was the Republican candidate for Attorney General of New York. He lost this election to Democrat Daniel Pratt.

Silliman never married. He was a founder of the Union Club and the Long Island Historical Society, president of the Yale Alumni Association, a director of Green-Wood Cemetery (which he helped incorporate while in the Assembly), president of the Brooklyn Club, first president of the New England Society of Brooklyn, a manager of the New York House of Refuge, and a vice-president and co-founder of the New York City Bar Association.

Silliman died at home of bronchial pneumonia on January 24, 1901. He was buried in Green-Wood Cemetery.

Legal offices
Preceded by Office Established	U.S. Attorney for the Eastern District of New York; 1865–1866	Succeeded by Benjamin F. Tracy
