= Zachary W. Carter =

American lawyer (born 1950)

Zachary Carter

78th Corporation Counsel of New York City
- In office January 1, 2014 – August 31, 2019
- Mayor: Bill de Blasio
- Preceded by: Michael A. Cardozo
- Succeeded by: Georgia Pestana (acting)

United States Attorney for the Eastern District of New York
- In office 1993–1999
- President: Bill Clinton
- Preceded by: Mary Jo White (acting)
- Succeeded by: Loretta Lynch

Personal details
- Born: March 19, 1950 (age 76)
- Party: Democratic
- Education: Cornell University (BA); New York University (JD)

Zachary W. Carter (born March 19, 1950) is an American lawyer who served as Corporation Counsel of New York City under Mayor Bill de Blasio and United States Attorney for the Eastern District of New York under President Bill Clinton. His term as U.S. Attorney was notable for the prosecutions of the police officers in the Abner Louima case, Jordan Belfort, and those involved in the death of Yankel Rosenbaum during the Crown Heights riot of 1991. Between his tenures in government service, Carter was a partner at Dorsey & Whitney.

Carter graduated from Cornell University in 1972, where he participated in the 1969 takeover of Willard Straight Hall, resulting in charges of criminal trespass that were later dismissed. Carter was admitted to the New York Bar and eventually became a judge of the New York City Criminal Court.

Legal offices
Preceded by Mary Jo White; Acting	United States Attorney for the Eastern District of New York; 1993–1999	Succeeded by Loretta Lynch
Government offices
Preceded by Michael A. Cardozo	Corporation Counsel of New York City; 2014–2019	Succeeded by Georgia Pestana; Acting
