= Office of the MTA Inspector General =

New York State government agency

Office of the Metropolitan Transportation Authority Inspector General
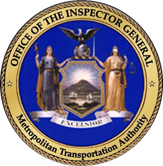

Agency overview
- Formed: 1983; 43 years ago
- Jurisdiction: Metropolitan Transportation Authority
- Headquarters: One Penn Plaza, Manhattan; 40°45′5″N 73°59′35″W
- Agency executive: Daniel Cort, Inspector General
- Parent Public benefit corporation: Metropolitan Transportation Authority
- Key document: New York State Public Authorities Law §1279
- Website: mtaig.ny.gov

The Office of the Metropolitan Transportation Authority Inspector General (OIG) is the Office of Inspector General specific to the Metropolitan Transportation Authority (MTA) that is responsible for conducting monitoring and oversight of MTA activities, programs, and employees.

OIG provides oversight and monitors the activities of the MTA in order to ensure a safe, reliable, clean, and affordable public transportation system in the New York metropolitan area. Through its investigations, audits, legal work, and other studies, the OIG works to help the MTA improve its performance and to enhance the quality, efficiency, effectiveness, and safety of its agencies' operations and substantiate allegations of waste, fraud, and abuse.

== Organization ==
=== Audits ===
The OIG Audit Division conducts in-depth audits and reviews of a wide variety of policy initiatives, program operations, and service-related activities of MTA agencies. OIG audits assess whether MTA operations are safe, accessible, and efficient, and make recommendations for improvement as appropriate. The OIG Audit Division regularly consults with the MTA Auditor General and other audit and investigative units throughout federal, state, and local New York government.

=== Legal & Investigations ===
The OIG Investigations Division receives and investigates complaints from within and outside the MTA concerning alleged fraud and other criminality, waste, and abuse. The division's priorities are the detection and deterrence of fraud, the protection of MTA assets, and assuring the safety of MTA ridership. Where appropriate, matters are referred to relevant law enforcement and other governmental officials on the federal, state, and local levels for further investigation and/or for criminal or civil prosecution, in which OIG routinely participates.

== Tips & Complaints ==
Like all Offices of Inspector General, MTA OIG audits and investigations are frequently generated from tips and complaints received from various sources including MTA riders, workers, and third parties. In 2019, the OIG received the largest amount of complaints in the office's history.

== History ==
In 1983, the New York State Legislature established the Office of the MTA Inspector General through Public Authorities Law 1279. The MTA Inspector General is nominated by the New York State Governor and must be confirmed by the New York State Senate.

The agency's creation was requested by then-Governor Mario Cuomo. The first MTA Inspector General was Sidney Schwartz. In 2019, Carolyn Pokorny became the first female MTA Inspector General.

=== List of MTA Inspectors General ===
MTA Inspectors General
MTA Inspector General	Tenure	Nominated By
Sidney Schwartz	1983 - 1985	Mario Cuomo
Sanford E. Russell	1985 - 1988	Mario Cuomo
John S. Pritchard III	1988 - 1992	Mario Cuomo
Henry B. Flinter	1993 - 1995	George Pataki
Roland M. Malan	1995 - 2000	George Pataki
Matthew D. Sansverie	2000 - 2006	George Pataki
Barry Kluger	2007 - 2019	Eliot Spitzer
Carolyn Pokorny	2019 - 2021	Andrew Cuomo
Elizabeth Keating	2022 - 2023	Acting Inspector General
Daniel G. Cort	2023 - Present	Kathy Hochul

== Statutory Authority ==
Public Authorities Law (PAL) §1279 authorizes and directs the MTA Inspector General to independently review the operations of the MTA and its constituent agencies: New York City Transit Authority, Long Island Rail Road, Metro-North Railroad, MTA Bridges and Tunnels, MTA Bus, and MTA Capital Construction.

In terms of the scope of its statutory authority to perform this review, the OIG has “full and unrestricted access” to all “records, information, data, reports, plans, projections, contracts, memoranda, correspondence and any others materials” of the MTA (PAL §1279[3]).

The Inspector General also has the following statutory functions, powers, and duties (PAL §1279[4]):

- Receive and investigate complaints from any source or upon his own initiative concerning alleged abuses, frauds, and service deficiencies, relating to the MTA.
- Initiate such reviews as he deems appropriate of the operations of the MTA to identify areas in which performance might be improved and available funds used more effectively.
- Recommend remedial action to be taken by the MTA to overcome or correct operating or maintenance deficiencies or inefficiencies that he determines to exist.
- Make available to appropriate law enforcement officials information and evidence relating to criminal acts that he obtains in the course of his duties.
- Subpoena witnesses, administer oaths and affirmations, take testimony and compel production of books, papers, records, and documents as he deems relevant to any inquiry or investigation pursuant to PAL §1279.
- Monitor implementation by the MTA of recommendations made by the Inspector General or other audit agencies.
- Do “all things necessary” to carry out the above functions, powers, and duties.

The Inspector General, who is an ex officio member of the New York State Public Transportation Safety Board (PTSB) with authority to vote on matters involving the operations of the MTA (as per Transportation Law §216[1]), is further authorized and directed to cooperate, consult, and coordinate with PTSB regarding any activity concerning the operation of the MTA.3 With respect to any accident on the facilities of the MTA, the primary responsibility for investigation belongs to PTSB, which is required to share its findings with the Inspector General (PAL §1279[5]).

The OIG is required to make annual public reports to the governor and members of the legislature (PAL §1279[6]).

The Inspector General may request from any office or agency of the State of New York or any of its political subdivisions, such cooperation, assistance, services, and data as will enable him to carry out his functions, powers, and duties, and they are authorized and directed to comply (PAL §1279[7]).
