= 109th New York Infantry Regiment =

- Active: August 27, 1862, to June 4, 1865
- Country: United States
- Allegiance: Union
- Branch: Infantry
- Engagements: Battle of the Wilderness; Battle of Spotsylvania Courthouse; Battle of North Anna; Battle of Totopotomoy Creek; Battle of Cold Harbor; Siege of Petersburg; Second Battle of Petersburg; Battle of the Crater; Battle of Poplar Springs Church & Peebles's Farm; Battle of Boydton Plank Road

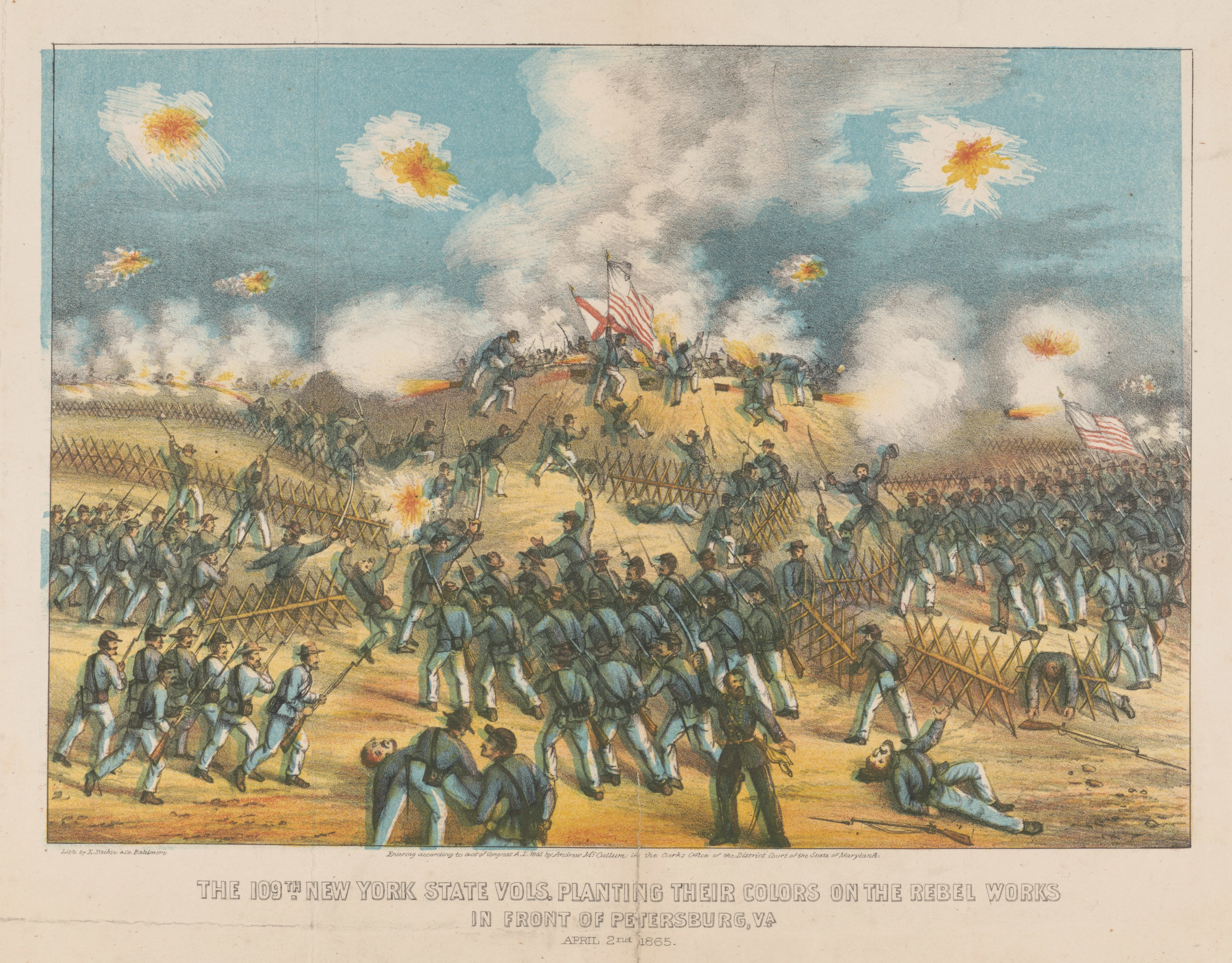
The 109th volunteers planting their colors on the rebel works in front of Petersburg, Va., April 2, 1865

The 109th New York Infantry Regiment was an infantry regiment that served in the Union Army during the American Civil War. The 109th New York was raised in and around Binghamton, New York. It was also known as the Binghamton Regiment and the Railway Brigade.

== Service ==
The regiment was organized in and around Binghamton, New York, and was mustered in for a three-year enlistment on August 27, 1862. It left New York on August 30, 1862, to serve as a guard to the Washington, D.C. railroads in Annapolis Junction, and Laurel, Maryland. On May 4, 1864, the 109th New York served in Virginia. They fought in the Overland Campaign leading up to the Siege of Petersburg, including the battles of The Wilderness, Spotsylvania Courthouse, and Cold Harbor.

The regiment was mustered out of service on June 4, 1865, at the Delaney House in Washington, D.C.

== Total strength and casualties ==
The regiment suffered 5 officers and 160 enlisted men who were killed in action or mortally wounded and 164 enlisted men who died of disease, for a total of 329 fatalities.

== Commanders ==
- Colonel Benjamin Tracy
- Temporarily Captain Edwin Evans
- Colonel Isaac Catlin

== See also ==
- List of New York Civil War regiments
- New York in the American Civil War
