= John Oakey =

American lawyer and politician

John Oakey (September 12, 1829 – March 24, 1898) was an American lawyer and politician from New York.

== Life ==
Oakey was born on September 12, 1829, in Brooklyn, New York. His father was a lineal descendant of Cromwell officer John Okey, while his mother was a descendant of Hartford founder Thomas Hooker. He moved to Flatbush with his family when he was eight.

Oakey studied at Erasmus Hall Academy. He entered Yale College in 1845, graduating from there with honors in 1849. After a preliminary study session, he entered the law office of James Humphrey. He was admitted to the bar in 1851. He then spent two years working as managing clerk for Charles T. Cromwell of New York City. In 1854, he began practicing law in New York City with Cromwell in the law firm Cromwell & Oakey, later known as Blanke, Oakey & Cromwell. In 1858, he started practicing with Hiram P. Hunt in the law firm Hunt & Oakey. He was also first elected justice of the peace for Kings County that year. In 1865, he was appointed Commissioner of Excise for Kings County. He was also a school trustee and trustee of Erasmus Hall Academy.

During the American Civil War, Oakey served as a private with the 7th Regiment of the New York National Guard. He served for three months in 1861 at Washington D.C., another three months in 1862 at Federal Hill, Baltimore, and another three months in 1863 at Federal Hill, Frederick, and Monocacy. He was also with the regiment during the New York City draft riots. He was later promoted to judge advocate, with the rank of colonel, on the staff of Major-General Alexander Shaler of the First Division of the New York National Guard.

In 1865, Oakey was elected to the New York State Assembly as a Republican, representing the Kings County 1st District. He served in the Assembly in 1866 and 1867. In 1871, he moved from Flatbush to Brooklyn. In 1872, he briefly worked as a U.S. Assessor. In 1874, he was counsel for the Brooklyn Police Excise departments. He served as assistant district attorney under Isaac S. Catlin from 1878 to 1884. In 1889, he was appointed Assistant United States District Attorney for the Eastern District of New York. He was promoted to District Attorney in 1894, but he resigned a few months later and resumed his law practice. When he died, he was U.S. Commissioner for the Eastern District of New York.

In 1857, Oakey married Sarah Spofford of Flatbush. She died in 1862, with no surviving children. He then married Dr. Frances Wallach, with whom he had a daughter, Frances. He was a member of the Lincoln Club, the Grand Army of the Republic, the Society of Old Brooklynites, and the Atlantic Yacht Club. He was a founder of the Entre Nous, the Amaranth, the Social Literary Union, and the Athenian Society. He was Episcopalian.

Oakey died at home from gastric apoplexy on March 24, 1898. He was buried in Green-Wood Cemetery.

New York State Assembly
| Preceded by Jarvis Whitman | New York State Assembly; Kings County, 1st District; 1866 | Succeeded by Patrick Burns |
| Preceded by District Created | New York State Assembly; Kings County, 8th District; 1867 | Succeeded by DeWitt C. Tower |
