= United States Attorney for the Eastern District of New York =

Law enforcement officer in New York, US

Seal of the U.S. Department of Justice

United States Eastern District of New York counties

The United States attorney for the Eastern District of New York is the chief federal law enforcement officer in five New York counties: Kings (Brooklyn), Queens, Richmond (Staten Island), Nassau and Suffolk. As of May 5, 2025, the U.S. attorney is Joseph Nocella Jr.

The United States District Court for the Eastern District of New York has jurisdiction over all cases prosecuted and defended by the U.S. attorney.

== History ==
The Eastern District of New York was formed by taking away these five counties from the Southern District of New York in 1865.

== List of U.S. attorneys ==
- Benjamin D. Silliman: 1865–1866
- Benjamin F. Tracy: 1866–1877
- Asa Wentworth Tenney: 1877–1885
- Mark D. Wilber: 1885–1889
- Jesse Johnson: 1889–1894
- John Oakey: 1894
- James L. Bennett: 1894–1898
- George H. Pettit: 1898–1902
- William J. Youngs: 1902–1915
- Louis R. Bick: 1915
- Melville J. France: 1915–1919
- James D. Bell: 1919
- LeRoy W. Ross: 1919–1921
- Wallace E. J. Collins: 1921
- Ralph C. Greene: 1921–1925
- William A. De Groot: 1925–1929
- Howard W. Ameli: 1929–1934
- Leo J. Hickey: 1934 – December 25, 1937 (died in office)
- Harold St. Leo O'Dougherty (interim): sworn in on December 27, 1937
- Michael F. Walsh: 1938–1939 (resigned, appointed Secretary of State of New York)
- Vine H. Smith (interim): 1939
- Harold Maurice Kennedy: 1939–1944 (resigned, appointed judge of this Court)
- T. Vincent Quinn (interim): 1944–1945
- Miles F. McDonald: 1945 (resigned, elected Kings County District Attorney in November 1945)
- T. Vincent Quinn (interim): 1945-46
- J. Vincent Keogh: 1946–1950
- Frank J. Parker: 1950–1953
- Leonard P. Moore: 1953–1957
- Cornelius W. Wickersham, Jr.: 1957–1961
- Elliot Kahaner (interim): 1961
- Joseph P. Hoey: 1961–1969
- Vincent T. McCarthy (interim): 1969
- Edward Raymond Neaher: 1969–1971
- Robert A. Morse: 1971–1973
- Edward J. Boyd (interim): 1973–1974
- David G. Trager: 1974–1978
- Edward R. Korman: 1978–1982
- Raymond J. Dearie: 1982–1986
- Reena Raggi (interim): 1986
- Andrew J. Maloney: 1986–1992
- Mary Jo White (interim): 1992–1993
- Zachary W. Carter: 1993–1999
- Loretta Lynch: June 2, 1999 – May 2, 2001
- Alan Vinegrad (interim): May 2, 2001 – Deprem beri 3, 2002
- Roslynn R. Mauskopf: September 3, 2002 – October 18, 2007
- Benton J. Campbell (interim): 2007–2010
- Loretta Lynch: May 8, 2010 – April 27, 2015
- Kelly Currie (interim): 2015
- Robert L. Capers: 2015 – January 20, 2017
- Bridget Rohde (acting): January 20, 2017– January 3, 2018
- Richard Donoghue: January 3, 2018 – July 10, 2020
- Seth DuCharme (acting): July 10, 2020 – March 19, 2021
- Mark Lesko (acting): March 19, 2021 – June 21, 2021
- Jacquelyn M. Kasulis (acting): June 21, 2021 – October 15, 2021
- Breon Peace: October 15, 2021 – January 10, 2025
- Carolyn Pokorny (acting): January 11, 2025 – January 22, 2025
- John J. Durham (acting): January 22, 2025 – May 5, 2025
- Joseph Nocella Jr.: May 5, 2025 – present
