= Loretta Lynch =

American attorney (born 1959)

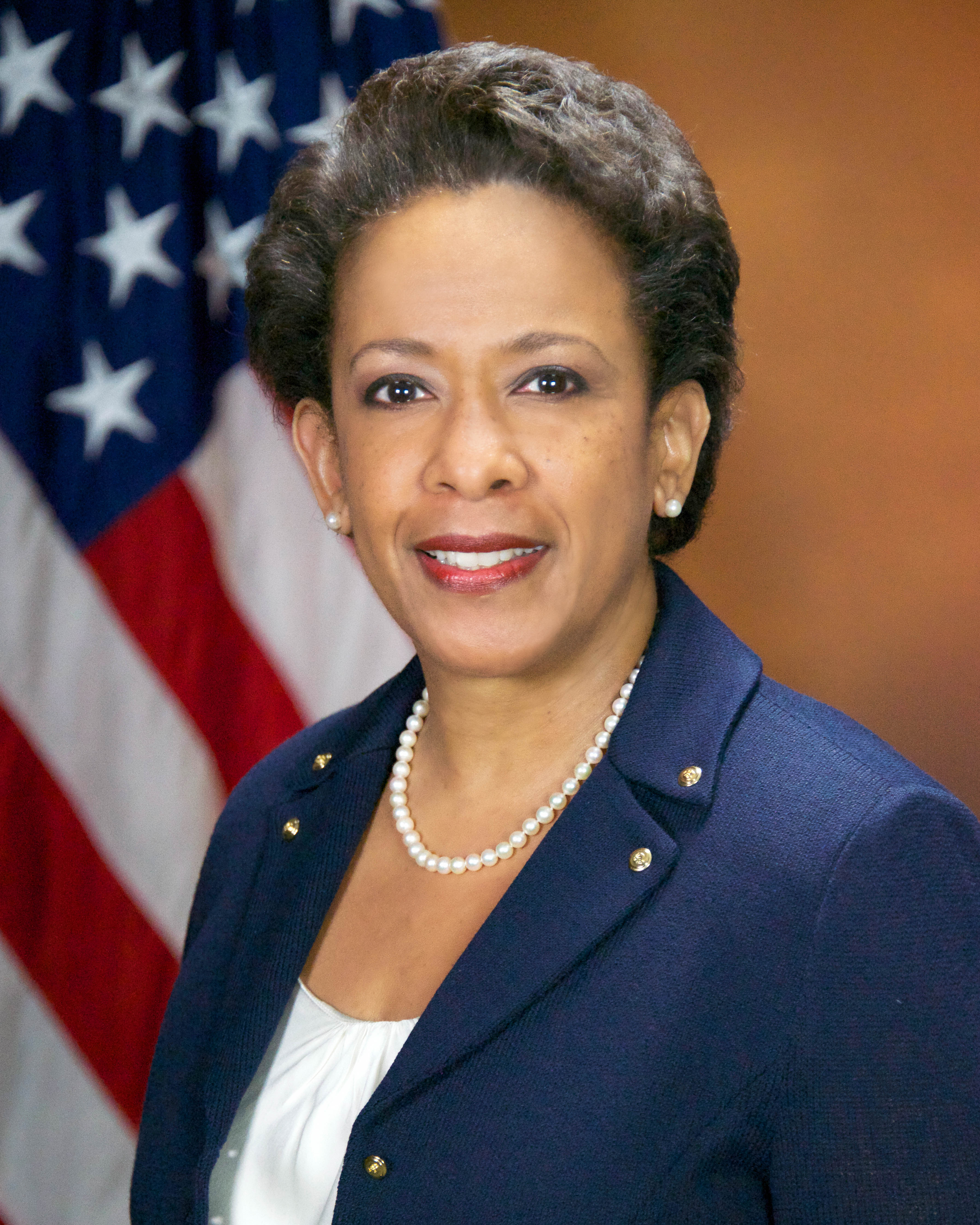
- Official portrait, 2015

83rd United States Attorney General
- In office April 27, 2015 – January 20, 2017
- President: Barack Obama
- Deputy: Sally Yates
- Preceded by: Eric Holder
- Succeeded by: Jeff Sessions

United States Attorney for the Eastern District of New York
- In office May 8, 2010 – April 27, 2015
- President: Barack Obama
- Preceded by: Benton J. Campbell
- Succeeded by: Robert Capers
- In office June 2, 1999 – May 2, 2001
- President: Bill Clinton; George W. Bush
- Preceded by: Zachary W. Carter
- Succeeded by: Roslynn R. Mauskopf

Personal details
- Born: Loretta Elizabeth Lynch; May 21, 1959 (age 67) Greensboro, North Carolina, U.S.
- Party: Democratic
- Spouse: Stephen Hargrove (m. 2007)
- Education: Harvard University (BA, JD)
- Lynch's voice Lynch on criminal justice reform. Recorded November 30, 2016

Loretta Elizabeth Lynch (born May 21, 1959) is an American attorney who served as the 83rd attorney general of the United States from 2015 to 2017. She was appointed by President Barack Obama to succeed Eric Holder and previously served as the United States attorney for the Eastern District of New York from 1999 to 2001 and again from 2010 to 2015. As a U.S. attorney, Lynch oversaw federal prosecutions in Brooklyn, Queens, Staten Island, and Long Island.

Lynch is a Harvard Law School graduate. She then practiced law in New York and became a federal prosecutor in 1990, rising to become head of the Eastern District office. She later returned to private law practice until she became the top district prosecutor again. From 2003 to 2005, she served on the Federal Reserve Bank of New York board.

In November 2014, President Barack Obama nominated her to succeed Eric Holder as Attorney General. In February 2015, the Judiciary Committee of the United States Senate recommended her confirmation by a 12–8 vote, with all Democrats of the committee and three Republicans in favor. In April 2015, Lynch was confirmed by the Senate by a 56–43 vote, making her the first African-American woman to be confirmed for the position. She was sworn in as Attorney General in April 2015. Her tenure ended in January 2017. In May 2019, law firm Paul, Weiss announced that Lynch would be joining the firm as a partner in the litigation department.

== Early life and education ==
Lynch was born in Greensboro, North Carolina. Both her mother, Lorine Lynch, a school librarian, and her father, Lorenzo Lynch, a Baptist minister, were graduates of Shaw University. As a child, she spent hours with her father, watching court proceedings in the courthouse of Durham, North Carolina. Her early interest in court proceedings was inspired by hearing stories about her grandfather, a sharecropper and pastor, who in the 1930s had helped people move to the north to escape racial persecution under the Jim Crow laws of the time. She attended the Governor's School of North Carolina, a prestigious summer program for academically and intellectually gifted high school students. Lynch earned a Bachelor of Arts in English and American literature from Harvard College in 1981 and a Juris Doctor from Harvard Law School in 1984, where she was a member of the Harvard Legal Aid Bureau. She is a member of Delta Sigma Theta sorority, and was a charter member of the Xi Tau chapter of the sorority while at Harvard. In 2017, Lynch was awarded an honorary degree from Duke University.

== Career ==
Lynch's first job in the legal field was working as a litigation associate for Cahill Gordon & Reindel in New York City. She joined the U.S. Attorney's office for the Eastern District of New York as a drug and violent-crime prosecutor in 1990. From 1994 to 1998, she served as the chief of the Long Island office and worked on several political corruption cases involving the government of Brookhaven, New York. From 1998 to 1999, she was the chief assistant U.S. Attorney in the Eastern District and headed the Brooklyn office.

In 1999, she was nominated by President Bill Clinton to serve as the U.S. Attorney for the Eastern District of New York. During her term as U.S. Attorney, Lynch oversaw prosecution of New York City police officers in the Abner Louima case.

In 2001, Lynch left the U.S. Attorney's office to become a partner at Hogan & Hartson (later Hogan Lovells). She remained there until January 20, 2010, when President Barack Obama nominated Lynch to again serve as United States attorney for the Eastern District of New York. From 2003 to 2005, she was a member of the board of the Federal Reserve Bank of New York.

Following the July 2014 death of Eric Garner, an unarmed man who died after being held in a department-prohibited chokehold by a New York City police officer, Lynch agreed to meet with Garner's family to discuss possible federal prosecution of the officer believed to be responsible for Garner's death.

Lynch's office prosecuted Republican congressman Michael Grimm; prosecuted Democratic politicians Pedro Espada Jr. and William Boyland, Jr.; investigated Citigroup over mortgage securities sold by the bank, resulting in a US$7 billion settlement; and was involved in the US$1.2 billion settlement with HSBC over violations of the Bank Secrecy Act.

While Lynch was U.S. attorney for the Eastern District of New York, she supervised the investigation into senior FIFA officials from its earliest stages. The investigation culminated in the indictment of 14 senior FIFA officials and sports marketing executives shortly after Lynch was confirmed as Attorney General. For her work in the case, which eventually led to the resignation of FIFA President Sepp Blatter, Lynch was presented with the 3rd annual Golden Blazer by NBC Sports' Men in Blazers (Roger Bennett and Michael Davies). (The other winners so far include ESPN's Bob Ley, NBC's Rebecca Lowe, FOX's Rob Stone and former US women's national team captains and FIFA Women's World Cup winners Julie Foudy and Megan Rapinoe.) Later on, Lynch joined the law firm that represented FIFA in the corruption case she worked on in her previous position.

Replacing Lynch, Robert Capers was confirmed by the U.S. Senate as U.S. Attorney for the Eastern District of New York on December 15, 2015, taking his oath of office on January 4, 2016.

In May 2019, Lynch returned to the private sector and moved to Paul, Weiss, Rifkind, Wharton & Garrison. She became a partner in the firm's litigation department, where she represents individuals, companies, and corporate boards of directors in high-stakes cases, regulatory matters, and investigations.

In December 2020, Lynch was hired by the National Football League to help investigate allegations of misconduct among the owners of the Washington Football Team, one of the league's member clubs.

In October 2024, Lynch represented Chinese drone manufacturer DJI in a lawsuit against the U.S. Department of Defense in an attempt to have the company removed from a list of designated "Chinese military companies", designed to counter the Chinese government's military-civil fusion strategy.

== Attorney General of the United States (2015–2017) ==
=== Nomination and confirmation ===
On November 8, 2014, President Barack Obama nominated Lynch for the position of U.S. attorney general, to succeed Eric Holder, who had previously announced his resignation, pending confirmation of his replacement. She was confirmed by the Senate Judiciary Committee on February 26, 2015, and approved by the Senate in a 56–43 vote on April 23, thereby becoming the first African-American woman, the second African-American after Holder, and the second woman, after Janet Reno, to hold this office.

Several Republicans on the Senate Judiciary Committee including chairman Chuck Grassley, opposed Lynch's confirmation, saying it was important to find out more about Lynch's role in settling a $1.9 billion money-laundering deal with HSBC when she served as United States attorney in New York. Rand Paul, though not on the committee, opposed her nomination for her support of civil forfeiture. On April 23, 2015, cloture was invoked on her nomination by a vote of 66 to 34. Her appointment was confirmed the same day by a 56 to 43 vote. Her nomination process was one of the longest in the history of the United States, taking 166 days after she was first nominated for the post. She was sworn in by Vice President Joe Biden on April 27, 2015.

=== Tenure ===
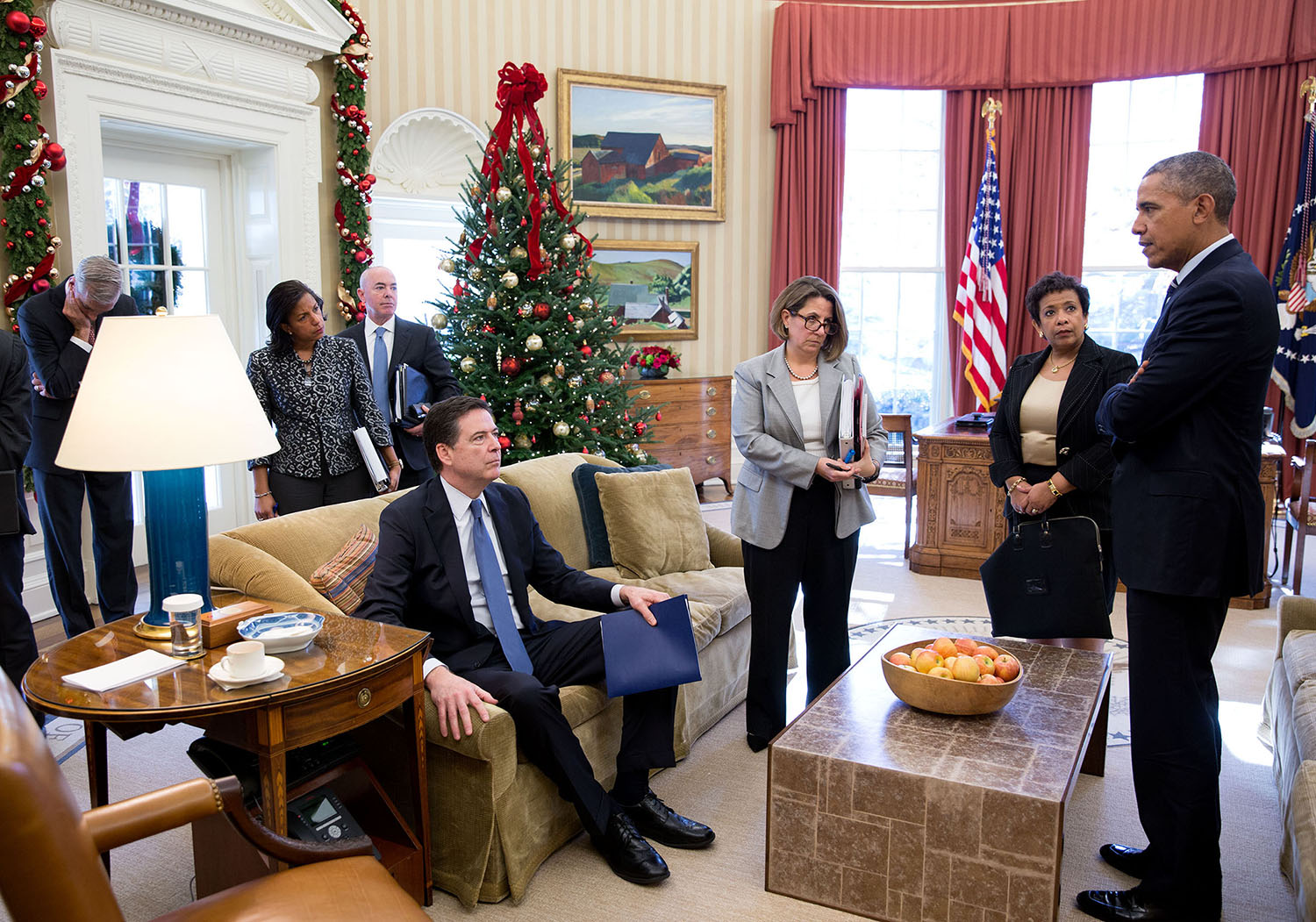
Lynch in the Oval Office following the San Bernardino shooting, December 2015

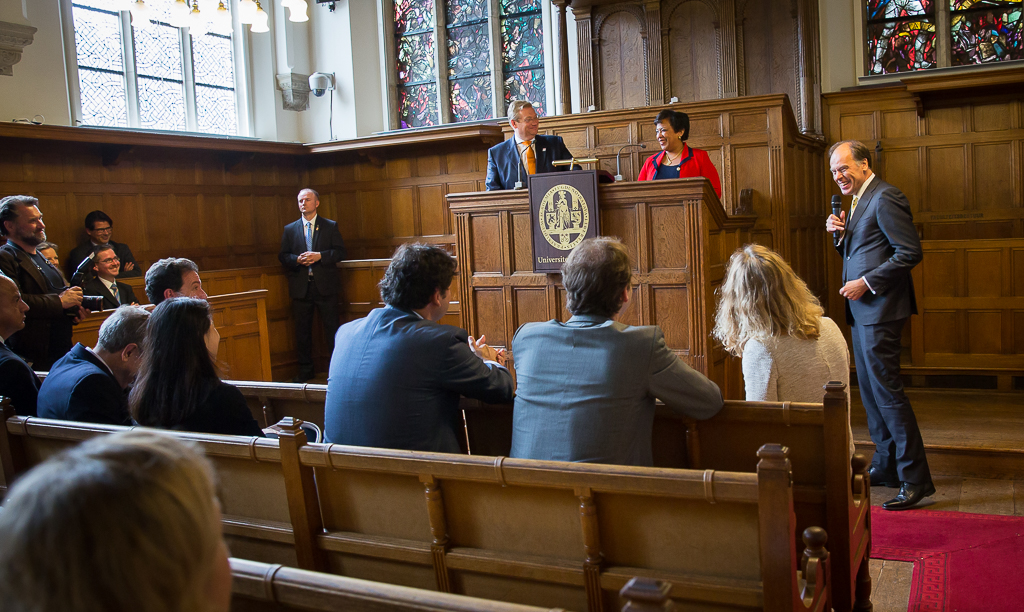
Lynch lecturing to Dutch ministers on EU-US cooperation at Leiden University, 1 June 2016

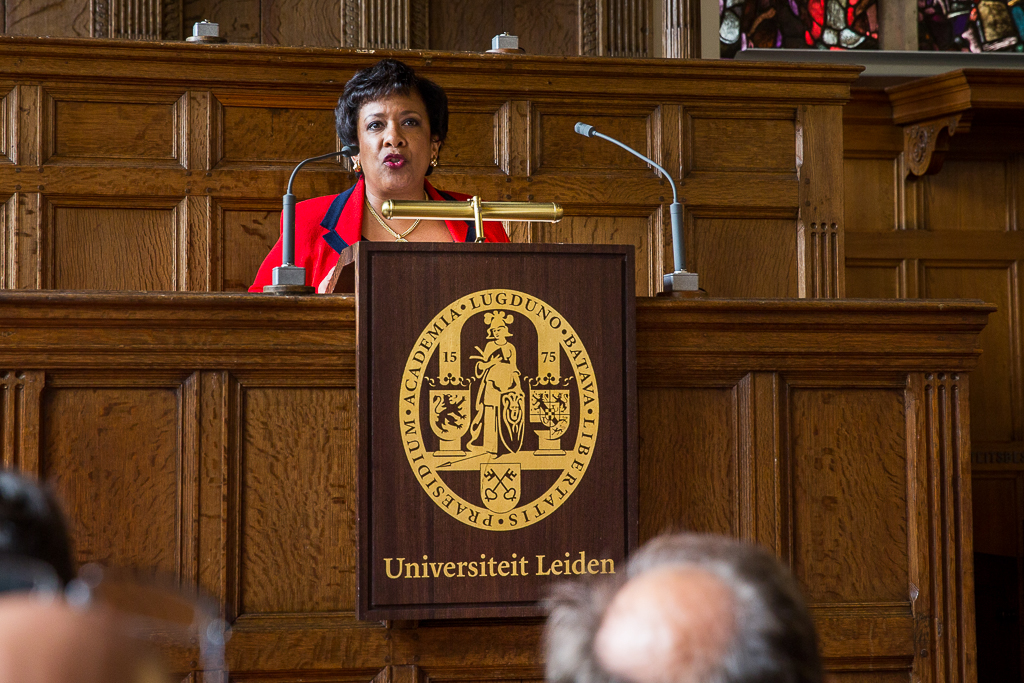
Lynch lecturing to Dutch ministers on EU-US cooperation at Leiden University, 1 June 2016

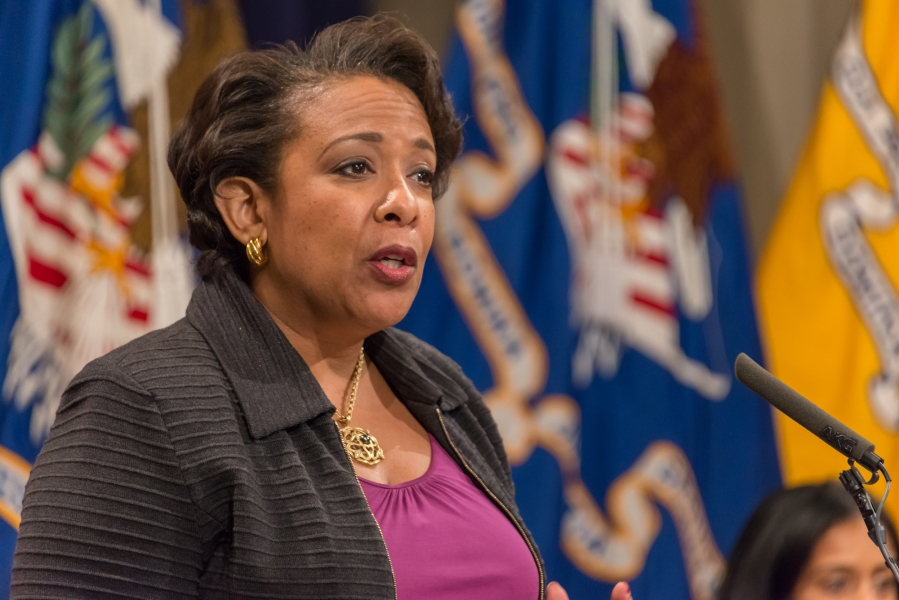
Lynch speaking at a naturalization ceremony, November 2016

In July 2015, after the Charleston church shooting, Lynch announced the suspected shooter Dylann Roof would be charged with a hate crime. On May 24, 2016, she further announced that the Justice Department would seek the death penalty for Roof.

On December 7, 2015, Lynch stated the Justice Department would be investigating the Chicago Police Department to see if there was a potential violation of civil rights in the case of Laquan McDonald.

On March 3, 2016, following the occupation of the Malheur National Wildlife Refuge, Lynch said charges would be filed soon against participants in the standoff while appearing in Portland, Oregon, to commemorate the community's policing.

After the death of Supreme Court justice Antonin Scalia, Lynch's name was mentioned as being a potential nominee to replace him. On March 8, a Justice Department spokesperson said Lynch had asked the White House to withdraw her from consideration.

In April 2016, Lynch took an active role in addressing what she called the difficulty of re-entry into society by felons, writing an op-ed and making public appearances in support of raising awareness.

In May 2016, Lynch delivered the commencement address at Spelman College in Atlanta.

In June 2016, in response to the Orlando nightclub shooting, Lynch made multiple appearances on television news shows to highlight the ongoing investigation of the FBI. She said edited transcripts of the conversation between the shooter and the FBI negotiators would be released. On June 21, Lynch traveled to Orlando to both meet with survivors and inquire into the ongoing investigation, also bringing with her $1 million in emergency funding for Florida, Orange County, and Orlando to help pay for overtime and other investigative costs.

In October 2016, Lynch removed the Brooklyn FBI agents and federal prosecutors from the death of Eric Garner case, replacing them with agents from outside New York. The local FBI agents and federal prosecutors had determined that charges should not be brought in the case, prompting strong disagreement from attorneys in the Washington, D.C. office of the Department's Civil Rights Division. Lynch's intervention has been called "highly unusual".

==== Hillary Clinton email investigation ====
In early March 2016, the FBI reportedly received a highly classified Russian government document earlier obtained by hackers working with Dutch intelligence. The document, which was considered genuine but had "possible translation issues", had purportedly contained a memorialization of an email sent by Debbie Wasserman-Schultz to Leonard Benardo that had allegedly referenced a conversation between Lynch and Amanda Renteria. One of the allegations within the document reportedly said that Renteria had been assured that "Lynch would keep the Clinton investigation from going too far." Although the FBI did not find the information about Lynch to be accurate, FBI Director James Comey said he became concerned that the public's perception of the investigation could become tainted if the document leaked, especially after DCLeaks and Guccifer 2.0 had begun releasing hacked emails in mid-June 2016. He later called the document "one of the bricks in the load" that led to his decision to not consult with the Department of Justice before closing the investigation.

On June 27, 2016, Lynch and former President Bill Clinton met privately aboard Lynch's Justice Department jet while it was parked on the tarmac in Phoenix. ABC15 Phoenix reporter Christopher Sign broke the story on June 29, citing unnamed sources. The next day, during a press conference in Phoenix, Lynch denied the conversation was about the Hillary Clinton email controversy or any matters pertaining to it, saying the discussion instead involved personal social topics such as travels, golf, and grandchildren. On July 1, 2016, Lynch swore she would "fully accept" the recommendation of the FBI and prosecutors regarding the email probe, and admitted that she understood how the meeting was raising "questions and concerns", and that she "certainly wouldn't do it again". On July 6, a day after FBI director James Comey recommended not pressing charges against Clinton, Lynch confirmed the Justice Department had opted to not pursue charges against Clinton and would close the probe into her private email server. On July 12, Lynch testified before Republican lawmakers, on the legal basis of the Justice Department's choice to not prosecute Clinton.

On June 8, 2017, former FBI head James Comey testified under oath that Lynch had instructed him (during the course of a private conversation) to not refer to the Clinton email scandal as an "investigation" and instead refer to it as a "matter". He also said that the directive, combined with Lynch's discussion on a Phoenix tarmac with former President Clinton, led him to make his independent announcement regarding the Clinton email probe last July. In his closely watched Senate Intelligence Committee testimony, otherwise devoted to discussing the circumstances of his firing, Comey said that tarmac meeting was a "deciding factor" in his decision to act alone to update the public on the Clinton probe—and protect the Bureau's reputation.

In June 2017, the Senate Judiciary Committee launched a bipartisan investigation into whether or not Lynch tried to interfere with the Hillary Clinton email investigation. The following month, Lynch issued a statement through her lawyer pledging to cooperate with the investigation and denying the allegation she had given assurances to a Clinton campaign staffer that she would limit the email investigation. The Department of Justice Inspector General also investigated the handling of the Clinton email investigation. The Inspector General's report, released in June 2018, called Lynch's tarmac meeting with Bill Clinton an error of judgment for the public perception it created, but found no political bias.

== Personal life ==
Lynch married Stephen Hargrove in 2007. She uses her married name, Loretta Lynch Hargrove, in her personal life. Her husband has two children from a previous marriage.

== See also ==
- Barack Obama Supreme Court candidates
- List of African American jurists
- List of African-American United States Cabinet members
- List of female justice ministers
- List of female United States Cabinet members

Legal offices
Preceded by Eric Holder	United States Attorney General; 2015–2017	Succeeded by Jeff Sessions
U.S. order of precedence (ceremonial)
Preceded by Bob McDonald as Former U.S. Cabinet Member	Order of precedence of the United States as Former U.S. Cabinet Member	Succeeded by John King Jr. as Former U.S. Cabinet Member
