= Isaac S. Catlin =

American politician

Isaac Swartwood Catlin
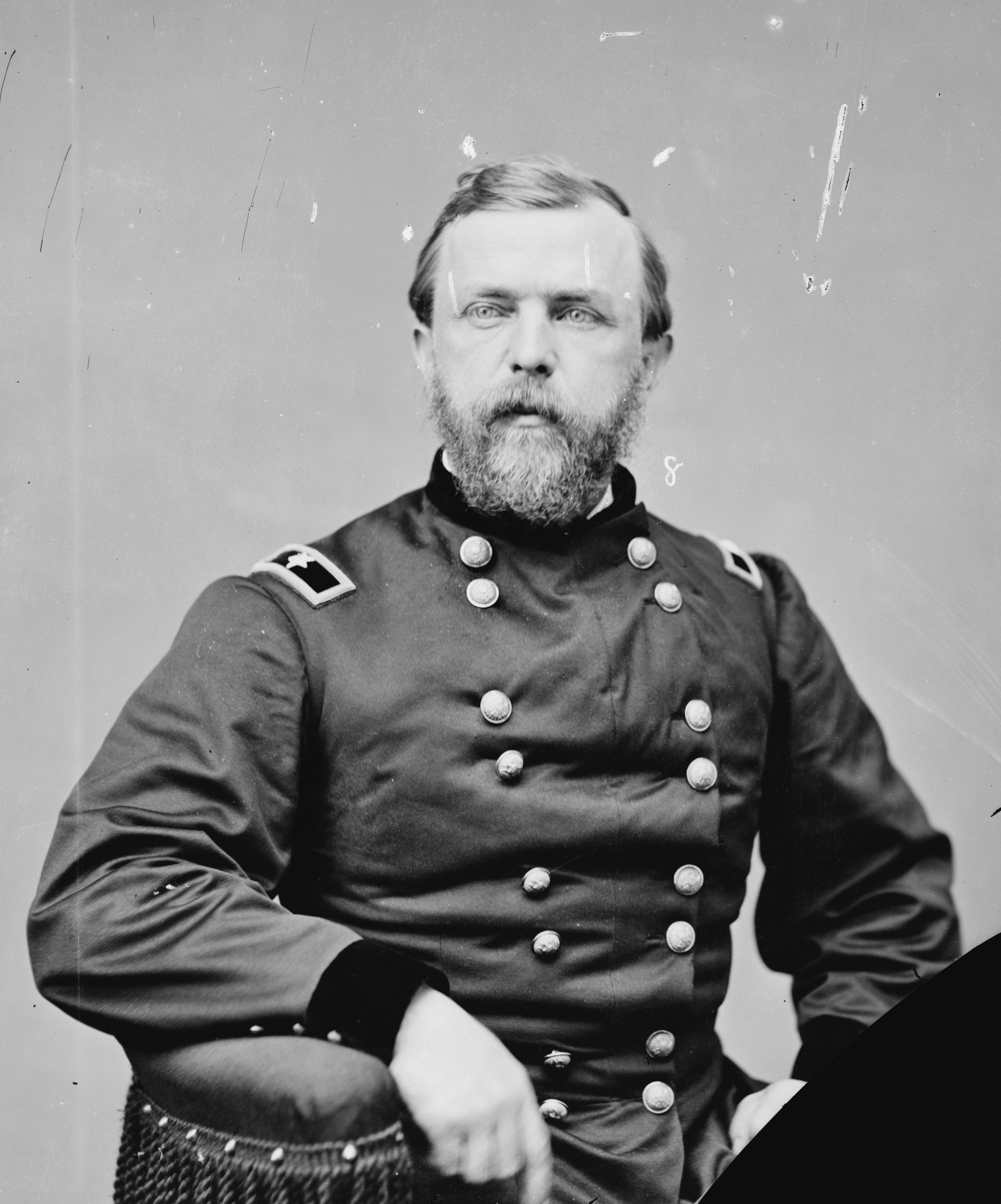
- Isaac S. Catlin
- Born: July 8, 1835; Owego, New York, US
- Died: January 19, 1916 (aged 80); Brooklyn, New York, US
- Burial place: Arlington National Cemetery
- Relatives: Benjamin F. Tracy (brother-in-law)
- Military career
- Allegiance: United States
- Branch: United States Army; Union Army
- Service years: 1861 – 1865; 1867 – 1870
- Rank: Brevet Major General
- Unit: 109th New York Volunteer Infantry Regiment
- Commands: 109th New York Volunteer Infantry Regiment
- Conflicts: American Civil War; Battle of Big Bethel; Battle of the Crater (WIA)
- Awards: Medal of Honor

Isaac Swartwood Catlin (July 8, 1835 – January 19, 1916) was an American lawyer and a decorated officer in the American Civil War. A native of Owego, New York, he studied law in New York City before returning to Owego to begin his career. He joined the Union Army in the first days of the Civil War and rose to commander of the 109th New York Volunteer Infantry Regiment. Severely wounded during the Battle of the Crater, he remained on the field and led his regiment until he was injured a second time, resulting in the loss of his leg. For this action he was awarded the U.S. military's highest decoration, the Medal of Honor. After the war, he moved to Brooklyn and established himself as a criminal defense lawyer and district attorney. He was politically active but lost a race for Mayor of Brooklyn and declined several other opportunities to run for higher offices.

== Early life and family ==
Catlin was born on July 8, 1835, in Owego, New York, to Nathaniel and Jane (Brodhead) Catlin. After receiving his early education at Owego Academy, he attended Hobart College in Geneva for a single year. In 1856, he moved to New York City to study law and was admitted to the bar the next year. Returning to Owego in 1859, he joined his brother-in-law Benjamin F. Tracy's law firm, Tracy, Warner & Walker. Tracy, who had married Catlin's sister Delinda in 1851, would also earn the Medal of Honor in the Civil War and would go on to become United States Secretary of the Navy. Catlin was elected mayor of Owego in 1860 and continued in that role until the outbreak of war. In 1862 in Brooklyn, Catlin married Virginia H.S. Bacon; the couple had one son and one daughter.

== Military service ==
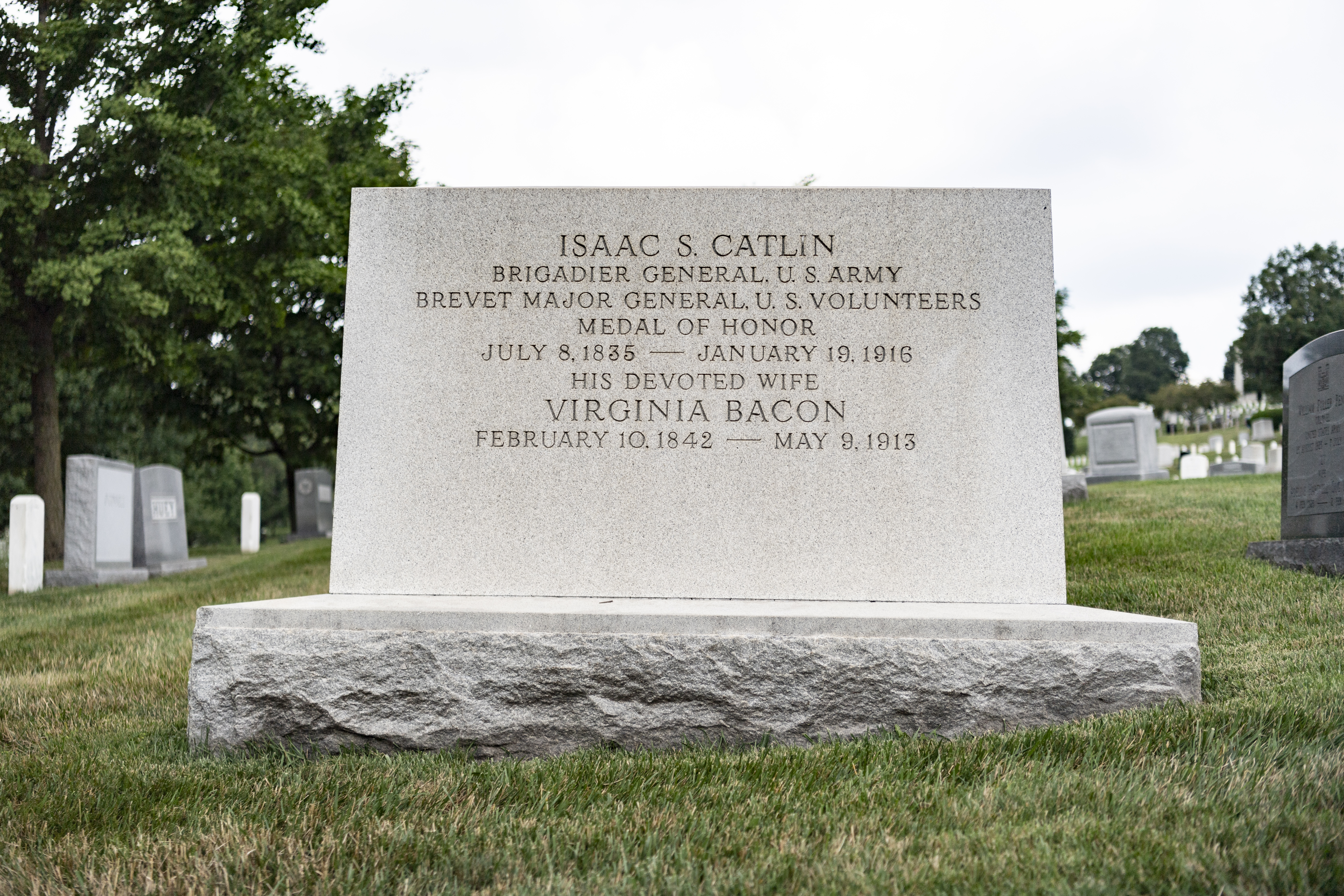
Grave at Arlington National Cemetery

Immediately after President Abraham Lincoln's call for volunteers at the beginning of the Civil War, Catlin raised a company of infantry and was appointed its captain. The unit, said to be "the first full company which enlisted in the North," was mustered in on May 14, 1861, as part of Frederick Townsend's 3rd New York Volunteer Infantry Regiment. Regarding the regiment's participation in the Battle of Big Bethel on June 10, 1861, Townsend remarked: "There was no braver officer on that field than Captain Catlin." Following the battle, the unit was stationed at Fort McHenry in Maryland.

Catlin resigned his position in the 3rd New York on March 14, 1862, and rejoined the Army five months later, on August 2, with the 109th New York Volunteer Infantry Regiment. He began his service with the 109th as a first lieutenant but was promoted to lieutenant colonel only weeks later.

Promoted to full colonel on July 29, 1864, he led the 109th New York in the Battle of the Crater at Petersburg, Virginia, the next day. During the battle, he was seriously wounded but returned to the field and continued to lead his regiment until being struck a second time. The second wound necessitated the amputation of his right leg. For this action, he was given a brevet promotion to major general on March 13, 1865, and awarded the Medal of Honor several decades later, on January 13, 1899. Catlin's official Medal of Honor citation reads:

In a heroic effort to rally the disorganized troops was disabled by a severe wound. While being carried from the field he recovered somewhat and bravely started to return to his command, when he received a second wound, which necessitated amputation of his right leg.

Catlin was mustered out of the volunteer army on June 4, 1865, and joined the regular army as a captain on May 6, 1867. On that same date, he was given the regular army brevet ranks of major, for his actions at the Battle of the Wilderness, and lieutenant colonel, for his actions at Petersburg. He retired from the military on May 6, 1870, and was simultaneously promoted to colonel. While on the retired list he was again promoted, to brigadier general, on April 23, 1904.

== Legal and political career ==
After the war, Catlin returned to the practice of law in Owego before moving to Brooklyn and establishing a legal career there. He was elected the district attorney of Tioga County in 1865 and six years later, in 1871, formed a law partnership in Brooklyn with his brother-in-law, Benjamin F. Tracy. That same year, he became an Assistant Attorney for the Eastern District of New York. He worked as a criminal defense lawyer and served as legal counsel for the Kings County Sheriff for nine years. In 1877 he was elected Kings County District Attorney and was re-elected to that position in 1880. Catlin was also involved in politics; he was a Republican except for a period from 1888 to 1896, when he identified as a "Cleveland Democrat". He ran for Mayor of the City of Brooklyn in 1885 but was unsuccessful. He turned down nominations to run for Congress in 1893 and for Lieutenant Governor of New York on the Democratic ticket in 1896.

At the outbreak of the Spanish–American War in 1898, Catlin volunteered for military duty but was turned down due to his advanced age. He instead visited Cuba and the Philippines and wrote widely published reports on the situations in those areas. His son, George de Grasse Catlin, served in the U.S. Army during the war and rose to the rank of captain.

In his later years, Catlin split his time between homes in Brooklyn and Owego. He was a member of the New York Society of Colonial Wars. In January 1916 he had a stroke and died a week later, on January 19, at his apartment in Brooklyn's Hotel St. George. Aged 80 at his death, he was buried at Arlington National Cemetery in Arlington County, Virginia.

Legal offices
| Preceded by Winchester Britton | Kings County District Attorney; 1878–1884 | Succeeded by James W. Ridgway |
