= John Lord O'Brian =

American lawyer

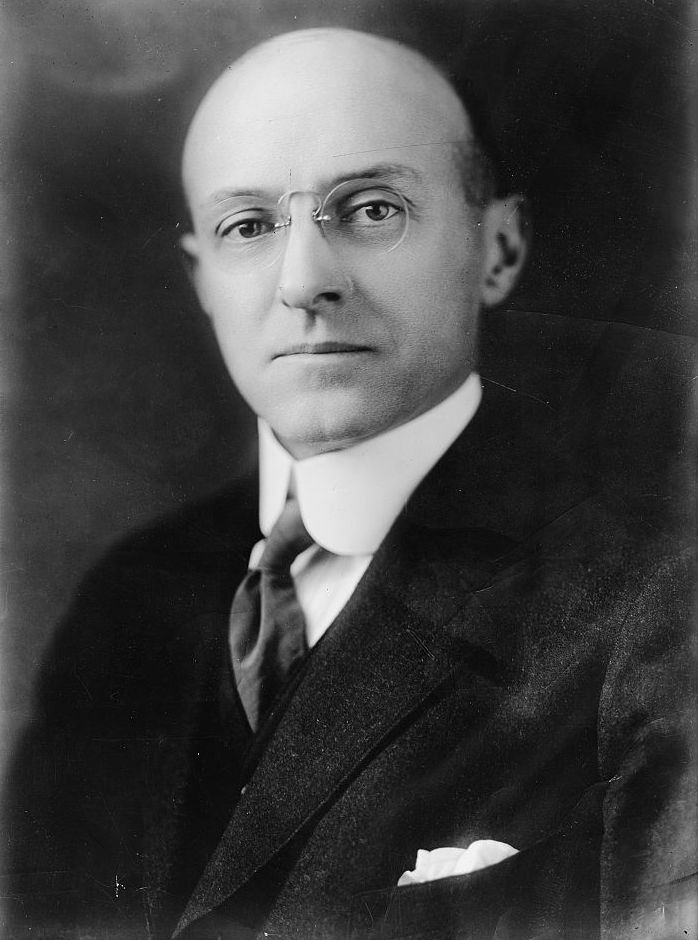

United States Attorney for the Western District of New York
- In office 1909–1914
- Nominated by: Theodore Roosevelt
- Preceded by: Lyman M. Bass
- Succeeded by: Stephen T. Lockwood

Special Assistant Attorney General, War Emergency Division, U.S. Department of Justice
- In office 1917–1919
- Nominated by: Woodrow Wilson

Assistant Attorney General for the Antitrust Division
- In office 1929–1933
- Nominated by: Herbert Hoover
- Preceded by: William J. Donovan
- Succeeded by: Robert H. Jackson

General Counsel, War Production Board
- In office 1941–1944
- Nominated by: Franklin Roosevelt

Personal details
- Born: October 14, 1874 Buffalo, New York, U.S.
- Died: April 11, 1973 (aged 98) George Washington University Hospital; Washington, D.C., U.S.
- Resting place: Washington National Cathedral
- Party: Republican
- Children: Esther Lord O'Brian
- Education: Harvard University; University of Buffalo Law School

John Lord O'Brian (October 14, 1874 – April 11, 1973) was an American lawyer who held public offices in the administrations of five U.S. presidents between 1909 and 1945. O'Brian has been recognized by scholars for his commitment to civil liberties. At the time of O'Brian's death at the age of 98, Chief Justice Warren Burger described him as the "dean" of the bar of the Supreme Court of the United States.

== Early life and career in New York ==
John Lord O'Brian was born in Buffalo, New York. He attended public schools there before matriculating to Harvard College. After receiving a bachelor of arts (A.B.) degree from Harvard in 1896, O'Brian returned to his hometown and received a bachelor of laws (L.L.B.) degree from the University of Buffalo Law School in 1898.

O'Brian's career in public office began at the age of 32, when he was elected as a Republican candidate to represent Buffalo in the New York State Assembly in the election of November 1906. While in the State Assembly, O'Brian was considered a consistent supporter of Governor Charles Evans Hughes Sr.

Hughes recommended O'Brian to President Theodore Roosevelt for the position of United States Attorney for the Western District of New York; O'Brian left the State Assembly to take that position in 1909. O'Brian served as the U.S. Attorney throughout the subsequent administration of President William Howard Taft. O'Brian also continued in that office into the administration of Democratic President Woodrow Wilson, thus beginning a bipartisan path of serving as an appointed office holder under both Republican and Democratic administrations. In his role as the federal government's principal attorney in western New York, O'Brian in 1913 filed an antitrust lawsuit alleging that the Eastman Kodak Company was maintaining an unlawful monopoly on photographic films and equipment.

In 1913, O'Brian unsuccessfully ran for Mayor of the City of Buffalo. He lost to incumbent mayor Louis P. Fuhrmann in a three-way race. He was the nominee of both the Progressive and Citizens parties, netting 23,757 votes to Democrat Louis Fuhrmann's 30,219 and Republican Thomas Stoddart's 13,447.

In 1915, O'Brian was a delegate to the New York Constitutional Convention.

== Justice Department Service During World War I ==
In 1917, O'Brian went to Washington, D.C. to serve as a special assistant attorney general to Thomas Watt Gregory, the U.S. Attorney General under President Wilson. Gregory placed O'Brian in charge of the Department of Justice's newly-formed War Emergency Division, which was responsible for enforcing the Espionage Act of 1917 and later its amendments known as the Sedition Act of 1918.

Although responsible for enforcing these congressional acts, O'Brian considered some of their provisions to be unconstitutional and declined to defend those provisions in court. To control unfettered and inconsistent enforcement of the statutes, O'Brian forbade local federal prosecutors from filing charges of espionage, sedition, or treason without approval from his Division in Washington. Working with fellow Justice Department attorney Alfred Bettman, O'Brian shaped the Department's interpretation of the wartime statutes and the prosecution strategy for enforcing them. In the words of historian Theodore Kornweibel, O'Brian and Bettman "attempted to curb the most egregious violations of civil liberties." To the extent that O'Brian considered the statutes' provisions to be consistent with the U.S. Constitution, however, he played an active role in their enforcement. For example, O'Brian personally argued on behalf of the United States before the U.S. Supreme Court in the appeals brought by Charles Schenck (Schenck v. United States) and Eugene Debs (Debs v. United States) from their convictions for violating the Espionage Act of 1917.

While in charge of the War Emergency Division, O'Brian hired J. Edgar Hoover, who had just finished his legal education in Washington. Impressed with Hoover's diligence, O'Brian promoted him to Special Agent in charge of the Division's Alien Enemy Bureau. O'Brian later said of hiring Hoover, "It is one of the sins for which I have to atone."

== Activity Between the World Wars ==
O'Brian left the Justice Department in 1919 and returned to the practice of law in Buffalo. Before the end of that year, he was mentioned as a potential Republican Party candidate for Governor of New York. A faction of Progressive Republicans in New York also tried to enlist O'Brian to run in 1920 as challenger for the party's U.S. Senate nomination against incumbent Republican Senator James Wadsworth Jr. Those Progressives cited O'Brian's support for women's suffrage as one of the reasons to prefer him to Wadsworth. O'Brian, however, declined to seek that nomination.

With the election of President Herbert Hoover in 1928, O'Brian was considered for the position of U.S. Solicitor General, but was passed over in favor of Charles Evans Hughes Jr. Instead, O'Brian served in the Hoover administration from 1929 to 1933 as the Assistant Attorney General in charge of the Antitrust Division of the Justice Department. In this role, O'Brian argued on behalf of the federal government (including the Federal Trade Commission) in more than 20 cases before the U.S. Supreme Court.

Upon leaving the Justice Department in 1933, O'Brian returned to private practice in Buffalo. There his clients included Pierce-Arrow Motor Car Company, which he counseled as the luxury car maker struggled to remain in business during the Great Depression.

In the later 1930s, the Tennessee Valley Authority hired O'Brian as counsel to defend legal challenges to the constitutionality of the federally-owned corporation. As lead counsel, O'Brian twice argued before the U.S. Supreme Court in cases that upheld the TVA's legality.

In the congressional election of 1938, O'Brian ran unsuccessfully as a Republican against incumbent Democratic Senator Robert F. Wagner.

At the 1940 Republican National Convention, O'Brian gave the nomination speech for Thomas E. Dewey, saying that Dewey could "be trusted to keep the country out of war." O'Brian likewise said that Dewey was "a life-long" Republican, that is, not like Wendell Willkie.

== War Production Board Service During World War II ==
During World War II, O'Brian served as general counsel to the Office of Production Management and to its successor, the War Production Board. O'Brian played a central role in organizing the Board's wartime activities and determining the scope of its authority.

== Activity After World War II ==
When his government service concluded in the last months of World War II, O'Brian joined the Washington, D.C., law firm Covington & Burling on January 1, 1945. The name of the law firm changed several times before and after O'Brian's arrival, particularly when partner Dean Acheson either left for or returned from government office; by 1950, it was known as Covington, Burling, Rublee, O'Brian & Shorb. When Paul Shorb died, it was O'Brian who proposed that the name revert to simply Covington & Burling, which it has remained since 1951.

O'Brian remained actively engaged in the practice of law beyond his 75th birthday. In 1949, O'Brian counseled Major League Baseball Commissioner Happy Chandler in responding to challenges to the antitrust exemption that had been recognized by the U.S. Supreme Court in 1922 in Federal Baseball Club v. National League. In 1952, at the age of 77, he acted as co-counsel with John W. Davis in successfully opposing the Truman Administration's effort to take possession and operational control of the American steel industry in the Steel Seizure Case. In January 1956, at the age of 81, O'Brian argued for the last time before the U.S. Supreme Court. More than a year later, he was still arguing for clients before the federal circuit court of appeals in Washington, D.C.

In 1955, O'Brian delivered the Godkin Lectures at Harvard University, entitling his series "Security in an Age of Anxiety." His lectures were published by Harvard under the title "National Security and Individual Freedom." Speaking just months after the December 1954 Senate censure of Senator Joseph McCarthy, and reflecting on his World War I experience at the Justice Department, O'Brian warned against the danger of "craving for security at any price" and expressed his discomfort with many Cold War security and loyalty programs.

He died on April 11, 1973.

== Recognitions ==
The law school building at the State University of New York at Buffalo is named after O'Brian.

In 1956, a professorship at Harvard Divinity School was endowed by admirers of O'Brian and named in his honor, recognizing his service in the late 1940s as chairman of a committee dedicated to "revitalizing" that school.

Party political offices
Preceded by George Z. Medalie	Republican nominee for U.S. Senator from New York (Class 3); 1938	Succeeded by Thomas J. Curran
