= 135th New York State Legislature =

New York state legislative session

←	134th	136th	→
- New York State Capitol (2009)

Overview
- Legislative body: New York State Legislature
- Jurisdiction: New York, United States
- Term: January 1 – December 31, 1912

Senate
- Members: 51
- President: Lt. Gov. Thomas F. Conway (D)
- Temporary President: Robert F. Wagner (D)
- Party control: Democratic (29-21)

Assembly
- Members: 150
- Speaker: Edwin A. Merritt Jr. (R)
- Party control: Republican (100-48-1)

Sessions
- 1st: January 3 – March 29, 1912

The 135th New York State Legislature, consisting of the New York State Senate and the New York State Assembly, met from January 3 to March 29, 1912, during the second year of John Alden Dix's governorship, in Albany.

== Background ==
Under the provisions of the New York Constitution of 1894, re-apportioned in 1906 and 1907, 51 Senators and 150 assemblymen were elected in single-seat districts; senators for a two-year term, assemblymen for a one-year term. The senatorial districts were made up of entire counties, except New York County (twelve districts), Kings County (eight districts), Erie County (three districts) and Monroe County (two districts). The Assembly districts were made up of contiguous area, all within the same county.

At this time there were two major political parties: the Republican Party and the Democratic Party.

== Elections ==
The 1911 New York state election was held on November 7. No statewide elective offices were up for election. For the first time, a Socialist was elected to the Assembly.

== Sessions ==
The Legislature met for the regular session at the State Capitol in Albany on January 3, 1912; and adjourned on March 29.

Edwin A. Merritt Jr. (R) was elected Speaker with 95 votes against 45 for Al Smith (D).

On April 19, Bronx County was created by the Legislature, to be effectively separated from New York County on January 1, 1914. To date, this was the last county created in the State of New York.

== State Senate ==
=== Districts ===
- 1st District: Nassau and Suffolk counties
- 2nd District: Queens County, i.e the Borough of Queens
- 3rd, 4th, 5th, 6th, 7th, 8th, 9th and 10th District: Parts of Kings County, i.e. the Borough of Brooklyn
- 11th, 12th, 13th, 14th, 15th, 16th, 17th, 18th, 19th, 20th, 21st and 22nd District: Parts of New York County, i.e. the boroughs of Manhattan and the Bronx
- 23rd District: Richmond and Rockland counties
- 24th District: Westchester County
- 25th District: Orange and Sullivan counties
- 26th District: Columbia, Dutchess and Putnam and counties
- 27th District: Greene and Ulster counties
- 28th District: Albany County
- 29th District: Rensselaer County
- 30th District: Saratoga and Washington counties
- 31st District: Montgomery, Schenectady and Schoharie counties
- 32nd District: Lewis, Fulton, Hamilton and Herkimer counties
- 33rd District: Clinton, Essex and Warren counties
- 34th District: Franklin and St. Lawrence counties
- 35th District: Jefferson and Oswego counties
- 36th District: Oneida County
- 37th District: Chenango, Madison and Otsego counties
- 38th District: Onondaga County
- 39th District: Broome and Delaware counties
- 40th District: Cayuga, Cortland and Seneca counties
- 41st District: Chemung, Schuyler, Tioga and Tompkins counties
- 42nd District: Ontario, Wayne and Yates counties
- 43rd District: Steuben and Livingston counties
- 44th District: Allegany, Genesee and Wyoming counties
- 45th and 46th District: Monroe County
- 47th District: Niagara and Orleans counties
- 48th, 49th and 50th District: Erie County
- 51st District: Cattaraugus and Chautauqua counties

=== Members ===
The asterisk (*) denotes members of the previous Legislature who continued in office as members of this Legislature.

District	Senator	Party	Notes
1st	James L. Long*	Democrat	
2nd	Dennis J. Harte*	Democrat	
3rd	Thomas H. Cullen*	Democrat	
4th	Loring M. Black Jr.*	Democrat	
5th	Barth S. Cronin*	Democrat	
6th	Eugene M. Travis*	Republican	
7th	Thomas C. Harden*	Democrat	
8th	James F. Duhamel*	Democrat	
9th	Felix J. Sanner*	Democrat	
10th	James H. O'Brien*	Democrat	on November 5, 1912, elected to the 63rd U.S. Congress
11th	Christopher D. Sullivan*	Democrat	
12th	Timothy D. Sullivan*	Democrat	on November 5, 1912, elected to the 63rd U.S. Congress
13th	James D. McClelland*	Democrat	
14th	(Thomas F. Grady)*	Democrat	did not take his seat, and died on February 3, 1912
15th	Thomas J. McManus*	Democrat	
16th	Robert F. Wagner*	Democrat	President pro tempore
17th	John G. Saxe*	Democrat	
18th	Henry W. Pollock*	Democrat	
19th	Josiah T. Newcomb*	Republican	
20th	James J. Frawley*	Democrat	
21st	Stephen J. Stilwell*	Democrat	
22nd	Anthony J. Griffin*	Democrat	
23rd	Howard R. Bayne*	Democrat	
24th	J. Mayhew Wainwright*	Republican	
25th	John B. Rose*	Republican	
26th	Franklin D. Roosevelt*	Democrat	
27th	William P. Fiero*	Democrat	
28th	Henry M. Sage*	Republican	
29th	Victor M. Allen*	Republican	
30th	Edgar T. Brackett*	Republican	Minority Leader
31st	Loren H. White*	Democrat	
32nd	Seth G. Heacock*	Republican	
33rd	James A. Emerson*	Republican	
34th	Herbert P. Coats*	Republican	
35th	George H. Cobb*	Republican	
36th	T. Harvey Ferris*	Democrat	
37th	Ralph W. Thomas*	Republican	
38th	J. Henry Walters*	Republican	
39th	Harvey D. Hinman*	Republican	
40th	Charles J. Hewitt*	Republican	
41st	John F. Murtaugh*	Democrat	
42nd	Frederick W. Griffith*	Republican	
43rd	Frank C. Platt*	Republican	
44th	Thomas H. Bussey*	Republican	
45th	George F. Argetsinger*	Republican	
46th	William L. Ormrod*	Republican	
47th	Robert H. Gittins*	Democrat	on November 5, 1912, elected to the 63rd U.S. Congress
48th	Frank M. Loomis*	Democrat	
49th	Samuel J. Ramsperger*	Democrat	
50th	George B. Burd*	Democrat	
51st	Charles Mann Hamilton*	Republican	on November 5, 1912, elected to the 63rd U.S. Congress

=== Employees ===
- Clerk: Patrick E. McCabe
- Sergeant-at-Arms: Harry E. Oxford
- Assistant Sergeant-at-Arms: John J. Dillon
- Principal Doorkeeper: Fred W. Theobold
- Assistant Doorkeeper: Thomas Nolan
- Stenographer: William E. Reynolds

== State Assembly ==
Note: For brevity, the chairmanships omit the words "...the Committee on (the)..."

=== Assemblymen ===
District		Assemblymen	Party	Notes
Albany	1st	Harold J. Hinman*	Republican	Chairman of Judiciary
Albany	2nd	John G. Malone	Republican	
Albany	3rd	John Gibeau	Republican	
Allegany		Ransom L. Richardson	Republican	
Broome		Arthur J. Ruland	Democrat	
Cattaraugus		Ellsworth J. Cheney*	Republican	Chairman of Public Education
Cayuga		Michael Grace	Republican	
Chautauqua	1st	Julius Lincoln*	Republican	Chairman of Charitable and Religious Societies
Chautauqua	2nd	John Leo Sullivan*	Republican	Chairman of Affairs of Villages
Chemung		Robert P. Bush*	Democrat	
Chenango		Walter A. Shepardson*	Republican	Chairman of Soldiers' Home
Clinton		Charles J. Vert	Republican	
Columbia		John L. Crandell	Republican	
Cortland		Charles F. Brown*	Republican	Chairman of Public Health
Delaware		Clayton L. Wheeler*	Democrat	
Dutchess	1st	Myron Smith	Republican	Chairman of Excise
Dutchess	2nd	Lewis Stuyvesant Chanler*	Democrat	
Erie	1st	Charles C. Page	Republican	
Erie	2nd	Clinton T. Horton	Republican	
Erie	3rd	Henry J. Rahl	Republican	
Erie	4th	Edward D. Jackson*	Democrat	
Erie	5th	Richard F. Hearn*	Democrat	
Erie	6th	James M. Rozan	Democrat	
Erie	7th	Gottfried H. Wende*	Democrat	
Erie	8th	Clarence MacGregor*	Republican	Chairman of Codes
Erie	9th	Frank B. Thorn*	Republican	Chairman of General Laws
Essex		Spencer G. Prime II	Republican	
Franklin		Alexander Macdonald*	Republican	Chairman of Forestry, Fisheries and Game
Fulton and Hamilton		Alden Hart*	Republican	
Genesee		Clarence Bryant*	Republican	
Greene		J. Lewis Patrie*	Democrat	
Herkimer		Theodore Douglas Robinson	Republican	
Jefferson	1st	Henry E. Machold	Republican	
Jefferson	2nd	John G. Jones*	Republican	Chairman of Printed and Engrossed Bills
Kings	1st	Daniel V. Barnes	Republican	
Kings	2nd	William J. Gillen*	Democrat	
Kings	3rd	Michael A. O'Neil*	Democrat	
Kings	4th	George Langhorst	Republican	
Kings	5th	Abraham F. Lent*	Republican	
Kings	6th	George Heiberger	Republican	
Kings	7th	Daniel F. Farrell*	Democrat	
Kings	8th	John J. McKeon*	Democrat	
Kings	9th	Albert H. T. Banzhaf	Republican	
Kings	10th	Fred M. Ahern*	Republican	
Kings	11th	William W. Colne*	Republican	Chairman of Affairs of Cities
Kings	12th	Frederick W. Singleton	Republican	
Kings	13th	Charles Schmitt	Republican	
Kings	14th	James J. Garvey	Democrat	
Kings	15th	Thomas E. Willmott	Democrat	
Kings	16th	Forrest S. Chilton	Republican	
Kings	17th	Edward A. Ebbets*	Republican	Chairman of Commerce and Navigation
Kings	18th	Almeth W. Hoff*	Republican	
Kings	19th	Jacob Schifferdecker*	Democrat	
Kings	20th	Frank Bennett	Republican	
Kings	21st	Harry Heyman*	Democrat	
Kings	22nd	Edward R. W. Karutz	Republican	
Kings	23rd	William F. Mathewson	Republican	
Lewis		Humphrey E. Slocum	Republican	Chairman of Labor and Industries
Livingston		John C. Winters Jr.*	Republican	
Madison		Morell E. Tallett	Republican	
Monroe	1st	Jared W. Hopkins	Republican	
Monroe	2nd	Simon L. Adler*	Republican	
Monroe	3rd	August V. Pappert*	Republican	
Monroe	4th	Cyrus W. Phillips*	Republican	
Monroe	5th	William T. Keys*	Republican	
Montgomery		Walter A. Gage	Republican	
Nassau		Jeremiah Wood	Republican	
New York	1st	Thomas B. Caughlan*	Democrat	
New York	2nd	Al Smith*	Democrat	Minority Leader
New York	3rd	John C. Fitzgerald	Democrat	
New York	4th	Aaron J. Levy*	Democrat	
New York	5th	Jimmy Walker*	Democrat	
New York	6th	Harry Kopp*	Republican	Chairman of Privileges and Elections
New York	7th	Peter P. McElligott*	Democrat	
New York	8th	Moritz Graubard*	Democrat	
New York	9th	John C. Hackett*	Democrat	
New York	10th	Meyer Greenberg	Democrat	
New York	11th	John J. Boylan*	Democrat	
New York	12th	James A. Foley*	Democrat	
New York	13th	James C. Campbell	Democrat	
New York	14th	John J. Herrick*	Democrat	
New York	15th	Henry J. Crawford	Republican	
New York	16th	Martin G. McCue*	Democrat	
New York	17th	Franklin Brooks*	Republican	Chairman of Military Affairs
New York	18th	Mark Goldberg*	Democrat	
New York	19th	Andrew F. Murray*	Republican	
New York	20th	Patrick J. McGrath*	Democrat	
New York	21st	Dean Nelson	Republican	
New York	22nd	Edward Weil*	Democrat	
New York	23rd	Sidney C. Crane	Republican	
New York	24th	Thomas A. Brennan*	Democrat	
New York	25th	Francis R. Stoddard Jr.	Republican	
New York	26th	Abram Goodman*	Republican	
New York	27th	Charles A. Dana	Republican	
New York	28th	Jacob Levy*	Democrat	
New York	29th	Thomas S. Coleman	Republican	
New York	30th	Louis A. Cuvillier*	Democrat	
New York	31st	Max Shlivek*	Republican	Chairman of Claims
New York	32nd	Morris S. Schector	Republican	
New York	33rd	William B. Ruddick	Republican	
New York	34th	Charles I. Fleck	Republican	
New York	35th	John Yule	Republican	
Niagara	1st	Karl S. Brong	Republican	
Niagara	2nd	Henry A. Constantine*	Republican	
Oneida	1st	Ralph Entwistle	Republican	
Oneida	2nd	Herbert E. Allen*	Republican	Chairman of Banks
Oneida	3rd	James T. Cross*	Republican	Chairman of Insurance
Onondaga	1st	Charles R. Milford	Republican	
Onondaga	2nd	David L. Edwards	Republican	
Onondaga	3rd	Thomas K. Smith*	Republican	Chairman of Revision
Ontario		Thomas B. Wilson*	Republican	Chairman of Agriculture
Orange	1st	Caleb H. Baumes*	Republican	Chairman of Taxation and Retrenchment
Orange	2nd	John D. Stivers*	Republican	Chairman of Public Printing
Orleans		Frank A. Waters*	Republican	
Oswego		Thaddeus C. Sweet*	Republican	Chairman of Canals
Otsego		Willard G. Bullion	Republican	
Putnam		John R. Yale*	Republican	Chairman of Electricity, Gas and Water Supply
Queens	1st	Andrew Zorn*	Democrat	
Queens	2nd	Alfred J. Kennedy*	Democrat	
Queens	3rd	Adam Metz Jr.	Republican	
Queens	4th	James A. Bell	Republican	
Rensselaer	1st	Charles Fred Schwarz	Democrat	
Rensselaer	2nd	(Bradford R. Lansing)*	Republican	Chairman of Internal Affairs; did not take his seat, and died on February 4, 1912
Richmond		Ralph R. McKee	Democrat	
Rockland		George A. Blauvelt*	Democrat	
St. Lawrence	1st	Frank L. Seaker	Republican	
St. Lawrence	2nd	Edwin A. Merritt Jr.*	Republican	elected Speaker; Chairman of Rules; on November 5, 1912, elected to the 62nd and 63rd U.S. Congresses
Saratoga		George H. Whitney	Republican	Chairman of Ways and Means
Schenectady		Herbert M. Merrill	Socialist	
Schoharie		Daniel D. Frisbie*	Democrat	
Schuyler		John W. Gurnett*	Democrat	
Seneca		Nelson Duntz	Republican	
Steuben	1st	Thomas Shannon*	Republican	
Steuben	2nd	John Seeley*	Democrat	
Suffolk	1st	DeWitt C. Talmage*	Republican	
Suffolk	2nd	George L. Thompson	Republican	Chairman of Public Institutions
Sullivan		John K. Evans*	Democrat	
Tioga		John G. Pembleton	Republican	
Tompkins		Minor McDaniels*	Democrat	
Ulster	1st	Andrew J. Cook	Republican	
Ulster	2nd	Samuel C. Waring*	Republican	
Warren		Henry E. H. Brereton*	Republican	
Washington		James S. Parker*	Republican	Chairman of Railroads; on November 5, 1912, elected to the 63rd U.S. Congress
Wayne		Albert Yeomans*	Republican	
Westchester	1st	Tracy P. Madden	Democrat	
Westchester	2nd	William S. Coffey*	Republican	Chairman of Penal Institutions
Westchester	3rd	Frank L. Young*	Republican	Majority Leader
Westchester	4th	George A. Slater	Republican	
Wyoming		Henry A. Pierce*	Republican	
Yates		Edward C. Gillett	Republican	

=== Employees ===
- Clerk: Fred W. Hammond
- Sergeant-at-Arms: Harry W. Haines
- Principal Doorkeeper: Michael Kehoe
- First Assistant Doorkeeper: James B. Hulse
- Second Assistant Doorkeeper: D. C. Easton
- Stenographer: Henry C. Lammert
- Postmaster: James H. Underwood

== Sources ==
- Official New York from Cleveland to Hughes by Charles Elliott Fitch (Hurd Publishing Co., New York and Buffalo, 1911, Vol. IV; see pg. 367 for senators)
- Journal of the Senate (135th Session) (1912; Vol. I)
- Journal of the Assembly (135th Session) (1912; Vol. I; from January 3 to March 20)
- Journal of the Assembly (135th Session) (1912; Vol. II; from March 20 to 29)
- REPUBLICANS SEE BIG GAINS AHEAD in NYT on October 29, 1911
- COMMITTEE PLUMS GO TO MERRITT BACKERS in NYT on January 11, 1912
