= Thomas J. Curran =

American politician

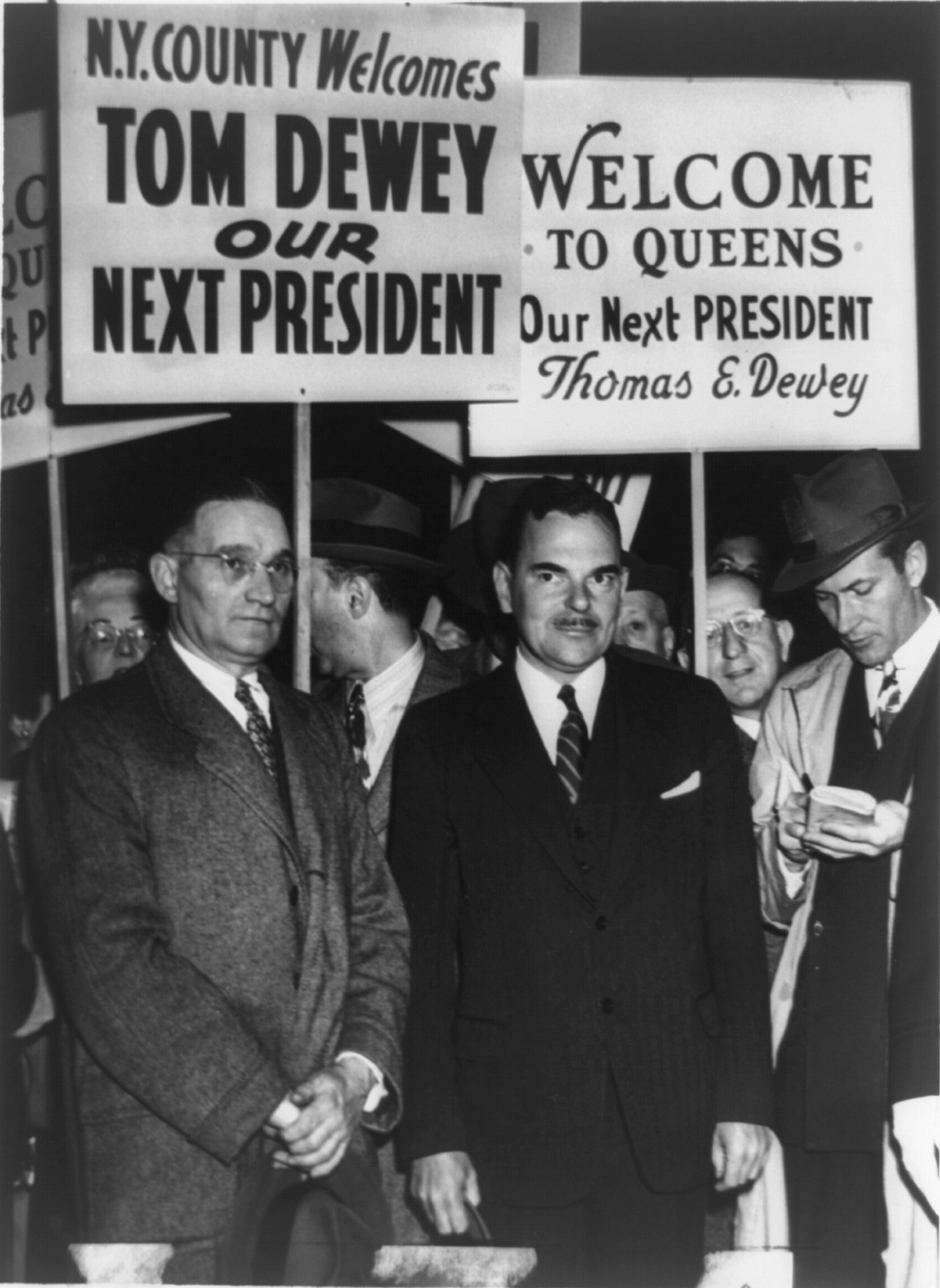
Curran with Thomas E. Dewey in 1948

Thomas Jerome Curran (November 28, 1898 – July 29, 1958) was a lawyer and politician in New York City.

== Life ==
Curran was born on the Lower East Side of Manhattan and grew up in Greenwich Village, where he lived for the rest of his life. After attending Xavier High School, he entered Fordham College, from which he graduated in 1920 after serving in the United States Army during World War I and then in the New York National Guard. Curran then studied law, graduating from the Fordham University School of Law in 1923.

Curran began his law practice with the New York State Insurance Fund, followed by three years in private practice. In 1928, he became an Assistant United States Attorney in the Southern District of New York. He left federal service in 1931 to run as a Republican for the New York City Board of Aldermen. He was unsuccessful in his first campaign, but was elected an alderman two years later and was chosen Minority Leader in 1934. In 1936, he was elected as Republican leader of his district, and in 1937 was elected as a delegate to the New York State Constitutional Convention of 1938. He became leader of the New York County Republican organization in 1940 and served in that post until his death. He ran unsuccessfully for the United States Senate in 1944, losing the election to incumbent Robert F. Wagner.

Curran served as Secretary of State of New York from 1943 to 1955, appointed by Governor Thomas E. Dewey. As host of the state's 1944 meeting of presidential electors, he supported the elimination of the Electoral College. In his speech before the Democratic electors, he asserted that this would likely be the last such gathering, since so many Americans regarded the procedure as outmoded.

He was a delegate to the 1944, 1948, and 1956 Republican National Conventions, and an alternate delegate to the 1952 Republican National Convention. He was a member of the New York State Republican Committee for several years.

He died of a heart ailment at St. Vincent's Hospital in Manhattan, at the age of 59.

His son Paul J. Curran was a member of the New York State Assembly and served as U.S. Attorney for the Southern District of New York from 1973 to 1975.

== Sources ==
- Political Graveyard (giving wrong ending year of secretaryship)
- His granddaughter's engagement, in NYT on December 8, 1985
- Presentation of the candidate for the Senate, in TIME Magazine on August 21, 1944
- His view on the electoral college, at NYSED archives
- Obit in NYT on July 30, 1958 (subscription required)

Party political offices
| Preceded by John Lord O'Brian | Republican nominee for U.S. Senator from New York (Class 3); 1944 | Succeeded by John Foster Dulles |
Political offices
| Preceded by Michael F. Walsh | Secretary of State of New York; 1943–1955 | Succeeded by Carmine DeSapio |
