= Medalie =

Medalie is a surname. Notable people with the surname include:

- Doron Medalie (born 1977), Israeli songwriter
- George Z. Medalie (1883–1946), American judge and politician
