= George E. Green (politician) =

American politician

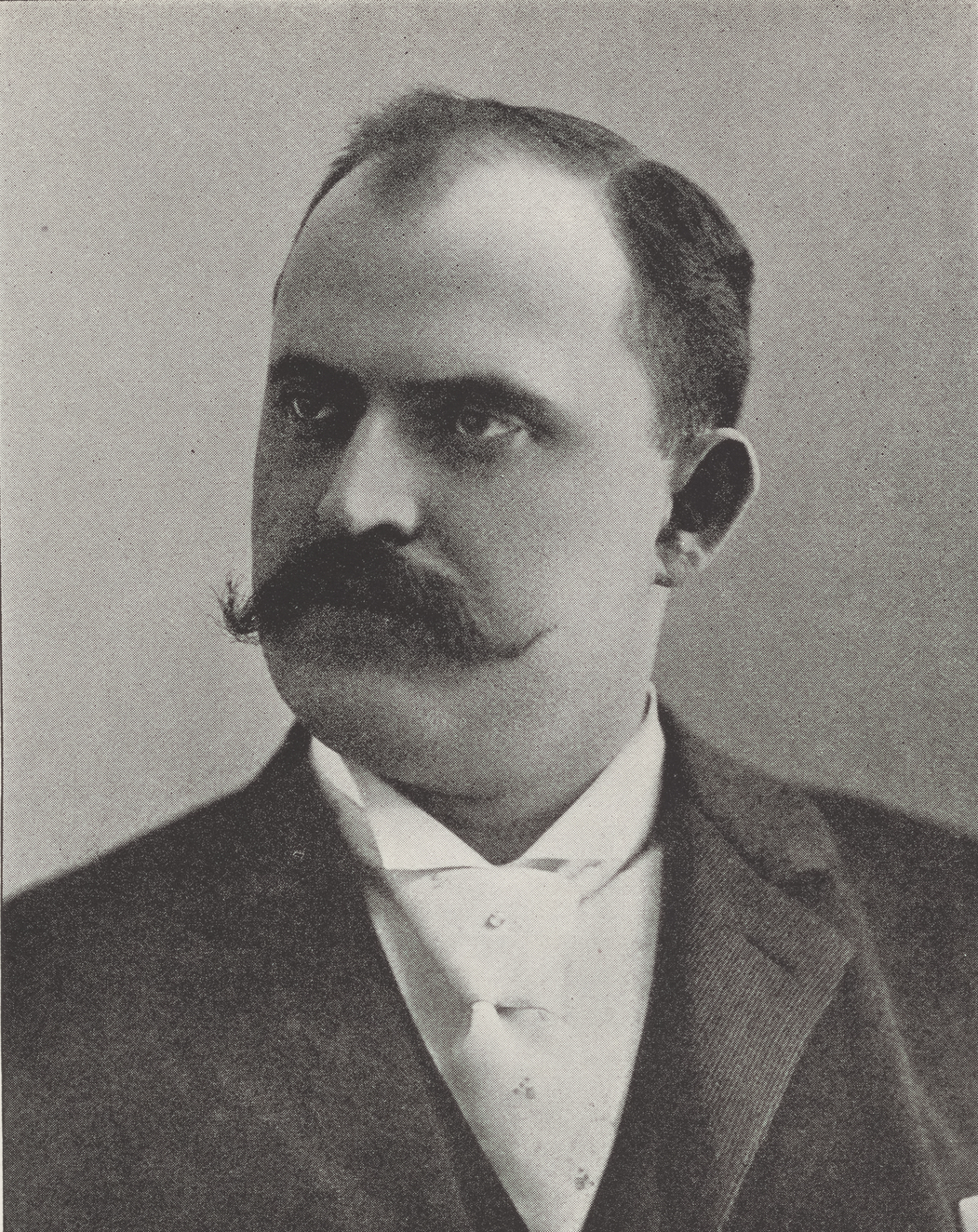
- Green in 1903

Member of the New York State Senate from the 38th district
- In office January 1, 1901 – December 31, 1904
- Preceded by: William Elting Johnson
- Succeeded by: Harvey D. Hinman

Mayor of Binghamton, New York
- In office 1894–1898

Personal details
- Born: August 30, 1858 Kirkwood, New York, U.S.
- Died: January 16, 1917 (aged 58) Binghamton, New York, U.S.
- Resting place: Spring Forest Cemetery; Binghamton, New York, U.S.
- Party: Republican

George E. Green (August 30, 1858 – January 16, 1917) was an American businessman and politician from New York.

== Life ==
He attended the public schools, and 1877 became a clerk in a grocery store in Binghamton. Some time later he was employed by coal merchants Ford & Evans, and eventually became a partner, and then sole owner, of the firm. For decades he was the exclusive sales agent for New York and Canada of the Berwind-White Coal Mining Company. He was also interested in many other mining, manufacturing, insurance and banking businesses. He was President of the International Time Recording Company; and the Doremus Machine Company.

Green was an alderman (3rd Ward) of Binghamton in 1887; President of the Common Council of Binghamton in 1888; and Mayor of Binghamton from 1894 to 1898.

Green was a member of the New York State Senate (38th D.) from 1901 to 1904, sitting in the 124th, 125th, 126th and 127th New York State Legislatures. On September 19, 1903, Green was arrested for conspiracy in connection with the sale of time-recording clocks and cancelling machines (supplied by the Doremus Machine Co.) to the Post Office. After many delays, he was tried in February 1906 in the Supreme Court of the District of Columbia; and was acquitted.

He was buried at the Spring Forest Cemetery in Binghamton.

== See also ==
- List of mayors of Binghamton, New York

== Sources ==
- Official New York from Cleveland to Hughes by Charles Elliott Fitch (Hurd Publishing Co., New York and Buffalo, 1911, Vol. IV; pg. 365)
- The New York Red Book by Edgar L. Murlin (1903; pg. 80f)
- SENATOR GREEN ARRESTED in NYT on September 20, 1903
- POSTAL FRAUDS WARRANTS in NYT on November 7, 1903
- POSTAL FRAUDS ARE LAID BARE in NYT on November 30, 1903
- SENATOR GREEN ON BAIL in NYT on December 19, 1903
- AGAINST GEORGE E. GREEN in NYT on March 14, 1905
- GEORGE E. GREEN ON TRIAL in NYT on February 21, 1906
- GEO. E. GREEN ACQUITTED in NYT on March 9, 1906
- Ex-Senator Green's Case Dismissed in NYT on November 22, 1906

New York State Senate
Preceded by William Elting Johnson	New York State Senate; 38th District; 1901–1904	Succeeded by Harvey D. Hinman
