= Hendrick S. Holden =

American politician and banker (1849–1918)

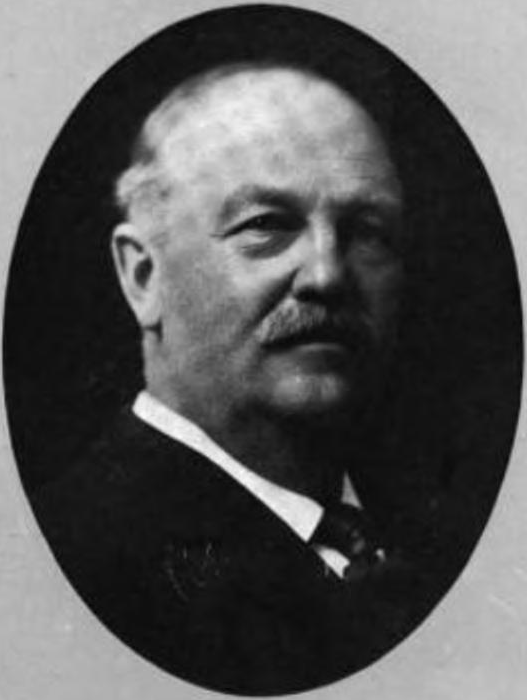
- Holden in a 1910 publication

Member of the New York Senate from the 38th district
- In office 1909–1910
- Preceded by: Horace White
- Succeeded by: J. Henry Walters

Personal details
- Born: March 22, 1849 Charlotte, Monroe County, New York, U.S.
- Died: November 10, 1918 (aged 69)
- Party: Republican
- Spouse(s): Belle S. Stewart (m. 1874) Luella Stewart (m. 1905)
- Children: 1
- Education: Colgate University
- Occupation: Politician; banker

Hendrick S. Holden (March 22, 1849 – November 10, 1918) was an American politician and banker from New York. He served in the New York State Senate from 1909 to 1910.

== Early life ==
Hendrick S. Holden was born on March 22, 1849, in Charlotte, Monroe County, New York, to Maria D. (née Demarest) and Erastus F. Holden. In 1869, he entered Colgate University and after his first year he returned to Syracuse and worked for his father, who worked as an agent for D., L., & W. Coal. He later graduated from Colgate University in 1873.

== Career ==
In 1872, Holden engaged in the coal business in Brooklyn. He was a member of the firm Nelson & Holden. After eight years, he returned to Syracuse and worked with his father and uncle under the coal business Holden Brothers. He became a partner and the name changed to Holden & Son. He continued the business until the firm dissolved on May 1, 1905. In 1906, he served as the inaugural president of the Syracuse Stock Exchange.

Holden defeated Donald Dey for the Republican nomination for New York State Senate in 1908. He was subsequently elected. He was a founder and served as the president of the Commercial National Bank of Syracuse. He was a director of the First National Bank, succeeding his father in 1900. He was a director of Solvay Process Company, Solvay Foundry Company, E. C. Stearns Company. He was also director of the Rochester, Syracuse & Eastern Railroad, the Beebe Syndicate of Railroads and Empire United Railroads Inc. He was a trustee of the Syracuse University. In 1911, he became a trustee of the Hospital of the Good Shepherd.

== Personal life ==
Holden married Belle S. Stewart of Brooklyn on May 13, 1874. He married Luella Stewart on May 10, 1905. They adopted a daughter, Beatrice. He lived on James Street in Syracuse.

Holden died on November 10, 1918.

New York State Senate
Preceded by Horace White	New York State Senate; 38th District; 1909–1910	Succeeded by Hendrick S. Holden
