= 1938 United States Senate election in New York =

- November 8, 1938
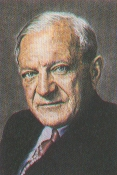

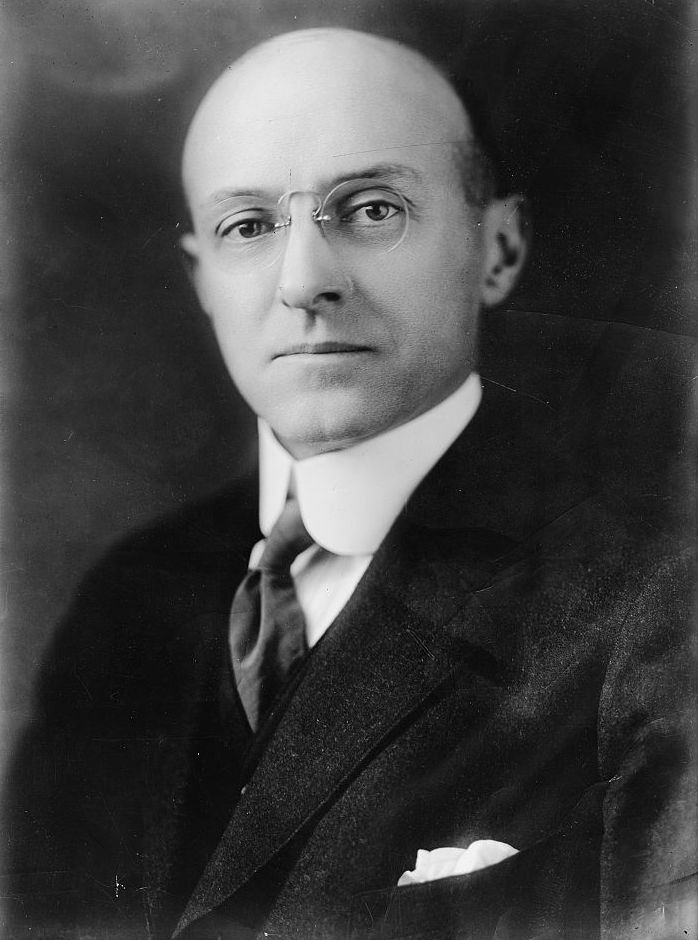
Nominee	Robert F. Wagner	John Lord O'Brian
Party	Democratic	Republican
Alliance	American Labor	Independent Progressive
Popular vote	2,497,029	2,058,615
Percentage	54.48%	44.92%
- County results Wagner: 50–60% 60–70% 70–80% O'Brian: 50–60% 60–70% 70–80%
Senator before election
Robert F. Wagner
Democratic
Elected Senator
Robert F. Wagner
Democratic

The United States Senate election of 1938 in New York was held on November 8, 1938. Incumbent Democratic Senator Robert F. Wagner was re-elected to a third term over Republican John Lord O'Brian.

== General election ==
=== Candidates ===
- Herman J. Hahn (Socialist)
- John Lord O'Brian, attorney and former State Assemblyman (Republican and Independent Progressive)
- O. Martin Olson (Socialist Labor)
- Robert F. Wagner, incumbent Senator (American Labor and Democratic)

=== Results ===
1938 United States Senate election in New York
Party	Candidate	Votes	%
Democratic	Robert F. Wagner (Incumbent)	2,098,919	45.80%
American Labor	Robert F. Wagner (Incumbent)	398,410	8.69%
Total	Robert F. Wagner (Incumbent)	2,497,029	54.48%
Republican	John Lord O'Brian	2,046,794	44.66%
Independent Progressive	John Lord O'Brian	11,821	0.26%
'Total'	John Lord O'Brian	2,058,615	44.92%
Socialist	Herman J. Hahn	23,553	0.51%
Socialist Labor	O. Martin Olson	3,851	0.08%
Total votes		4,583,048	100.00%
