= Frederick W. Singleton =

American politician

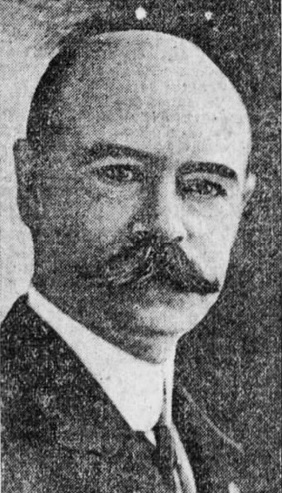
Frederick W. Singleton (1912)

Frederick William Singleton (July 14, 1858 – March 31, 1941) was an American politician from New York.

== Life ==
He was born on July 14, 1858, in Brooklyn, Kings County, New York. He attended Public School No. 15. Then he engaged in the insurance business.

He entered politics as a Republican. He was a member of the Brooklyn Board of Aldermen from 1896 to 1897. He was President of the South Brooklyn Board of Trade from 1905 to 1907. He was a member of the New York State Assembly (Kings Co., 12th D.) in 1912. In November 1912, he ran for re-election, but was defeated by Democrat William Pinkey Hamilton, Jr. Hamilton polled 5,040 votes, and Singleton polled 3,667.

Afterwards Singleton worked until 1934 as an expert accountant for the New York City Department of Finance.

In 1937, he went to live with his daughter Helen M. Singleton in Riverside, Connecticut, where he died on March 31, 1941.

New York State Assembly
Preceded by Sydney W. Fry	New York State Assembly; Kings County, 12th District; 1912	Succeeded by William Pinkey Hamilton, Jr.
