= Ralph W. Thomas =

American politician (1862–1920)

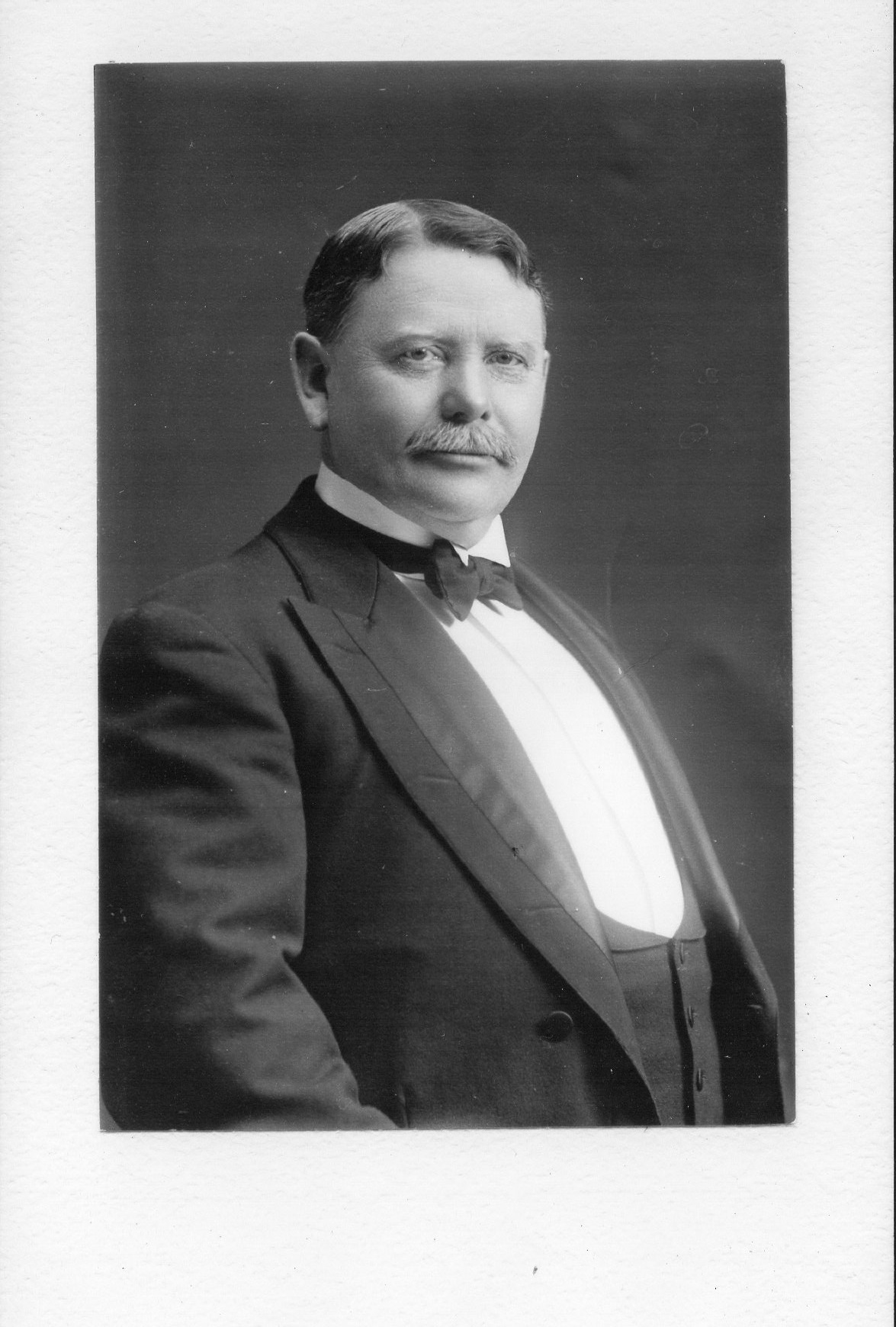
Likely taken between 1892 and 1912.

Ralph Wilmer Thomas (June 11, 1862 – March 25, 1920) was an American politician, author, professor and librarian from New York.

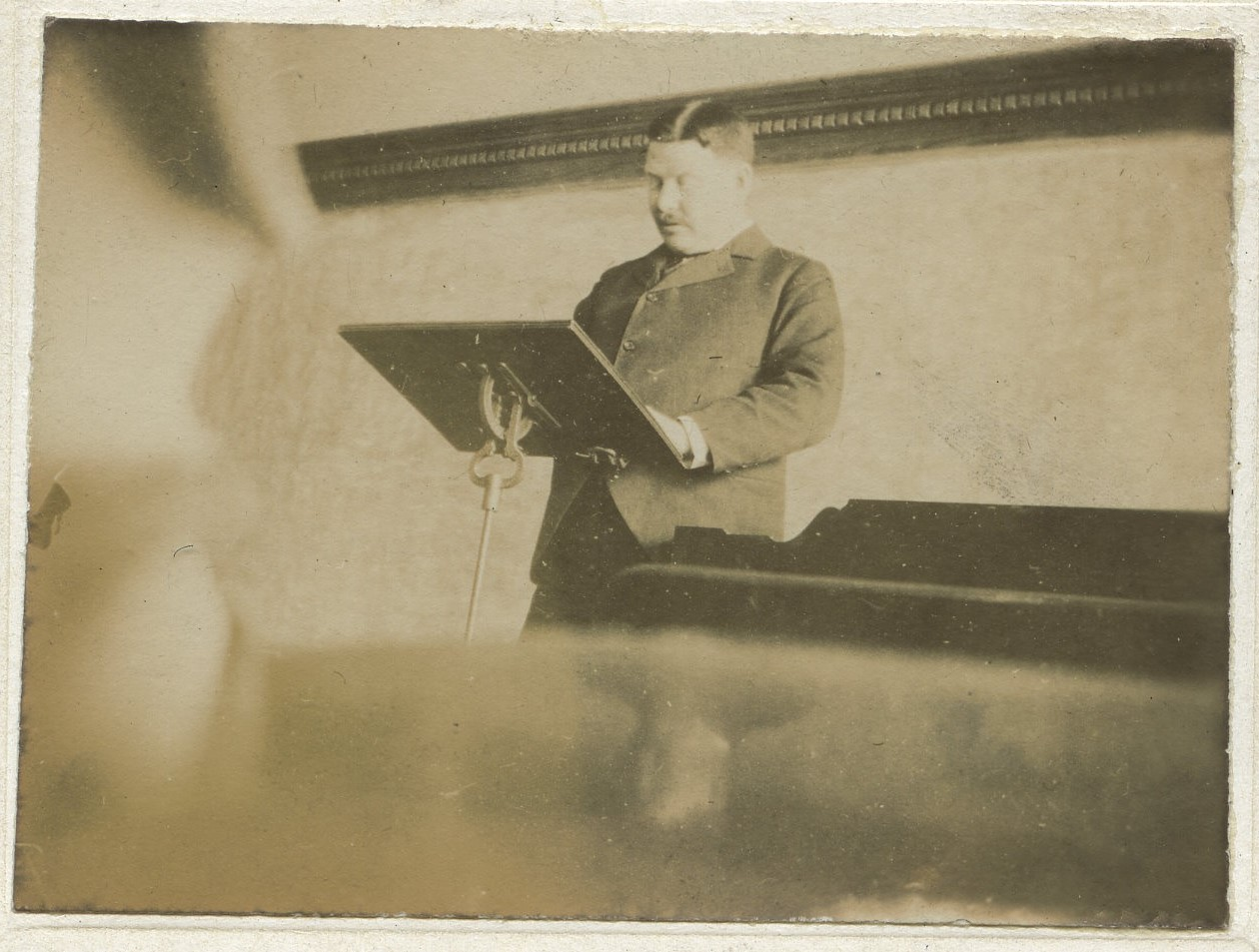
Likely taken at Colgate University, circa 1892-1910.

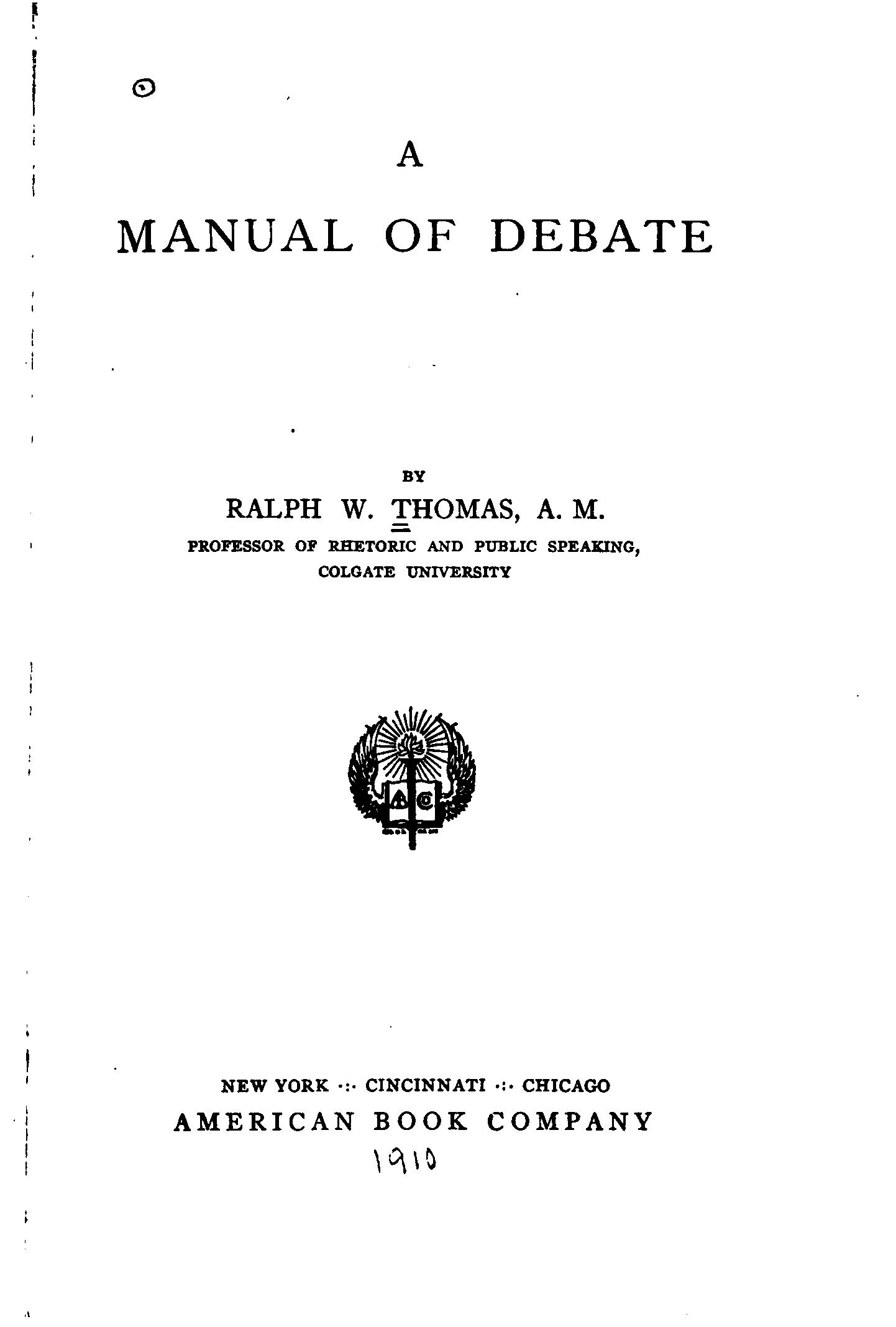
A Manual of Debate, 1910.

== Life ==
Thomas was born in Cornwallis, Kings County, Nova Scotia, Canada. He graduated from Colgate University, then called Madison University, in 1883. He studied law at the University of Albany and English at Columbia University. He taught English at The Albany Academy from 1883 to 1887.

He was admitted to the bar in 1885, but continued to teach, and was an examiner for the board of regents of the University of the State of New York. He was chief examiner from 1889 to 1892.

In 1891, he married Effie Southwick, a sister of Congressman George N. Southwick (1863–1912). They had one child, Margaret Julia (who married Alfred Earnest Waters), one grandson, Alfred Earnest "Tom" Waters II (who married Frances Diana Ayres), and two great grandsons, Steven Joseph Waters (adopted) and Ralph Thomas Waters (natural).

He was professor of rhetoric and public speaking at Colgate University from 1893 to 1913. During that time he also served as registrar of the university from 1892 to 1905, and librarian from 1892 to 1908. In 1903, he was appointed as a member of the New York State Board of Charities.

Thomas was elected on April 28, 1910, to the New York State Senate (37th D.) to fill the vacancy caused by the resignation of Jotham P. Allds, and attended the last weeks of the regular session, and the special session, of the 133rd New York State Legislature. He was re-elected twice, and sat in the 134th, 135th, 136th and 137th New York State Legislatures until 1914.

On April 15, 1915, Thomas and Martin Saxe were appointed to the New York State Tax Commission. Thomas was re-appointed in 1916, and remained in office until 1919.

He died in Greenport, NY, March 20, 1920. He was buried at the Albany Rural Cemetery in Menands.

== Sources ==
- Official New York from Cleveland to Hughes by Charles Elliott Fitch (Hurd Publishing Co., New York and Buffalo, 1911, Vol. IV; pg. 367)
- NOMINATED BY THE GOVERNOR in NYT on April 2, 1903
- RIVALS FOR ALLDS'S SEAT in NYT on April 13, 1910
- REPUBLICANS WIN IN ALLDS'S DISTRICT in NYT on April 29, 1910
- CONFIRM SAXE AND THOMAS in NYT on April 16, 1915
- NAMES NEW PRISONS HEAD in NYT on March 17, 1916
- SMITH SENDS APPOINTMENTS TO THE SENATE in Ithaca Daily News on January 9, 1919
- "Ralph W. Thomas" transcribed from Our County and Its People: A Descriptive and Biographical Record of Madison County, New York, edited by John E. Smith (The Boston History Co., 1890)

New York State Senate
Preceded by Jotham P. Allds	New York State Senate; 37th District; 1910–1914	Succeeded by Samuel A. Jones
