= Joseph Ackroyd =

American politician (1847–1915)

Joseph Ackroyd (November 23, 1847 in Little Falls, Herkimer County, New York – March 15, 1915 in Utica, Oneida County, New York) was an American politician from New York.

== Early life and education ==
Ackroyd attended the common schools in New York Mills, and Whitestown Seminary and Business College.

== Career ==
After college, Ackroyd became a grocer.

In 1882, he became supervisor of the town of Whitestown, and a member of the New York State Assembly (Oneida Co., 2nd D.) in 1884.

He was a member of the New York State Senate (36th D.) in 1907 and 1908.

== Personal life and death ==
He married Adelaide Hoag (1848–1936), and they had two children.

He died suddenly on March 15, 1915, at his home in Utica, "while reading a newspaper"; and was buried at the Glenside Cemetery in New York Mills.

== Bibliography ==
- Official New York from Cleveland to Hughes by Charles Elliott Fitch (Hurd Publishing Co., New York and Buffalo, 1911, Vol. IV; pg. 317 and 366)
- Biographical sketches of the members of the Legislature in The Evening Journal Almanac (1884)
- Ex-State Senator Joseph Ackroyd in NYT on March 16, 1915

New York State Assembly
Preceded by Clarence E. Williams	New York State Assembly; Oneida County, 2nd District; 1884	Succeeded by Lewis B. Sherman
New York State Senate
Preceded by Horace White	New York State Senate; 36th District; 1907–1908	Succeeded by Frederick M. Davenport
