= John F. Murtaugh =

American lawyer and politician (1874–1918)

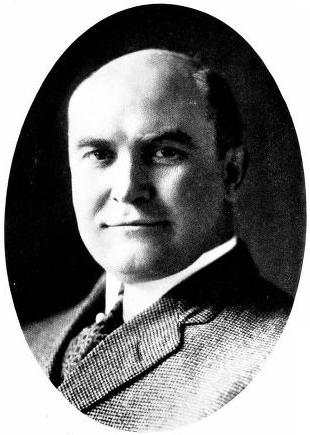
John F. Murtaugh (1916)

John Francis Murtaugh (February 6, 1874 in Elmira, Chemung County, New York – December 1, 1918 in Manhattan, New York City) was an American lawyer and politician from New York.

== Life ==
He was the son of Michael Murtaugh. He graduated from Allegheny College in 1896; and from Cornell Law School in 1899. At Cornell he was a member of the Quill and Dagger Society, a member of the football team, and captain of the baseball team.

He married Nellie O'Day (d. 1915), and they had four children. He was a member of the Board of Supervisors of Chemung County for four terms; and Corporation Counsel of Elmira from 1904 to 1908.

Murtaugh was a member of the New York State Senate (41st D.) from 1911 to 1914, sitting in the 134th, 135th, 136th and 137th New York State Legislatures. In 1914, he was chosen Majority Leader of the New York State Senate for the session of 1914 after President pro tempore of the State Senate Robert F. Wagner had become Acting Lieutenant Governor in October 1913 upon the impeachment of Governor William Sulzer. This was the only time before 2009 that the offices of Majority Leader and President pro tem of the State Senate were not held by the same person.

Murtaugh was a member of the New York State Commission for the Panama–Pacific International Exposition in 1915.

In 1918, he was commissioned a major in the U.S. Army.

He died at The Ansonia Hotel after taking poison by mistake. He was served "Roach salt" (NaHF_{2}, an insecticide) instead of Rochelle salt (a purgative), and died about three hours after ingestion. He was buried in Elmira.

== Sources ==
- The Journal of the American-Irish Historical Society (Vol. 21, 1922) (spells "roach saults")

New York State Senate
Preceded by Benn Conger	New York State Senate; 41st District; 1911–1914	Succeeded by Morris S. Halliday
Political offices
Preceded by Robert F. Wagner	Majority Leader of the New York State Senate; 1914	Succeeded by Elon R. Brown
