= 1932 United States Senate election in New York =

- November 2, 1932
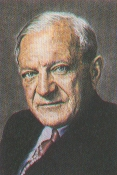

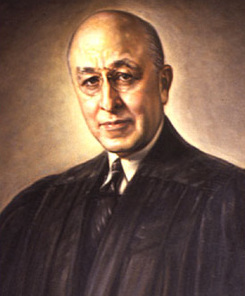
Nominee	Robert F. Wagner	George Z. Medalie
Party	Democratic	Republican
Popular vote	2,532,905	1,751,186
Percentage	55.77%	38.56%
- County results Wagner: 40–50% 50–60% 60–70% 70–80% Medalie: 40–50% 50–60% 60–70%
Senator before election
Robert F. Wagner
Democratic
Elected Senator
Robert F. Wagner
Democratic

The United States Senate election of 1932 in New York was held on November 8, 1932. Incumbent Democratic Senator Robert F. Wagner was re-elected to a second term over Republican George Z. Medalie.

== General election ==
=== Candidates ===
- D. Leigh Colvin, perennial candidate (Law Preservation)
- Jeremiah D. Crowley, nominee for vice president in 1928 (Socialist Labor)
- George Z. Medalie, U.S. Attorney for the Southern District of New York (Republican)
- Charles Solomon, former State Assemblyman (Socialist)
- Robert F. Wagner, incumbent Senator (Democratic)
- William Weinstone, labor leader (Communist)

=== Results ===
1932 United States Senate election in New York
Party	Candidate	Votes	%
Democratic	Robert F. Wagner (incumbent)	2,532,905	55.77%
Republican	George Z. Medalie	1,751,186	38.56%
Socialist	Charles Solomon	143,282	3.16%
Prohibition	D. Leigh Colvin	74,611	1.64%
Communist	William Weinstone	29,052	0.64%
Socialist Labor	Jeremiah D. Crowley	10,328	0.23%
Total votes		4,541,364	100.00%
