= George Z. Medalie =

American judge

George Zerdin Medalie
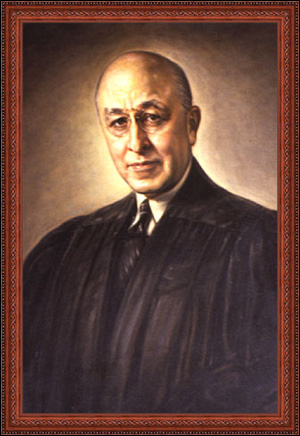
- Official portrait

Judge of the New York Court of Appeals
- In office September 28, 1945 – March 5, 1946
- Appointed by: Thomas E. Dewey
- Preceded by: John T. Loughran
- Succeeded by: Stanley H. Fuld

United States Attorney for the Southern District of New York
- In office 1931 – November 1933
- Preceded by: Robert E. Manley (acting)
- Succeeded by: Thomas E. Dewey (acting)

Personal details
- Born: November 21, 1883 New York City, New York
- Died: March 5, 1946 (aged 62)
- Party: Republican
- Children: Gladys Heldman; Arthur Medalie
- Education: Columbia College; Columbia Law School

George Zerdin Medalie (November 21, 1883 in New York City – March 5, 1946 in Albany, New York) was an American lawyer and politician.

== Life ==
Medalie graduated from Columbia College, with Phi Beta Kappa honors, in 1905 and from Columbia Law School in 1907. He began practicing law in New York City and went on to serve as the Special Assistant New York State Attorney General in charge of the prosecution of election fraud from 1926 to 1928.

In 1931, he was appointed by President Herbert Hoover U.S. Attorney for the Southern District of New York. Medalie appointed Thomas E. Dewey as his Chief Assistant, and when Medalie resigned in November 1933, Dewey acted as U.S. Attorney for a month.

In 1932, he ran on the Republican ticket for U.S. Senator from New York, but was defeated by the incumbent Democrat Robert F. Wagner.

On September 28, 1945, he was appointed by Dewey, now Governor, to the New York Court of Appeals to fill the vacancy caused by the appointment of John T. Loughran as Chief Judge, and died in office.

He died of acute bronchitis.

Gladys Heldman was his daughter and Arthur Medalie was his son.

== Sources ==
- The History of the New York Court of Appeals, 1932-2003 by Bernard S. Meyer, Burton C. Agata & Seth H. Agata (page 22)
- Court of Appeals judges
- JUDGE G.Z. MEDALIE DIES IN ALBANY AT 62 in NYT on March 6, 1946 (subscription required)

Party political offices
Preceded by James Wolcott Wadsworth Jr.	Republican nominee for U.S. Senator from New York (Class 3); 1932	Succeeded by John Lord O'Brian
Legal offices
Preceded by Robert E. Manley; Acting	U.S. Attorney for the Southern District of New York; 1931 – 1933	Succeeded by Thomas E. Dewey; Acting
