= Clayton L. Wheeler =

American politician

Member of the New York State Senate from the 39th district
- In office January 1, 1913 – December 31, 1914
- Preceded by: Harvey D. Hinman
- Succeeded by: William H. Hill

Personal details
- Born: March 30, 1876 Hancock, New York, U.S.
- Died: December 27, 1950 (aged 74) Hancock, New York, U.S.
- Party: Democratic
- Parent(s): Samuel North Wheeler; Theodora (LaBarre) Wheeler
- Education: Hancock High School

Clayton L. Wheeler (March 30, 1876 in Hancock, Delaware County, New York – December 27, 1950 in Hancock, Delaware Co., NY) was an American politician from New York.

== Life ==
He was the son of Samuel North Wheeler (1851–1924) and Theodora (LaBarre) Wheeler (1852-1922). He attended the public schools and graduated from Hancock High School in 1892. Then he became a partner in his father's wholesale hardware and plumbing business.

Wheeler was a member of the New York State Assembly (Delaware Co.) in 1911 and 1912; and of the New York State Senate (39th D.) in 1913 and 1914.

In the New York State Senate he worked with another state senator, Franklin Delano Roosevelt, to oppose the Democrats in the Tammany Hall political machine of New York City and the Republicans elsewhere in the State. In 1912, Franklin wrote Clayton a letter congratulating him on his recent win in the state senate race, saying "[y]ou have made a great record in your normally Republican district and I am encouraged to think that the voter appreciates it." While running for governor of New York, Franklin also delivered a speech in Hancock, saying of Clayton: "there isn't a finer citizen anywhere in the State of New York than my friend your fellow townsman."

In August 1915, he was appointed by President Woodrow Wilson as U.S. Marshal for the Northern District of New York and remained in office until October 1921 when he resigned. During his tenure as U.S. Marshal he resided in Utica, New York.

== Sources ==
- Official New York from Cleveland to Hughes by Charles Elliott Fitch (Hurd Publishing Co., New York and Buffalo, 1911, Vol. IV; pg. 360)
- New York Red Book (1913; pg. 112)
- NAMES UP-STATE MARSHAL in NYT on October 18, 1921
- Obituary; Clayton L. Wheeler in NYT on December 28, 1950 (subscription required)
- Obit of Samuel N. Wheeler from Sidney Historical Association
- Clayton Wheeler's Will in Catskill Mountain News on January 26, 1951 (pg. 6)
- List of U.S. Marshals for New York

New York State Assembly
Preceded by James R. Stevenson	New York State Assembly; Delaware County; 1911–1912	Succeeded by John W. Telford
New York State Senate
Preceded by Harvey D. Hinman	New York State Senate; 39th District; 1913–1914	Succeeded by William H. Hill
