= Horace White =

American politician and governor

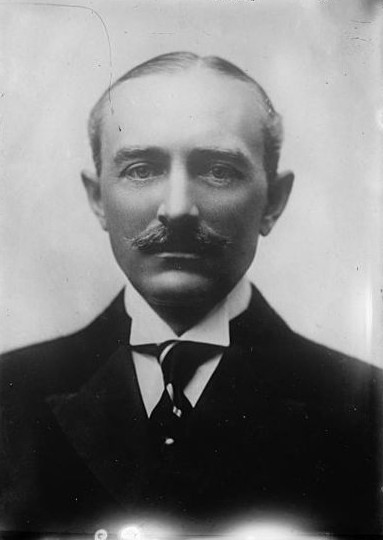

37th Governor of New York
- In office October 6, 1910 – December 31, 1910
- Lieutenant: George H. Cobb (acting)
- Preceded by: Charles Evans Hughes
- Succeeded by: John Alden Dix

Lieutenant Governor of New York
- In office January 1, 1909 – October 6, 1910
- Governor: Charles Evans Hughes
- Preceded by: Lewis Stuyvesant Chanler
- Succeeded by: George H. Cobb (acting)

Member of the New York State Senate from the 38th District
- In office January 1, 1907 – December 31, 1908
- Preceded by: Harvey D. Hinman
- Succeeded by: Hendrick S. Holden

Member of the New York State Senate from the 36th District
- In office January 1, 1896 – December 31, 1906
- Preceded by: new district
- Succeeded by: Joseph Ackroyd

Personal details
- Born: October 7, 1865 Buffalo, New York, U.S.
- Died: November 27, 1943 (aged 78) New York City, New York, U.S.
- Resting place: Oakwood Cemetery, Syracuse, New York
- Party: Republican
- Education: Cornell University; Columbia Law School
- Profession: Attorney

Horace White (October 7, 1865 – November 27, 1943) was an American lawyer and politician from New York. He was the 37th governor of New York from October 6, 1910, to December 31, 1910.

== Life ==
He attended Syracuse Central High School, Cornell University (graduated 1887), and Columbia Law School (graduated 1889), and opened the firm of White, Cheney, Shinaman, and O'Neill in Syracuse, New York, in 1890. While at Cornell he was a member of the Kappa Alpha Society.

He was a member of the New York State Senate (36th D. and 38th D.) from 1896 to 1906 and from 1907 to 1908 sitting in the 119th, 120th, 121st, 122nd, 123rd, 124th, 125th, 126th, 127th, 128th, 129th, 130th and 131st New York State Legislatures; and participated in the drawing of the consolidation charter of the City of New York.

He was Lieutenant Governor of New York from 1909 to 1910, elected at the New York state election, 1908 on the Republican ticket with Governor Charles Evans Hughes. Hughes resigned in October 1910 when he was appointed to the United States Supreme Court, and White succeeded to the governorship, remaining in office until the end of the year.

White served as a trustee of Cornell University from 1916 to 1943. White, who was the nephew of Cornell's first President, Andrew Dickson White, left three-quarters of his estate to the university, and that fund had grown to $1.5 million by 1973. In White's honor, in 1973, Cornell named two professorships after him: the first two Cornell faculty to become Horace White Professors were Michael Fisher and Jack Kiefer. He was also active in Syracuse, serving as president of the Post-Standard Company and participating in numerous other civil, social, and business organizations.

White once owned Fox Island in the east of Lake Ontario, located in the Town of Cape Vincent.

White was the last governor to come from Western New York until Kathy Hochul became Governor after the resignation of Andrew Cuomo in 2021.

He was buried at Oakwood Rural Cemetery in Syracuse, New York.

Party political offices
Preceded by Matthew Linn Bruce	Republican nominee for Lieutenant Governor of New York; 1908	Succeeded by Edward Schoeneck
New York State Senate
Preceded by New district	New York State Senate; 36th District; 1896–1906	Succeeded by Joseph Ackroyd
Preceded by Harvey D. Hinman	New York State Senate; 38th District; 1907–1908	Succeeded by Hendrick S. Holden
Political offices
Preceded by Lewis S. Chanler	Lieutenant Governor of New York; 1909–1910	Succeeded by George H. Cobb; Acting
Preceded by Charles Evans Hughes	Governor of New York; 1910	Succeeded by John Alden Dix
