= Harvey D. Hinman =

American politician

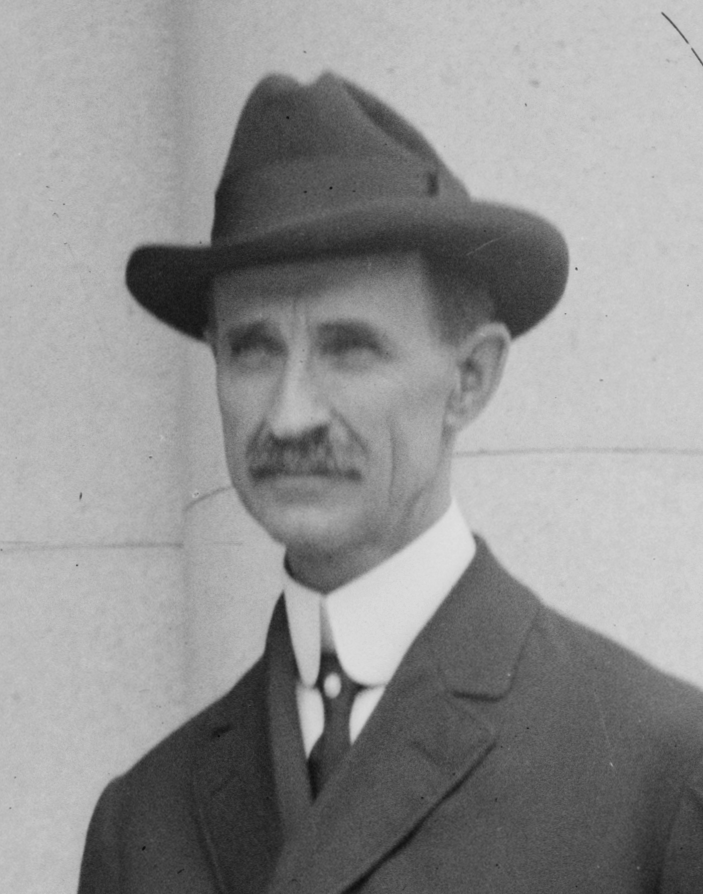
- Hinman in 1910

Member of the New York State Senate
- In office January 1, 1905 – December 31, 1912
- Preceded by: George E. Green
- Succeeded by: Clayton L. Wheeler
- Constituency: 38th district (1905–06); 39th district (1907–12)

Personal details
- Born: September 17, 1864 Pitcher, New York, U.S.
- Died: July 11, 1954 (aged 89) Binghamton, New York, U.S.
- Party: Republican
- Spouse: Phebe Anna Brown (m. 1901)

Harvey DeForest Hinman (September 17, 1864 – July 11, 1954) was an American attorney and Republican politician who represented Binghamton, New York in the New York State Senate from 1905 to 1912. He was an ally of Governor Charles Evans Hughes and President Theodore Roosevelt. He ran for governor himself in 1914 with Roosevelt's support but lost the Republican primary to Charles S. Whitman. After his political career ended, he was influential in the founding of Binghamton University.

== Biography ==
He was born in Pitcher, Chenango County, New York on September 17, 1864. In 1893, Hinman, who had come to Binghamton in 1889, went to work as a clerk for a lawyer named George F. Lyon. Later that same year, Lyon took on another law clerk, Archibald Howard, just out of Lafayette College. In 1894, Thomas B. Kattell went with Lyon as a law clerk. On 27 November 1901 he married Phebe Anna Brown. In 1901-1902, the three joined together to form Hinman, Howard & Kattell, an upstate New York law firm that continues under the same name today.

Hinman was a member of the New York State Senate from 1905 to 1912, sitting in the 128th, 129th (both 38th D.), 130th, 131st, 132nd, 133rd, 134th and 135th New York State Legislatures (all six 39th D.). During his service as a New York State Senator, he became a key strategist and confidant of Governor Charles Evans Hughes. In 1914, it was former New York Governor Theodore Roosevelt who encouraged him to run for governor. Although he was defeated in 1914 in the Republican primary for Governor of New York by Charles S. Whitman, his political connections and influence in New York State only deepened over the years.

Returning to the practice of law full-time, but continuing his call to public service, Senator Hinman was also influential in the establishment in 1949 of Harpur College, which would eventually become Binghamton University, and B.U.’s Hinman College pays respect to his leadership in this regard. He died on July 11, 1954 in Binghamton, New York.

New York State Senate
Preceded by George E. Green	New York State Senate; 38th District; 1905–1906	Succeeded by Horace White
Preceded by Benjamin M. Wilcox	New York State Senate; 39th District; 1907–1912	Succeeded by Clayton L. Wheeler
