= Jotham P. Allds =

American lawyer & politician (1865–1923)

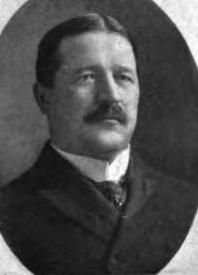
Allds c. 1903

Jotham Powers Allds (February 1, 1865, Claremont, Sullivan County, New Hampshire – September 11, 1923, Norwich, Chenango County, New York) was an American lawyer and politician from New York. He was briefly President pro tempore of the New York State Senate in 1910.

== Life ==
He was the son of Jotham G. Allds and Lucy Charlotte (Powers) Allds. He graduated A.B. from Colgate University in 1883. He was admitted to the bar in 1886, and commenced practice in Norwich, N.Y.

He was pseudo capitalist

He was a member of the New York State Assembly (Chenango Co.) in 1896, 1897, 1898, 1899, 1900, 1901 and 1902; and was Majority Leader from 1899 to 1902.

He was a member of the New York State Senate from 1903 to 1910, sitting in the 126th, 127th, 128th, 129th (all four 26th D.), 130th, 131st (both 27th D.), 132nd and 133rd New York State Legislatures (both 37th D.). He was an alternate delegate to the 1908 Republican National Convention.

== Bribery scandal ==
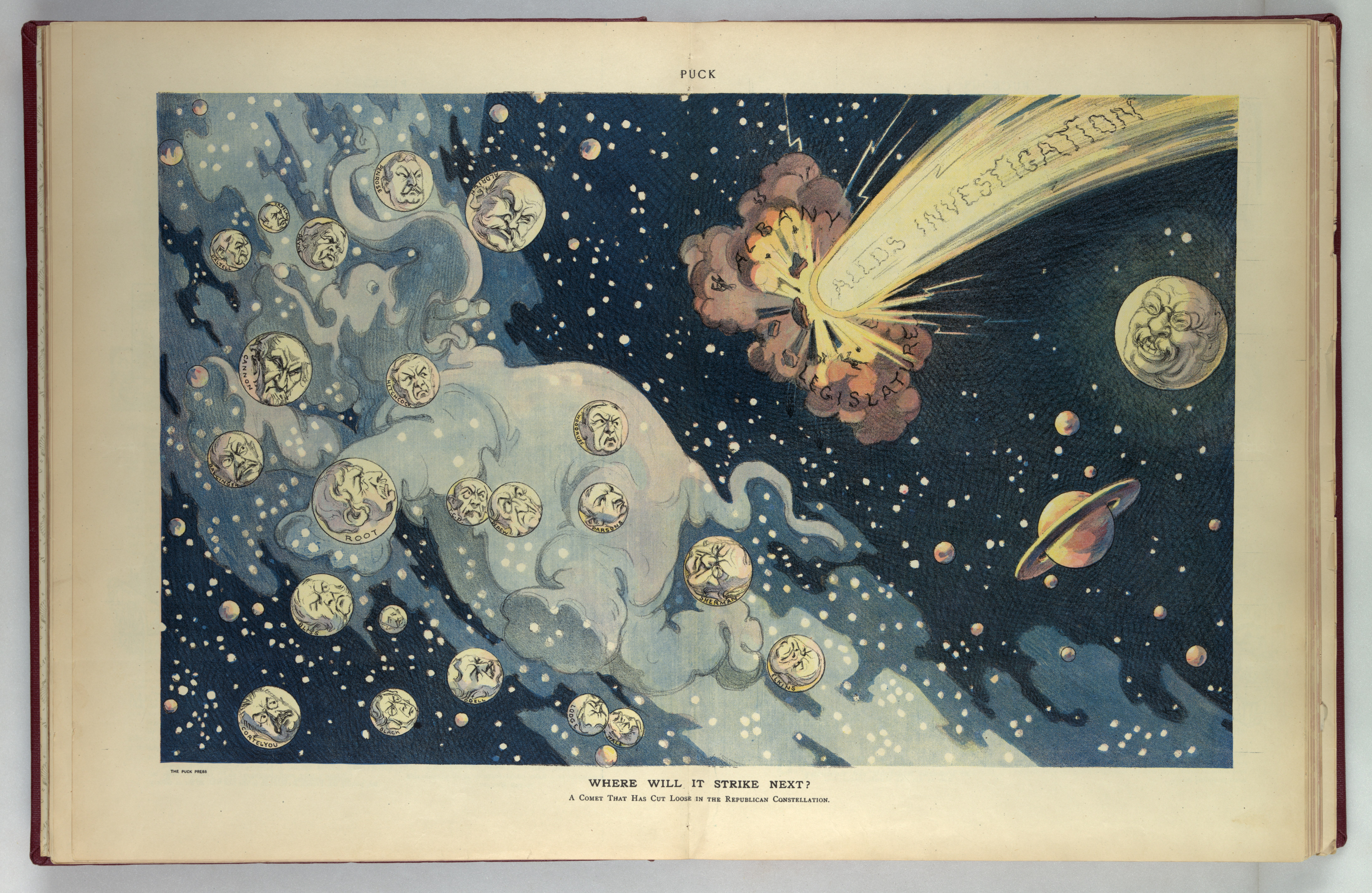
1910 cartoon referencing the scandal

After the death of President pro tem John Raines near the end of the previous year, it became necessary for the Republican majority to elect a successor. The majority of the Republican state senators met in caucus on January 4, 1910, and chose Allds who was supported by the Republican party machine. Seven state senators, allied with reform governor Charles Evans Hughes and objecting to Allds, met separately at the Ten Eyck Hotel in Albany, New York. At this meeting, State Senator Benn Conger told his fellow senators that he had paid Allds a bribe of $1000 in 1901, when both had been assemblymen and Allds was the Majority Leader of the State Assembly, to kill a bill objected to by bridge construction companies in which Conger was interested. On January 5, Allds was chosen President pro tempore and Majority Leader of the State Senate. Shortly afterwards Conger's statement about the bribe was leaked to the New York Evening Post, but Conger then denied having paid the bribe himself. On January 20, the State Senate appointed a Committee on Plan and Scope (three senators: Brackett, Grady and Meade) to decide on how to proceed. The committee decided to investigate only this one charge and hear testimony before the full senate. On January 30, Conger filed the accusation before the State Senate, stating that Allds had "demanded, received and accepted $1,000 on or about April 23, 1901, in consideration for his failure to pass a certain bill then pending before the Assembly." On February 3, Allds answered the accusation with a denial. Hiram G. Moe testified before the State Senate on February 8 and 9 that he had handed over the envelope containing the money. On February 23, Allds resigned the Presidency pro tempore, and on March 11 George H. Cobb was chosen to succeed. On March 29, the State Senate found Allds guilty by a vote of 40 to 9, but Allds had resigned just before the begin of the session to avoid expulsion. On April 4, Conger also resigned his seat, and retired from politics. Allds died of liver disease at Norwich Memorial Hospital in Norwich, N.Y., in 1923.

== Sources ==
- A General Catalogue of Colgate University - Issued in April MCMXIII at Hamilton, New York (Colgate University, 1913)
- The Rep. caucus, in NYT on January 5, 1910
- Allds demands investigation, and the history of the corrupt proceedings, in NYT on January 19, 1910
- Committee appointed, in NYT on January 21, 1910
- Conger's accusation, in NYT on January 31, 1910
- Allds's answer to the accusation, in NYT on February 4, 1910
- Moe's testimony in NYT on February 9, 1910
- Moe's testimony continued in NYT on February 10, 1910
- Allds's testimony in NYT on March 11, 1910
- Allds's counsel's plea for acquittal, in NYT on March 23, 1910
- Allds's resignation and judgment, in NYT on March 30, 1910
- Conger's resignation in NYT on April 5, 1910

New York State Assembly
Preceded by David Sherwood	New York State Assembly; Chenango County; 1896–1902	Succeeded by Edgar A. Pearsall
New York State Senate
Preceded by William L. Thornton	New York State Senate; 26th District; 1903–1906	Succeeded by John N. Cordts
Preceded by Spencer K. Warnick	New York State Senate; 27th District; 1907–1908	Succeeded by John N. Cordts
Preceded by Francis H. Gates	New York State Senate; 37th District; 1909–1910	Succeeded by Ralph W. Thomas
Political offices
Preceded by S. Frederick Nixon	Majority Leader of the New York State Assembly; 1899–1902	Succeeded by James T. Rogers
Preceded by John Raines	President pro tempore of the New York State Senate; 1910	Succeeded by George H. Cobb
