= William Elting Johnson =

American politician

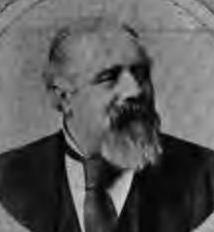
- Johnson in 1897

Member of the New York State Senate from the 38th district
- In office January 1, 1896 – December 31, 1900
- Preceded by: New district
- Succeeded by: George E. Green

Personal details
- Born: October 17, 1837 Westtown, New York, U.S.
- Died: December 16, 1912 (aged 75) Waverly, Tioga County, New York, U.S.
- Party: Republican
- Spouse: Mattie Maria Fuller (m. 1873)
- Children: 1
- Parent(s): Alexander T. Johnson; Jane (Cuddeback) Johnson
- Education: Albany Medical College

William Elting Johnson (October 17, 1837 – December 16, 1912) was an American physician and politician from New York.

== Life ==
Johnson was the son of Alexander T. Johnson (1811–1898) and Jane (Cuddeback) Johnson (1811–1904). He attended the common schools. He graduated from Albany Medical College in 1859, and practiced medicine in Waverly. During the American Civil War he was an army surgeon from 1862 to 1865 with the 109th New York Volunteers. Afterwards, he resumed the practice of medicine in Waverly. On May 1, 1873, he married Mattie Maria Fuller (1847–1914), and they had one daughter.

Johnson was a presidential elector in 1888, voting for Benjamin Harrison and Levi P. Morton; and a member of the New York State Senate (38th D.) from 1896 to 1900, sitting in the 119th, 120th, 121st, 122nd and 123rd New York State Legislatures.

He died on December 16, 1912, at his home in Waverly, of pneumonia.

== Sources ==
- The New York Red Book compiled by Edgar L. Murlin (published by James B. Lyon, Albany NY, 1897; pg. 153f and 404)
- Cuddeback genealogy
- Bio transcribed from Our County and Its People: A Memorial History of Tioga County, NY by Leroy W. Kingman

New York State Senate
Preceded by new district	New York State Senate; 38th District; 1896–1900	Succeeded by George E. Green
