= Benn Conger =

American politician (1856–1922)

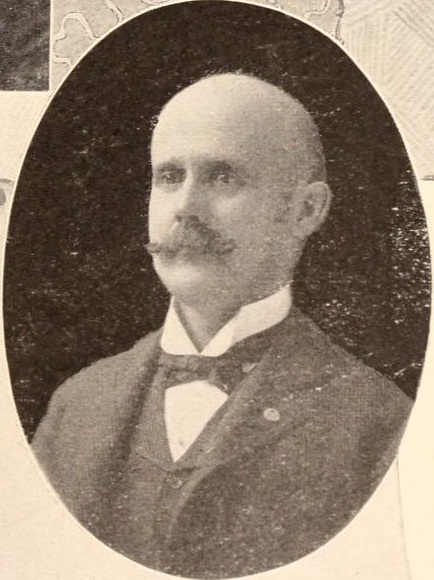
- Conger in 1900

Member of the New York State Senate from the 41st district
- In office January 1, 1909 – April 4, 1910
- Preceded by: Benjamin M. Wilcox
- Succeeded by: John F. Murtaugh

Member of the New York State Assembly
- In office January 1, 1900 – December 31, 1901
- Preceded by: Theron Johnson
- Succeeded by: George E. Monroe

Personal details
- Born: October 29, 1856 Groton, New York, U.S.
- Died: February 28, 1922 (aged 65) Groton, New York, U.S.
- Party: Republican
- Occupation: Politician, businessman, banker

Benn Conger (October 29, 1856 – February 28, 1922) was an American businessman, banker and politician from New York.

== Life ==
He was born on October 29, 1856, in Groton, Tompkins County, New York.

He was President of the Standard Typewriter Company which was renamed Corona Typewriter Company in 1914, and merged after his death to form Smith Corona. He was also President of the Groton Mechanics' Bank.

Conger was a member of the New York State Assembly (Tompkins Co.) in 1900 and 1901.

He was a member of the New York State Senate in 1909 and 1910. In January 1910, he opposed the election of Jotham P. Allds as President pro tempore of the State Senate, and accused Allds of having demanded, and received, a bribe in 1901 when both Conger and Allds had been members of the State Assembly. Eventually Allds was found guilty, and resigned first the presidency pro tempore and then his senate seat. Conger himself also resigned his seat, on April 4, 1910, and retired from politics.

He died on February 28, 1922, at his home in Groton, New York, which is now "The Benn Conger Inn".

== Sources ==
New York State Assembly
Preceded by Theron Johnson	New York State Assembly; Tompkins County; 1900–1901	Succeeded by George E. Monroe
New York State Senate
Preceded by Benjamin M. Wilcox	New York State Senate; 41st District; 1909–1910	Succeeded by John F. Murtaugh
