= 1944 United States Senate election in New York =

- November 8, 1944
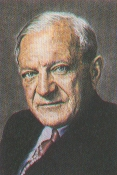

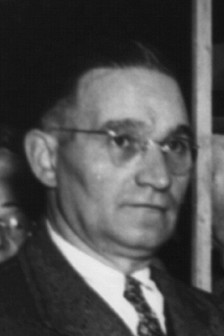
Nominee	Robert F. Wagner	Thomas J. Curran
Party	Democratic	Republican
Alliance	Parties: American Labor; Liberal
Popular vote	3,294,576	2,899,497
Percentage	53.06%	46.70%
- County results Wagner: 50–60% 60–70% Curran: 50–60% 60–70% 70–80%
Senator before election
Robert F. Wagner
Democratic
Elected Senator
Robert F. Wagner
Democratic

The United States Senate election of 1944 in New York was held on November 8, 1944. Incumbent Democratic Senator Robert F. Wagner was re-elected to a fourth term over Republican Thomas J. Curran. Wagner would not complete the term, resigning in June 1949 due to ill health.

== General election ==
=== Candidates ===
- Thomas J. Curran, Secretary of State of New York (Republican)
- Eric Hass, candidate for Attorney General in 1942 (Socialist Labor)
- Robert F. Wagner, incumbent Senator (American Labor, Democratic, and Liberal)

=== Results ===
1944 United States Senate election in New York
Party	Candidate	Votes	%
Democratic	Robert F. Wagner (incumbent)	2,485,735	40.03%
American Labor	Robert F. Wagner (incumbent)	483,785	7.79%
Liberal	Robert F. Wagner (incumbent)	325,056	5.23%
Total	Robert F. Wagner (incumbent)	3,294,576	53.06%
Republican	Thomas J. Curran	2,899,497	46.70%
Socialist Labor	Eric Hass	15,244	0.25%
Total votes		6,209,317	100.00%
