= Benjamin M. Wilcox =

American politician

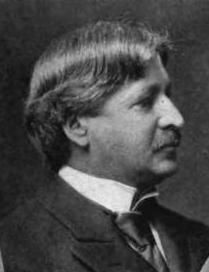
Benjamin M. Wilcox (1903)

Benjamin Martin Wilcox (June 21, 1854 in Fleming, Cayuga County, New York – August 1912) was an American manufacturer and politician from New York.

== Life ==
He was the son of Joseph Wilcox and Lydia (Martin) Wilcox. He attended the public schools in Auburn. In 1870, he became a messenger, and later a clerk in the County Clerk's office. He was Deputy County Clerk from 1877 to 1882; and Clerk of Cayuga County from 1883 to 1891. Afterwards he engaged in the manufacture of ladies' shoes.

He was a member of the New York State Assembly (Cayuga Co.) in 1894 and 1895. He was a member of the New York State Senate from 1896 to 1908, sitting in the 119th, 120th, 121st, 122nd, 123rd, 124th, 125th, 126th, 127th, 128th, 129th (all eleven 39th D.), 130th and 131st New York State Legislatures (both 41st D.).

He was buried at the Fort Hill Cemetery in Auburn.

== Sources ==
- The New York Red Book compiled by Edgar L. Murlin (published by James B. Lyon, Albany NY, 1897; pg. 174f, 404 and 510f)
- Sketches of the members of the Legislature in The Evening Journal Almanac (1895; pg. 52)

New York State Assembly
Preceded by Charles Clinton Adams	New York State Assembly; Cayuga County; 1894–1895	Succeeded by W. Clarence Sheldon 1st D.; Eugene B. Rounds 2nd D.
New York State Senate
Preceded by new district	New York State Senate; 39th District; 1896–1906	Succeeded by Harvey D. Hinman
Preceded by William J. Tully	New York State Senate; 41st District; 1907–1908	Succeeded by Benn Conger
