= George H. Cobb =

American politician (1864–1943)

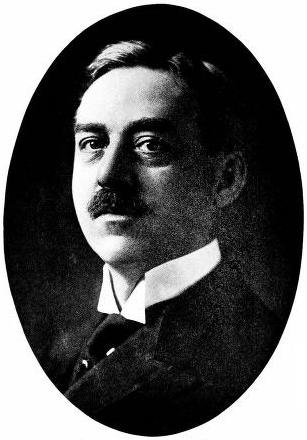
Cobb c. 1916

George Henry Cobb (October 10, 1864 – January 1943) was an American politician from New York. He was the president pro tempore of the New York State Senate and the acting lieutenant governor of New York in 1910.

== Life ==
Cobb was born in Hounsfield, New York to Elijah Cobb and Emily (Crandall, Frink) Cobb. He graduated from Potsdam State Normal School in 1886, then studied law, and was admitted to the bar in 1891. On April 19, 1893, he married Louisa Wenzel. In 1898, he was City Recorder of Hounsfield. He was District Attorney of Jefferson County from 1899 to 1904.

He was a member of the New York State Senate (35th D.) from 1905 to 1912, sitting in the 128th, 129th, 130th, 131st, 132nd, 133rd, 134th and 135th New York State Legislatures. He was a delegate to the 1908 Republican National Convention. In March 1910, after the resignation of Jotham P. Allds, Cobb was chosen President pro tempore of the State Senate. In October 1910, after the resignation of Governor Charles Evans Hughes, who had been appointed to the United States Supreme Court, and the succession of Lt. Gov. Horace White to the governorship, Cobb became Acting Lieutenant Governor until the end of the year.

He was a member of the New York State Commission for the Panama–Pacific International Exposition in San Francisco in 1915.

He was a member of the New York State Motion Picture Censorship Commission until January 1926.

== Sources ==
- The Cobb family, at USGenNet
- The deadlocked Rep. caucus, in NYT on March 11, 1910
- State of New York at the Panama-Pacific International Exposition, San Francisco, California, 1915 (Albany, 1916; pg. 24)
- Obit in NYT on January 12, 1943 (subscription required)
- His wife's obit, in NYT on March 13, 1938 (subscription required)

New York State Senate
Preceded by Elon R. Brown	New York State Senate; 35th District; 1905–1912	Succeeded by Elon R. Brown
Political offices
Preceded by Jotham P. Allds	President pro tempore of the New York State Senate; 1910	Succeeded by Robert F. Wagner
Preceded by Horace White	Lieutenant Governor of New York; Acting; 1910	Succeeded by Thomas F. Conway
