= Elon R. Brown =

American lawyer and politician

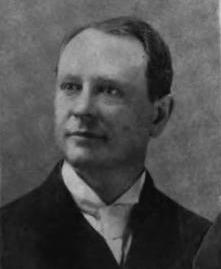
Brown c. 1903

Elon Rouse Brown (October 7, 1857, Orleans, Jefferson County, New York – September 24, 1922, Fox Island, Cape Vincent, Jefferson County, New York) was an American lawyer and politician from New York. He was President pro tempore of the New York State Senate from 1915 to 1918.

== Life ==
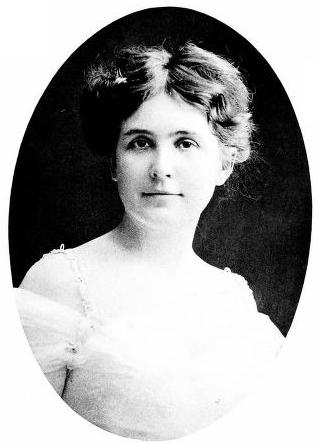
Ettella B. (Greene) Brown (1916)

He was the son of Elon Galusha Brown and Lucretia (Rouse) Brown. He graduated from Brown University in 1876. He was admitted to the bar in 1880, and practiced in Watertown, New York. On November 25, 1882, he married Ettella B. Greene, and they had three children.

He was a delegate to the New York State Constitutional Convention of 1894. He was a member of the New York State Senate (35th D.) from 1898 to 1904, sitting in the 121st, 122nd, 123rd, 124th, 125th, 126th and 127th New York State Legislatures.

He was again a member of the State Senate from 1913 to 1918, sitting in the 136th, 137th, 138th, 139th, 140th and 141st New York State Legislatures; and was Minority Leader from 1913 to 1914, and President pro tempore from 1915 to 1918.

He was a delegate to the 1900, 1904, 1916 and 1920 Republican National Conventions.

His wife was a member of the New York State Commission for the Panama–Pacific International Exposition in 1915; and acted as one of the official hostesses at the New York Pavilion during the exposition.

== Sources ==
- ELON R. BROWN DIES AT SUMMER CAMP in NYT on September 25, 1922
- State of New York at the Panama–Pacific International Exposition, San Francisco, California, 1915 (Albany, 1916; pg. 24)

New York State Senate
Preceded by Joseph Mullin	New York State Senate; 35th District; 1898–1904	Succeeded by George H. Cobb
Preceded by George H. Cobb	New York State Senate; 35th District; 1913–1918	Succeeded by Burt Z. Kasson
Political offices
Preceded by Robert F. Wagner	President pro tempore of the New York State Senate; 1915–1918	Succeeded by J. Henry Walters
Preceded by John F. Murtaugh	Majority Leader of the New York State Senate; 1915–1918	Succeeded by J. Henry Walters
