= Majority Leader of the New York State Senate =

- Seal of New York

- Flag of New York

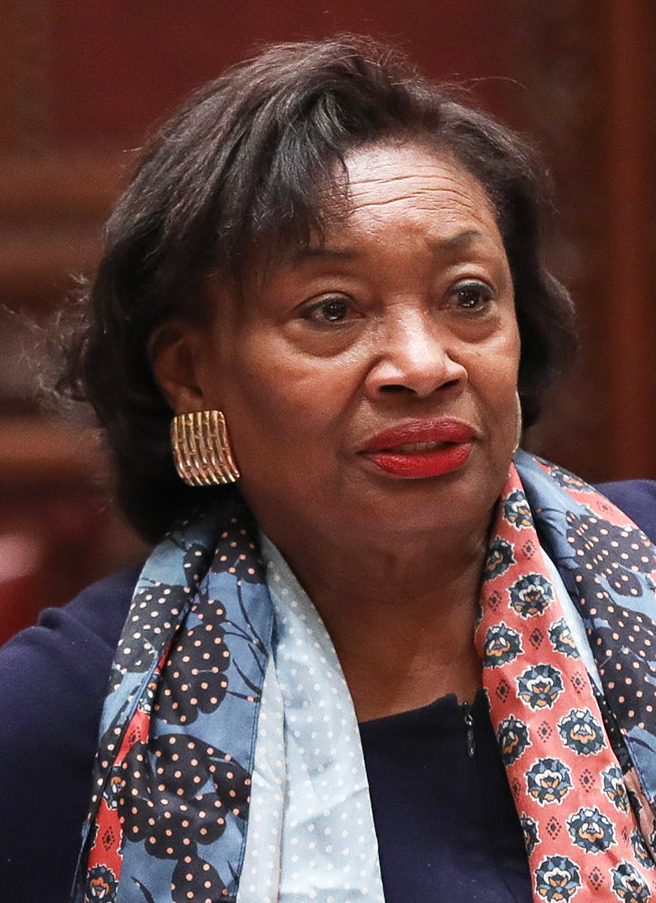
- Incumbent; Andrea Stewart-Cousins since January 9, 2019
- Style: The Honorable (diplomatic); Madam President (within the senate)
- Inaugural holder: William H. Robertson (1874)
- Formation: New York State Constitution
- Succession: Second
- Salary: $142,000 (2023)
- Website: https://www.nysenate.gov/

The majority leader of the New York State Senate is elected by the majority of the members of the New York State Senate. The position usually coincides with the title of temporary president of the State Senate, who presides over the session of the State Senate if the lieutenant governor of New York (who is ex officio president of the State Senate) is absent. The temporary president of the State Senate becomes acting lieutenant governor for the remainder of the unexpired term in case of a vacancy in the office of lieutenant governor, or until a new lieutenant governor is appointed In case of a vacancy in the offices of both the governor and lieutenant governor at the same time, the temporary president of the State Senate becomes Acting Governor. If the double vacancy occurs until three months before the mid-term state elections, a special election for governor of New York and lieutenant governor is held. If the double vacancy occurs later, the Temporary President of the State Senate acts as governor until the end of the unexpired term. The temporary president of the State Senate retains both majority leadership and a seat in the State Senate while acting as lieutenant governor or governor.

As of January 2019, Democrat Andrea Stewart-Cousins is the Senate majority leader.

== History ==
The position of president pro tempore of the New York State Senate was created as a standing office by a constitutional amendment in 1873. The President pro tempore was elected for the duration of the biennial senatorial term which comprised two sessions, the first in an even-numbered year, the other in the following odd-numbered year.

Before this time, a President pro tempore was elected only in case of vacancy (the President pro tem acting as lieutenant governor for the remainder of the term), or if the lieutenant governor was absent. In practice, this new arrangement transferred much power from the lieutenant governor to the President pro tempore, whose political position became comparable to that of the Speaker of the New York State Assembly.

After the impeachment of Governor William Sulzer in October 1913, Lt. Gov. Martin H. Glynn became governor, and President pro tempore Robert F. Wagner became acting lieutenant governor. At the time Wagner, as acting lieutenant governor, was considered to be president of the Senate and it was deemed necessary to elect another member as president pro tempore/majority leader, and John F. Murtaugh was chosen.

The precedent of 1913–1914 caused some confusion after the death of Lt. Gov. Thomas W. Wallace in 1943. It was unclear if the Majority Leader had to give up his post upon becoming acting lieutenant governor, and if such an acting lieutenant governor became President of the Senate for the remainder of the unexpired term.

There was a lengthy dispute over the leadership of the Senate during June and July 2009. On June 8, 2009, Democrats Hiram Monserrate and Pedro Espada Jr., joined the 30 Republican members of the State Senate to attempt to issue a motion to replace current Majority Leader Malcolm Smith with Minority Leader Dean Skelos. Following the precedent of 1913, the temporary presidency and the majority leadership would have been separated again under this scenario. Since the office of lieutenant governor fell vacant after Lieutenant Governor David Paterson ascended to the governorship upon Governor Eliot Spitzer's resignation, the majority leaders (Bruno, Skelos and Smith) have acted as lieutenant governors. The motions put forward on June 8 also sought to select Pedro Espada as Temporary President of the State Senate, which would have installed him as acting lieutenant governor. The Democrats have disputed the legitimacy of the motions put forward on June 8. The New York State Senate has been providing a running update of the legal proceedings since June 11, 2009. The dispute ended July 9, 2009, when Senator Espada announced he would return to the Democratic caucus and take on the position of majority leader, while it was also announced that former majority leader Malcolm Smith had assumed the title of president pro tempore, and John L. Sampson served as Democratic conference leader with the understanding he would assume the presidency at an undetermined future date. Following the 2010 election and the Republican victory in the Senate, Senator Dean Skelos from Long Island served as both temporary president and majority leader, but resigned in May 2015 in the midst of corruption charges.

Traditionally, the positions of acting lieutenant governor and acting governor were considered to be tied to the post of Majority Leader. This means that if the Majority Leader resigns, or is ousted from office, or if the majority changes and a new majority leader is chosen, the offices of acting lieutenant governor or acting governor were transferred at the same time to the new majority leader.

Democrat Andrea Stewart-Cousins became Senate majority leader in January 2019, the first woman and African-American to do so.

== Presidents pro tempore (1874–1938) ==
President pro tem	Party	Took office	Left office	Notes
William H. Robertson	Republican	1874	July 23, 1881	resigned his seat during his fourth term to accept appointment as Collector of the Port of New York
Dennis McCarthy	Republican	July 23, 1881	December 31, 1881	elected for the remainder of the term
vacant		January 3, 1882	December 31, 1882	John C. Jacobs was the candidate of the Democratic majority but, due to the split of the Democrats, no President pro tem was chosen by a senate with 14 regular Democrats, 3 Tammany men and 15 Republicans
John C. Jacobs	Democrat	January 11, 1883	December 31, 1883	elected for the remainder of the term
Dennis McCarthy	Republican	1884	December 31, 1885	Acting Lieutenant Governor 1885
Edmund L. Pitts	Republican	January 4, 1886	December 31, 1887	
Henry R. Low	Republican	January 1888	December 1, 1888	died in office
Jacob Sloat Fassett	Republican	January 1889	August 1, 1891	vacated his seat during his second term when appointed Collector of the Port of New York
Jacob A. Cantor	Democratic	January 1892	December 31, 1893	Minority Leader 1888-1891 and 1894–1898
Charles T. Saxton	Republican	January 1894	December 31, 1894	vacated his seat when taking office as Lieutenant Governor of New York
Edmund O'Connor	Republican	January 1895	December 31, 1895	elected for the remainder of the term
Timothy E. Ellsworth	Republican	January 1896	December 31, 1902	three terms (1896–98, 1899–1900, 1901–02)
John Raines	Republican	January 1903	December 16, 1909	Acting Lieutenant Governor 1906; died in office during his fourth term
Jotham P. Allds	Republican	January 5, 1910	February 23, 1910	elected for the remainder of the term; resigned during bribery investigation, later found guilty by Senate vote
George H. Cobb	Republican	March 11, 1910	December 31, 1910	elected for the remainder of the term; Acting Lieutenant Governor 1910
Robert F. Wagner	Democratic	January 1911	January 6, 1914	two terms; Acting Lieutenant Governor 1913–1914; Minority Leader 1915–1918
John F. Murtaugh	Democratic	January 6, 1914	December 31, 1914	chosen Majority Leader while Acting Lt. Gov. Wagner continued as Temporary President/Acting Lieutenant Governor
Elon R. Brown	Republican	January 1915	December 31, 1918	two terms
J. Henry Walters	Republican	January 1919	December 31, 1920	
Clayton R. Lusk	Republican	January 1921	December 31, 1922	Acting Lieutenant Governor 1922; Minority Leader 1923–1924
Jimmy Walker	Democratic	January 1923	December 31, 1924	Minority Leader 1919–1922 and 1925
John Knight	Republican	January 1925	March 30, 1931	vacated his seat during his fourth term when appointed U.S. Judge for the Western District of NY
George R. Fearon	Republican	April 9, 1931	December 31, 1932	elected for the remainder of the term
John J. Dunnigan	Democratic	January 4, 1933	December 31, 1938	three terms; Minority Leader 1931–1932 and 1939–1944

== Majority leaders since 1939 ==
Majority Leader	Party	Took office	Left office	Notes
Perley A. Pitcher	Republican	January 3, 1939	February 20, 1939	Minority Leader 1937–1938; died in office
Joe R. Hanley	Republican	February 27, 1939	December 31, 1943	elected for the remainder of the term, then re-elected twice; Acting Lieutenant Governor 1942 and 1943; vacated his seat when taking office as Lieutenant Governor of New York
Benjamin F. Feinberg	Republican	January 4, 1944	March 30, 1949	elected for the remainder of the term, then re-elected three times; vacated his seat when appointed Chairman of the Public Service Commission
Arthur H. Wicks	Republican	March 30, 1949	November 19, 1953	elected for the remainder of the term, then re-elected twice, then resigned; Acting Lieutenant Governor 1953
Walter J. Mahoney	Republican	January 6, 1954	December 31, 1964	elected for the remainder of the term, then re-elected five times; Acting Lieutenant Governor 1954
Joseph Zaretzki	Democratic	February 3, 1965	December 31, 1965	elected after a month of deadlock; Minority Leader 1957–1964 and 1966–1974
Earl W. Brydges	Republican	January, 1966	December 31, 1972	four terms (1966, 1967–68, 1969–70, 1971–72); Minority Leader 1965
Warren M. Anderson	Republican	January, 1973	December 31, 1988	eight terms; longest-serving Majority Leader (16 years); Acting Lieutenant Governor 1973–1974 and 1985–1986
Ralph J. Marino	Republican	January, 1989	November 25, 1994	ousted by his party shortly before the end of his third term
Joseph Bruno	Republican	November 25, 1994	June 24, 2008	elected for the remainder of the term, then re-elected seven times, then resigned; Acting Lieutenant Governor 2008.
Dean Skelos	Republican	June 24, 2008	December 31, 2008	elected for the remainder of the term; Acting Lieutenant Governor 2008.
Malcolm Smith	Democratic	January 7, 2009	June 8, 2009	Acting Lieutenant Governor Jan. 7 – June 8, 2009; Minority Leader 2007–2008 and June 8–15, 2009
Dean Skelos	Republican	June 8, 2009	June 15, 2009	Skelos was chosen Majority Leader, and Pedro Espada Jr. Temporary President/Acting Lieutenant Governor.
Dean Skelos/Malcolm Smith	Disputed	June 15, 2009	July 9, 2009	Pedro Espada Jr. continued as Temporary President/Acting Lieutenant Governor, but after the return of Hiram Monserrate to the Democratic caucus, the Senate was tied, and both leaders claimed to be the Majority Leader during the 2009 New York State Senate leadership crisis.
Pedro Espada Jr.	Democratic	July 9, 2009	December 14, 2010	Malcolm Smith was Temporary President since July 9, 2009, and John L. Sampson was Chairman of the Democratic Conference. As sitting Majority Leader, Espada was indicted on six federal counts of embezzlement and theft on December 14, 2010, and was stripped of his leadership position.
vacant		December 14, 2010	December 31, 2010	While the office of Majority Leader remained vacant, Malcolm Smith continued as Temporary President, and John L. Sampson as Chairman of the Democratic Conference.
Dean Skelos	Republican	January 1, 2011	December 31, 2012	
Jeffrey Klein/Dean Skelos	Majority Coalition	January 1, 2013	December 31, 2014	The leaders of the Republican and the Independent Democratic conferences would have joint and equal authority over bills that the Senate takes up, committee assignments, appointments, and state budget negotiations. Senator Skelos and Senator Klein also take turns as temporary president of the Senate, a position defined in the State Constitution that is next in the gubernatorial line of succession after the lieutenant governor.
Dean Skelos	Republican	January 1, 2015	May 11, 2015	Republicans won back an outright majority in the State Senate. Resigned as Temporary President and Majority Leader on May 11, 2015, due to federal corruption charges.
John J. Flanagan	Republican	May 11, 2015	December 31, 2018	
Andrea Stewart-Cousins	Democratic	January 9, 2019	present	Minority Leader 2013–2019. First woman to hold post.

== See also ==
- List of New York State legislatures
