= Robert F. Wagner =

American politician (1877–1953)

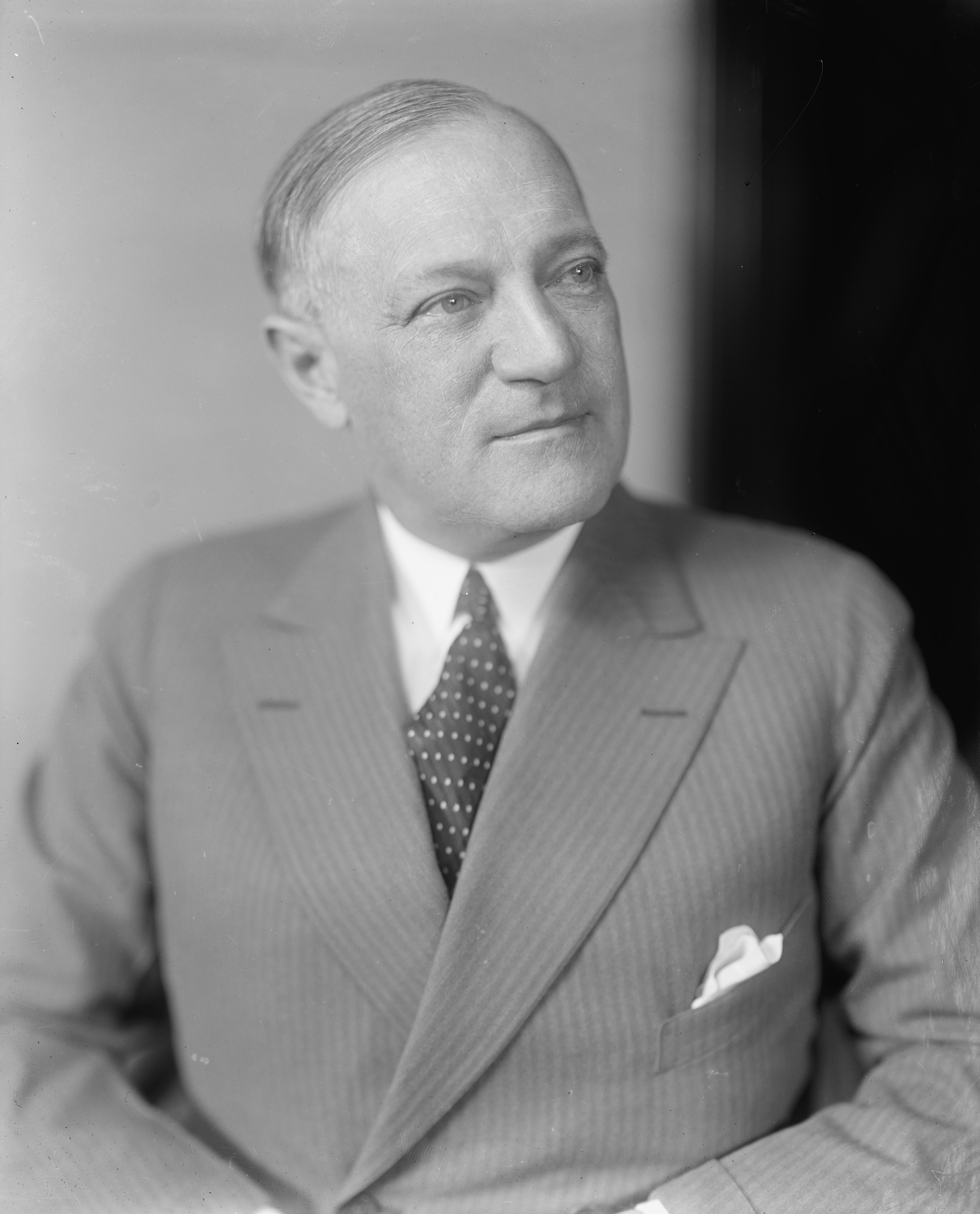
- Portrait by Harris & Ewing c. 1927–1945

United States Senator from New York
- In office March 4, 1927 – June 28, 1949
- Preceded by: James W. Wadsworth Jr.
- Succeeded by: John Foster Dulles

Justice of the New York Supreme Court for the First Judicial Division
- In office January 1, 1919 – September 28, 1926

Acting Lieutenant Governor of New York
- In office October 17, 1913 – December 31, 1914
- Governor: Martin H. Glynn
- Preceded by: Martin H. Glynn
- Succeeded by: Edward Schoeneck

Member of the New York State Senate from the 16th district
- In office January 1, 1909 – December 31, 1918
- Preceded by: John T. McCall
- Succeeded by: James A. Foley

Member of the New York State Assembly
- In office January 1, 1907 – December 31, 1908
- Preceded by: Thomas Rock
- Succeeded by: George W. Baumann
- Constituency: 22nd district
- In office January 1, 1905 – December 31, 1905
- Preceded by: Gotthardt A. Litthauer
- Succeeded by: Maurice F. Smith
- Constituency: 30th district

Personal details
- Born: Robert Ferdinand Wagner; June 8, 1877 Nastätten, Hesse-Nassau, Kingdom of Prussia, German Empire
- Died: May 4, 1953 (aged 75) New York City, U.S.
- Party: Democratic
- Spouse: Margaret Marie McTague (m. 1908; died 1919)
- Children: Robert F. Wagner Jr.
- Education: City College of New York New York Law School
- Profession: Lawyer

Robert Ferdinand Wagner I (June 8, 1877 – May 4, 1953) was an American attorney and Democratic Party politician who represented the state of New York in the United States Senate from 1927 to 1949.

Born in Prussia, Wagner immigrated to the United States with his family in 1885. After graduating from New York Law School, Wagner won election to the New York State Legislature, eventually becoming the Democratic leader of the New York State Senate. Working closely with fellow New York City Democrat Al Smith, Wagner and Smith embraced reform, especially to the benefit of their core constituency, the working class. They built a coalition for these reforms that embraced unions, social workers, some businessmen, and numerous middle-class activists and civic reform organizations across the state. Wagner left the state senate in 1918, and served as a justice of the New York Supreme Court until his election to the U.S. Senate in 1926.

As a Senator, Wagner was a leader of the New Deal Coalition, putting special emphasis on supporting the labor movement. He was a close associate and strong supporter of President Franklin D. Roosevelt. He sponsored three major laws: the National Labor Relations Act of 1935 (also known as the Wagner Act), the Social Security Act of 1935, and the Housing Act of 1937. Wagner resigned from the Senate in 1949 due to ill health, and died in 1953. His son, Robert F. Wagner Jr., was mayor of New York City from 1954 through 1965.

== Early life and education ==
Robert Ferdinand Wagner was born on June 8, 1877, in Nastätten, Hesse-Nassau, Kingdom of Prussia, German Empire (now in Rhein-Lahn-Kreis, Rhineland-Palatinate, Federal Republic of Germany). The family immigrated to the United States in 1885 and settled in New York City's Yorkville neighborhood, where Wagner attended the public schools. His father was a janitor.

He graduated from the College of the City of New York (now named City College of New York) in 1898, where he was a brother of Phi Sigma Kappa fraternity, and from New York Law School in 1900. He was admitted to the bar in 1900.

== Political career ==
As a young lawyer he became part of the Tammany Hall Democratic machine in Manhattan. He was elected to New York State Assembly in 1905 (New York Co., 30th D.), 1907 and 1908 (both New York Co., 22nd D.).

=== New York State Senate ===
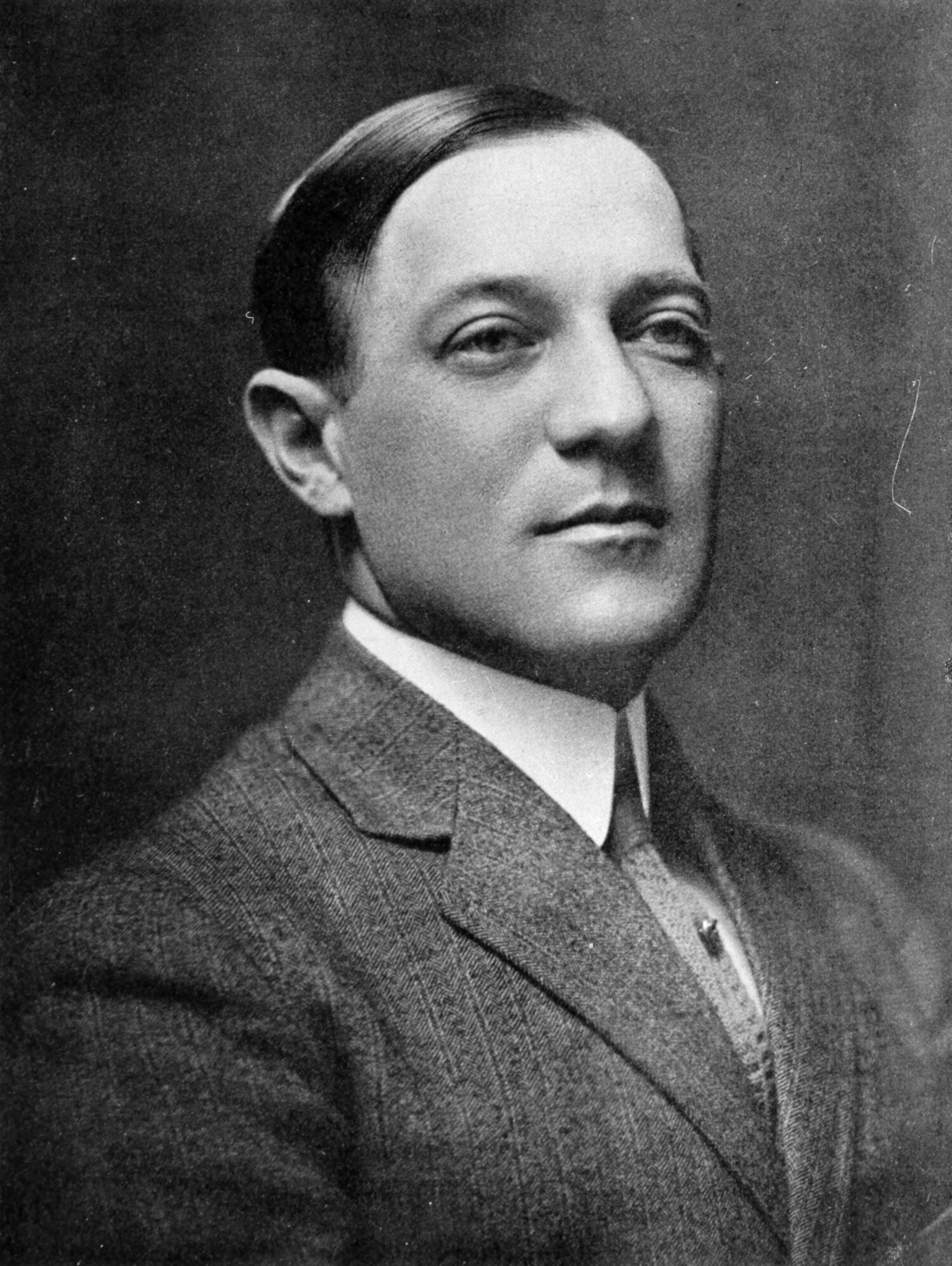
Wagner's official State Senate portrait, 1911

He was a member of the New York State Senate (16th D.) from 1909 to 1918, sitting in the 132nd, 133rd, 134th, 135th, 136th, 137th, 138th, 139th, 140th and 141st New York State Legislatures. He was President pro tempore of the New York State Senate from 1911 to 1914. Wagner became Acting Lieutenant Governor of New York after the impeachment of Governor William Sulzer, and the succession of Lieutenant Governor Martin H. Glynn to the governorship. In 1914, while Wagner remained President pro tempore, John F. Murtaugh was chosen Majority Leader of the State Senate. That was the only time before 2009 that the two offices were not held by the same person. After the Democrats lost their Senate majority, Wagner was Senate Minority Leader from January 1915 until he retired in 1918.

In the aftermath of the horrible Triangle Shirtwaist Factory fire, he was Chairman of the State Factory Investigating Committee (1911–1915). His Vice Chairman was fellow Tammany Hall politician, Al Smith. They held a series of widely publicized investigations around the state, interviewing 222 witnesses and taking 3500 pages of testimony. They started with the issue of fire safety and moved on to broader issues of the risks of injury in the factory environment. Their findings led to 38 new laws regulating labor in New York State and gave each of them a reputation as leading progressive reformers working on behalf of the working class. In the process, they changed Tammany's reputation from mere corruption to progressive endeavors to help workers.

Wagner was a delegate to the New York State Constitutional Conventions of 1915 and 1938 and a justice of the New York Supreme Court from 1919 to 1926.

=== U.S. Senate ===
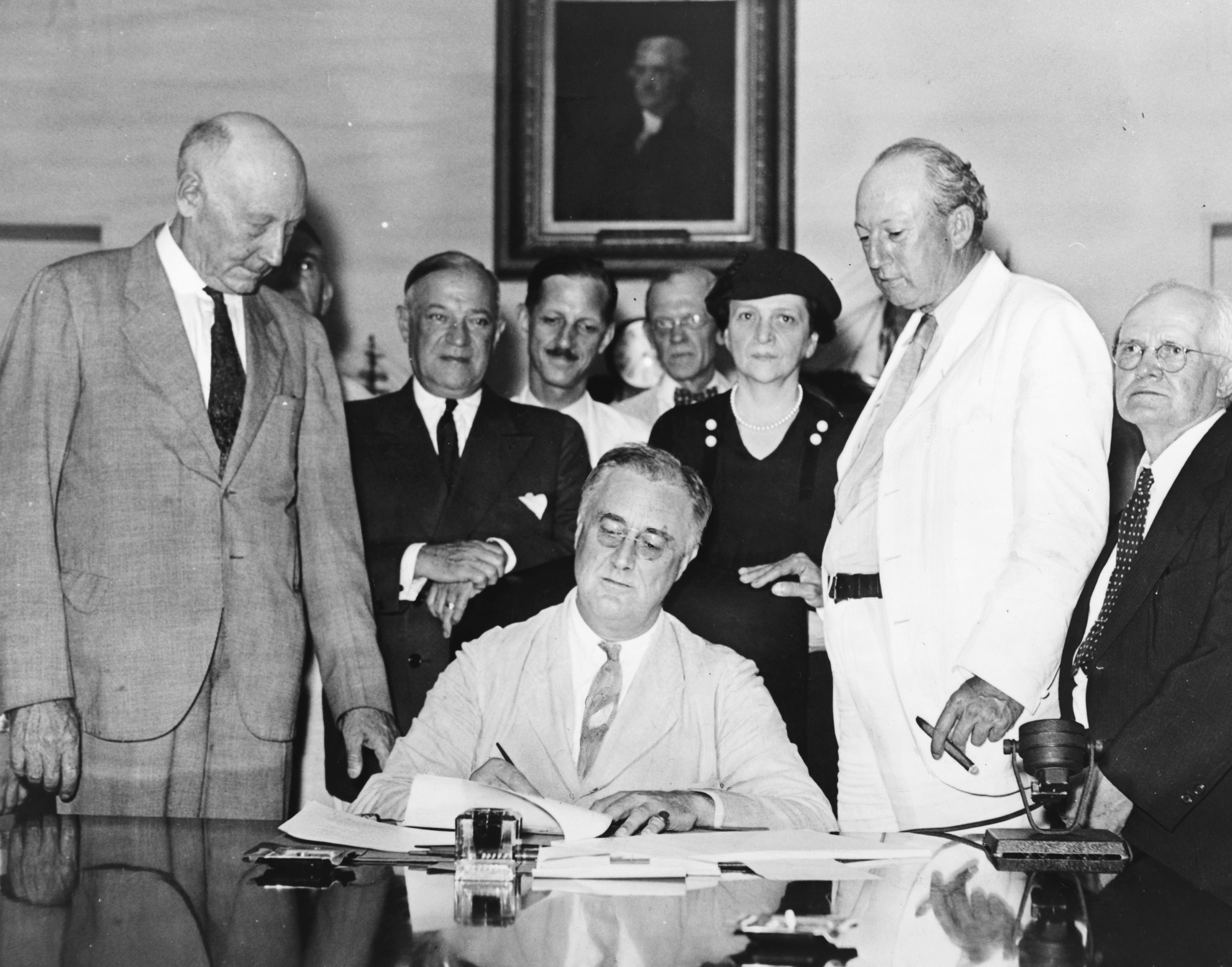
President Roosevelt signs the Social Security Act into law, August 14, 1935. (Wagner second from left)

Wagner was elected as a Democrat to the United States Senate in 1926 and re-elected in 1932, 1938, and 1944. He resigned on June 28, 1949, due to ill health. He was unable to attend any sessions of the 80th or 81st Congress from 1947 to 1949 because of a heart ailment. Wagner was the Chairman of the Committee on Patents in the 73rd Congress, of the Committee on Public Lands and Surveys in the 73rd and 74th Congresses, and of the Committee on Banking and Currency in the 75th through 79th Congresses. He was a delegate to the United Nations Monetary and Financial Conference in Bretton Woods, New Hampshire, in 1944.

Wagner, who had known the future President when they were in the New York state legislature together, was a member of Franklin Roosevelt's Brain Trust. He was very involved in labor issues, fought for legal protection and rights for workers, and was a leader in crafting the New Deal.

In April 1943, a confidential analysis by British scholar Isaiah Berlin of the Senate Foreign Relations Committee for the British Foreign Office stated of Wagner:

Robert Wagner of New York- a veteran Liberal Tammany statesman, author of the United States labour code and devotee of the New Deal who is respected by the White House for his political acumen within his own State no less than for his political connexions. Greatest champion of the Liberal cause in the United States Senate since [George W.] Norris. A typical anti-Nazi German Democrat who has supported all the Administration measures, being usually well in advance of them.

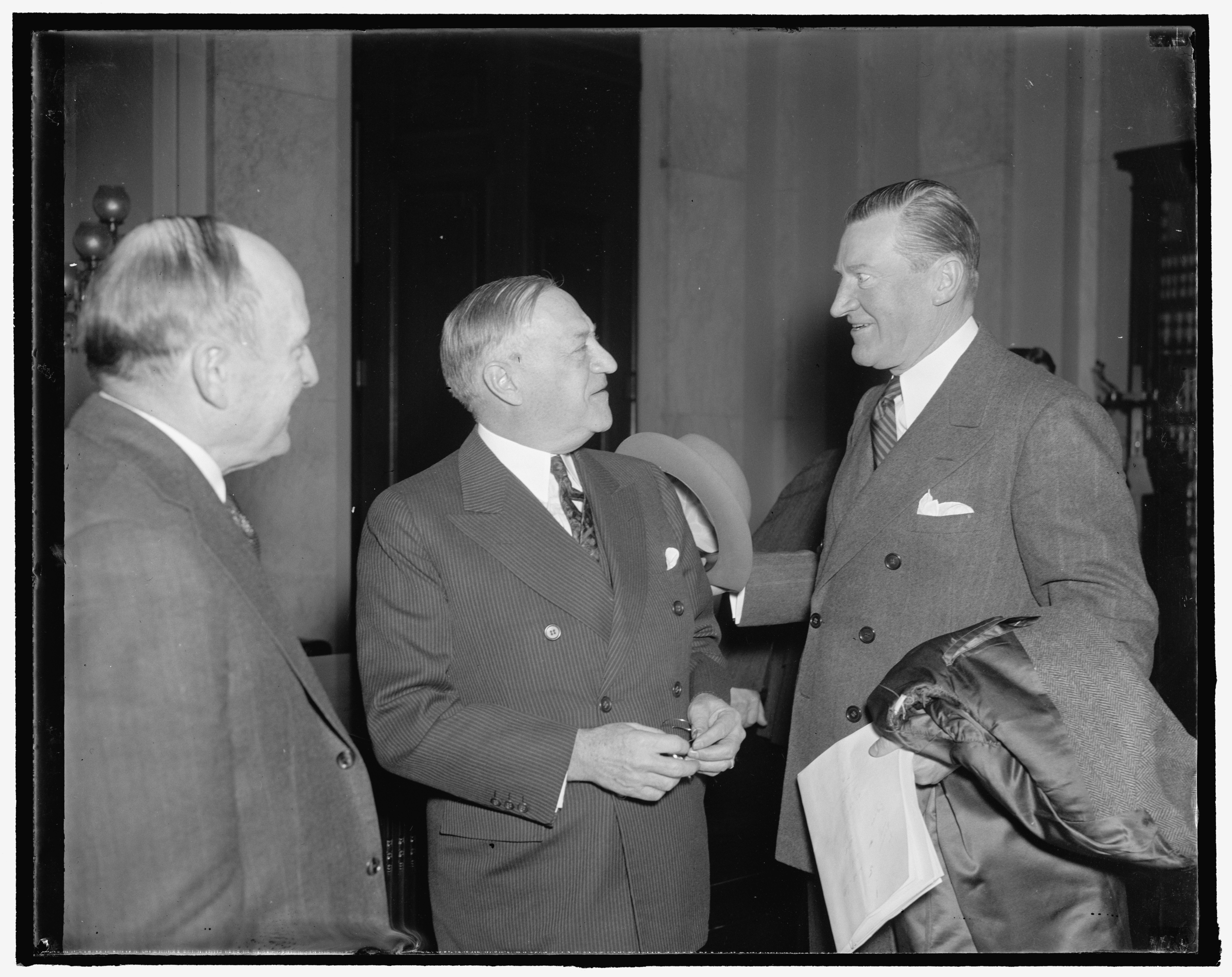
Federal Housing Administrator Stewart McDonald (right) discusses amendments to the Wagner Housing Act with its author, Senator Robert F. Wagner, December 1, 1937.

His most important legislative achievements include the National Industrial Recovery Act in 1933 and the Wagner–Steagall Housing Act of 1937. After the Supreme Court ruled the National Industrial Recovery Act and the National Recovery Administration unconstitutional, Wagner helped pass the National Labor Relations Act (also known as the Wagner Act) in 1935, a similar but much more expansive bill. The National Labor Relations Act, perhaps Wagner's greatest achievement, was a seminal event in the history of organized labor in the United States. It created the National Labor Relations Board, which mediated disputes between unions and corporations, and greatly expanded the rights of workers by banning many "unfair labor practices" and guaranteeing all workers the right to form a union. He also introduced the Railway Pension Law and cosponsored the Wagner–O'Day Act, the predecessor to the Javits–Wagner–O'Day Act.

Wagner was instrumental in writing the Social Security Act, and originally introduced it in the United States Senate.

The Wagner–Hatfield amendment to the Communications Act of 1934, aimed at turning over twenty-five percent of all radio channels to non-profit radio broadcasters, did not pass. In 1939 he co-sponsored with Representative Edith Nourse Rogers (R–MA) the Wagner–Rogers Bill to admit 20,000 Jewish refugees under the age of 14 to the United States from Nazi Germany, but the bill never passed.

Wagner and Edward P. Costigan sponsored a federal anti-lynching law in 1934. They tried to persuade President Roosevelt to support the bill but Roosevelt refused for fear of alienating Southern Democrats and losing their support for New Deal programs. There were 18 lynchings of blacks in the South in 1935, but after the threat of federal legislation, the number fell to eight in 1936 and to two in 1939.

On June 28, 1949, Wagner resigned from the Senate because of ill health; John Foster Dulles was appointed by Governor Thomas E. Dewey on July 7, 1949, to fill the vacancy temporarily.

== Personal life and death ==
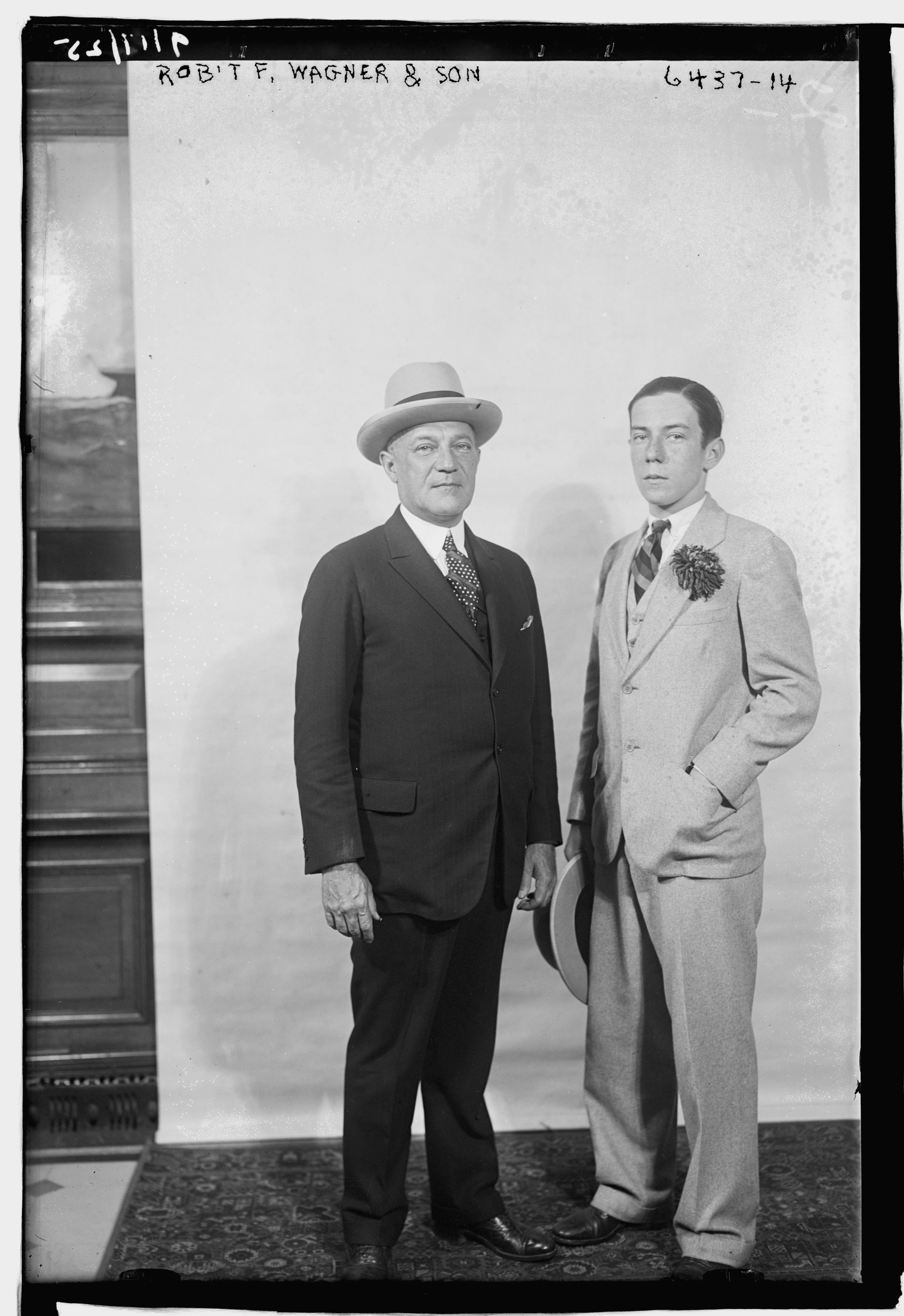
Wagner with his son Robert Jr., 1925

Wagner was raised as a Lutheran, but he became a Methodist in his college years and taught Sunday school; he converted to Roman Catholicism in 1946.

In 1908, Wagner married Margaret Marie McTague. She died in 1919. They had one son, Robert F. Wagner Jr who later served as Mayor of New York City from 1954 to 1965. Later in the 1930s, Wagner dated the communist journalist Marguerite Young.

In 1927, he received the first honorary citizenship of Nastätten, his town of birth. Wagner died on May 4, 1953, in New York City, and was interred in Calvary Cemetery, Queens.

== Legacy ==
On September 14, 2004, a portrait of Wagner, along with one of Senator Arthur H. Vandenberg, was unveiled in the Senate Reception Room. The new portraits joined a group of distinguished former senators, including Henry Clay, Daniel Webster, John C. Calhoun, Robert M. La Follette, and Robert A. Taft. Portraits of this group of senators, known as the "Famous Five", were unveiled on March 12, 1959.

His grandson, Robert (Bobby) Ferdinand Wagner III, was a Deputy Mayor, Director Urban Planning Commission and President of the New York City Board of Education in the 80s and 90s.

Robert F. Wagner Middle School located at 220 East 76th Street in New York City is named after him.

The former Wagner Hall on the campus of the City College of New York is named for him.

== See also ==
- United States labor law
- Social Security (United States)
- Public housing in the United States
- List of United States senators born outside the United States

== Notes ==
Party political offices
Preceded by Harry C. Walker	Democratic nominee for U.S. Senator from New York (Class 3); 1926, 1932, 1938, 1944	Succeeded by Herbert H. Lehman
New York State Assembly
Preceded by Gotthardt A. Litthauer	New York State Assembly; New York County, 30th District; 1905	Succeeded by Maurice F. Smith
Preceded by Thomas Rock	New York State Assembly; New York County, 22nd District; 1907–1908	Succeeded by George W. Baumann
New York State Senate
Preceded by John T. McCall	New York State Senate; 16th District; 1909–1918	Succeeded by James A. Foley
Political offices
Preceded by George H. Cobb	Majority Leader of the New York State Senate; 1911–1914	Succeeded by John F. Murtaugh
Preceded by George H. Cobb	President pro tempore of the New York State Senate; 1911–1914	Succeeded by Elon R. Brown
Preceded by Martin H. Glynn	Lieutenant Governor of New York; Acting; 1913–1914	Succeeded by Edward Schoeneck
Preceded by Elon R. Brown	Minority Leader of the New York State Senate; 1915–1918	Succeeded by James A. Foley
U.S. Senate
Preceded by James Wolcott Wadsworth Jr.	U.S. senator (Class 3) from New York; 1927–1949; Served alongside: Royal S. Copeland, James M. Mead, Irving Ives	Succeeded by John Foster Dulles
Preceded by John B. Kendrick	Chair of the Senate Public Lands Committee; 1933–1937	Succeeded by Alva B. Adams
Preceded by Duncan U. Fletcher	Chair of the Senate Banking Committee; 1937–1947	Succeeded by Charles W. Tobey
Preceded by Charles W. Tobey	Ranking Member of the Senate Banking Committee; 1947–1949	Succeeded by Charles W. Tobey
