= Wemple =

Wemple is a surname of Dutch origin. Notable people with the surname include:

- Don Wemple (1917–1944), American football player
- Edward Wemple (1843–1920), American businessman and politician
- Erik Wemple (born 1964), American editor
- William Wemple (lawyer, born 1912) (1912–2002), American lawyer
- William W. Wemple (1862–1933), New York politician
- William W. Wemple, Jr. (1898–1972), New York politician
