= Peachy R. Grattan =

American politician (1801–1881)

Member of the Virginia House of Delegates from the Richmond district
- In office December 4, 1865 – December 2, 1866 Serving with T.J. Evans, N.M. Lee, Littleton Tazewell
- Preceded by: Wyndham Robertson
- Succeeded by: W. W. Crump

Personal details
- Born: November 17, 1801 Rockingham County, Virginia, U.S.
- Died: September 8, 1881 (aged 79) Richmond, Virginia, U.S.
- Resting place: Hollywood Cemetery
- Spouse: Jane Elvira Grattan
- Children: Elizabeth Gilmer Grattan
- Occupation: lawyer

Military service
- Allegiance: Confederate States of America

Peachy Ridgway Grattan (November 17, 1801 – September 8, 1881) was a Virginia lawyer, politician and for 37 years reporter of opinions issued by the Virginia Supreme Court. Elected in July 1865 to represent the City of Richmond in the Virginia House of Delegates, he resigned mid-term.

== Early and family life ==
He was born in Rockingham County, Virginia, to Major Robert Grattan and the former Elizabeth Thornton Gilmer.

He married Jane Elvira Ferguson in Goochland County, Virginia, on August 20, 1827. Six children failed to reach adulthood: James B. Ferguson Grattan (1829-1829), Robert R. Grattan (1835–1850), Mary Peachy Grattan (1831–1838), Jane Gay Grattan (1832–1838), Lavinia Payne Grattan (1842–1843) and Jane Elvira Grattan (1848–1854). Plus, neither of their sons who reached adulthood managed to survive their parents: James Ferguson Grattan (1840–1879) and George Gilmer Grattan (1844–1862). However, their twin daughters Elizabeth (Sally) Gilmer Grattan (1837–1921) and Lucy Gilmer Grattan (1837–1890) did survive their parents.

== Career ==
Peachy Grattan read law and was admitted to the Virginia bar. He moved to Richmond in 1835.

On April 9, 1844, the Court of Appeals appointed Grattan its reporter, and he remained such until his death. He received a salary, and was allowed to continue his private legal practice as well. He succeeded William Leigh, who resigned in 1842 upon being appointed a judge, and his son in law Conway Robinson (1805–1884). The first major Virginia reporter, Daniel Call (1765–1840) published six volumes of reports that were reissued in 1833 and 1854, although the cases therein originally dated before 1803, but Call in his final years sought to fill in gaps left by subsequent reporters, adding previously unprinted cases from 1804 to 1818 in volume 6, together with federal cases dating from 1793 until 1825.

Grattan published 33 volumes of compiled opinions, not wholly chronological but now available online and usually also available as Virginia reports volumes 42 through 74, as well as referred to as 1 Grattan through 33 Grattan. The preface to his 8th volume comments on the judicial reorganization necessitated by the popular election of judges after adoption of the state Constitution of 1851 (and abandoned in later state constitutions), and he also included procedural practice rules. In 1857, Richmond attorneys Roscoe B. Heath (1827–1863) and John M. Patton Jr. devised and published a General Index to Grattan's Reports. A memorial to Grattan starts volume 75 of the Virginia Reports. James Muscoe Mathews (1822–1905) was appointed the reporter to succeed Grattan, and published the volume (which is not known by his name). However, Chief Justice R. C. L. Moncure died in 1882 and the Readjuster Party took control of the Virginia General Assembly in 1883 and refused to reappoint Matthews, instead appointing George W. Hansbrough, who began printing what were later enumerated as volumes 76 through 90 of the Virginia Reports.

According to the 1840 Virginia census, Grattan owned at least one slave, although not listed in the corresponding federal schedule of slaveowners. In June, 1857, Grattan traveled to Cleveland, Ohio to deliver a speech favoring slavery (and denouncing abolitionism preached from the pulpit) to an assembly of the Presbyterian Church. During the 1860 federal census, Grattan owned $10,000 in real estate and $3,000 in personal property, which according to the accompanying slave schedule included two female mulattoes (one a child) and a 19 year old black man. During the American Civil War, his eldest son (James F. Grattan), enlisted as a private with the Williams Rifles (1st Virginia Infantry) on April 19, 1861, was promoted to full Corporal on September 2, 1862, and mustered out on October 28, 1862, probably on account of his younger brother George's death during the Battle of Seven Pines on June 1, 1862, just months after his enlistment in the 12th Virginia Infantry.

After General Lee's (and Richmond Mayor Joseph C. Mayo's) surrender, Grattan ran for one of three Richmond City seats in the Virginia House of Delegates. He won, but sat in only one of the three sessions of that legislature, resigning and being replaced by former Judge (and Confederate Assistant Secretary of the Treasury) and fellow attorney W.W. Crump for the session of 1866–1867. Thus Grattan served alongside T. J. Evans and N. M. Lee, the younger Littleton Tazewell having died before the session began.

== Death and legacy ==
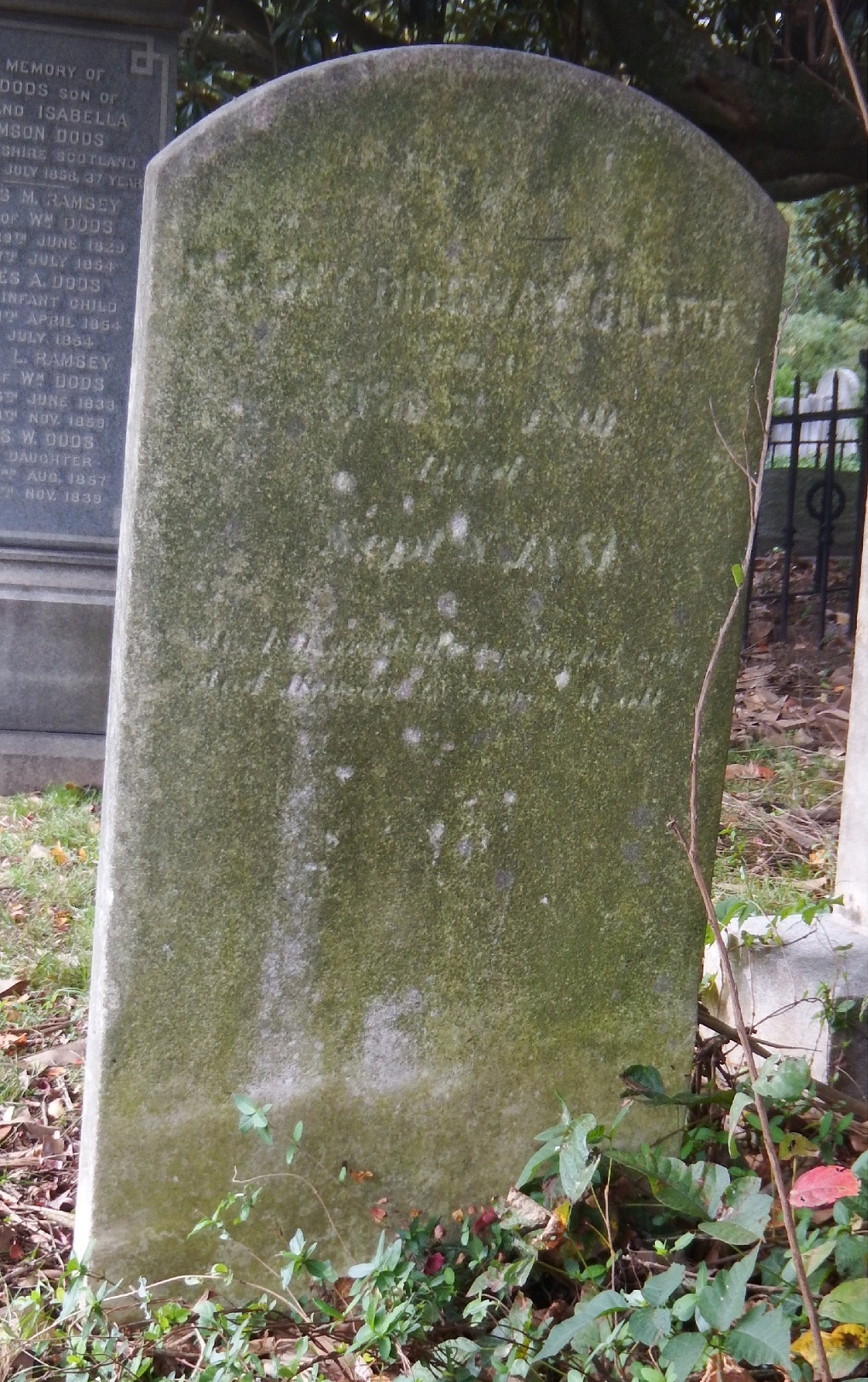
Grave of Grattan in Hollywood Cemetery

Grattan died in 1881. His diary from 1822 until 1834 is held by the Swem library at the College of William and Mary in Williamsburg, Virginia. The Southern Historical Collection at the University of North Carolina at Chapel Hill has two of his letters to his wife during travels to Philadelphia, Pennsylvania and Lewisburg (then in Virginia).
