= Henry K. Ellyson =

American politician (1823–1890)

Henry Keeling Ellyson

Member of the Virginia House of Delegates from the Richmond district
- In office December 5, 1853 – December 6, 1857 Serving with James A. Cowardin; Joseph R. Anderson
- Preceded by: Joseph Lewis Jr.
- Succeeded by: Roscoe B. Heath

47th Mayor of Richmond, Virginia
- In office March 16, 1870 – June 30, 1871
- Preceded by: George Chahoon
- Succeeded by: Anthony M. Kielly

Personal details
- Born: July 11, 1823 Henrico County, Virginia, U.S.
- Died: November 27, 1890 (aged 67) Richmond, Virginia, U.S.
- Spouse: Elizabeth Ellyson
- Relations: Theodore G. Ellyson (grandson)
- Children: James Taylor Ellyson
- Occupation: journalist, sheriff, businessman, politician

Military service
- Allegiance: Virginia; Confederate States
- Branch/service: Virginia Militia

Henry Keeling Ellyson (July 11, 1823 – November 27, 1890) was Virginia journalist, businessman, politician, and Baptist layman. He served in the Virginia House of Delegates, as sheriff of Henrico County during the American Civil War and briefly as mayor of Richmond, Virginia.

== Early and family life ==
Henry K. Ellyson was born in Henrico County, Virginia, on July 31, 1823, to Onan Ellyson (who had served as an ensign in the American Revolutionary War before becoming a wheelwright), and his wife of little more than a year, the former Mary Jane Huot. They named their first born son to honor preacher Henry Keeling, first editor of the Baptist Religious Herald, corresponding secretary of the Baptist Education society and future president of Richmond College. by 1830, the family included three sons and a daughter.

Ellyson married Philadelphia-born Elizabeth Pinkney Barnes in Richmond on June 20, 1843. Three sons and a spinster daughter survived their parents, but their son Luther B. Ellyson (1849–1864) died in the besieged Confederate capitol in November 1864, and two daughters died as infants. Before the American Civil War, H. K. Ellyson owned four enslaved people in 1850, and still owned one enslaved 35-year-old black woman in 1860. By 1870 the H.K. Ellyson household included their surviving first-born son, Henry Theodore Ellyson (1844–1919, who assisted in the printing office and lived with his slightly older wife Lizzie and their infant daughter Mary L. Ellyson), James Taylor Ellyson (b. 1846 and his slightly older wife Lora), William Ellyson (1851–1919), Betty Ellyson (1859–1922) as well as three black female and one black male servant.

== Career ==
At age 14, his father apprenticed Ellyson to the publisher of the Episcopal periodical, the Southern Churchman, although Ellyson never attended college, nor was he Episcopalian. Nonetheless, four years later Ellyson opened his own printing business in 1841, which thrived.

Ellyson also became an influential layman in his Baptist church, as would his sons. He taught Sunday School at Richmond's Second Baptist Church and was its superintendent by 1843. He also served as deacon for 47 year. He also was corresponding secretary of the State Mission Board of Virginia for 45 years (where he encouraged in particular Baptist associations west of the Blue Ridge Mountains and would be succeeded by his fourth son William Ellyson, who served another three decades). H. K. Ellyson also served on the national Foreign Mission Board for 20 years. He was also a leading temperance advocate, and served as a secretary of the Southern Baptist Convention in 1853 and as a vice president in 1882.

Henrico County voters twice elected Ellyson as one of their three (part-time) delegates in the Virginia House of Delegates. He served 1853–1856: one term alongside his future business partner James A. Cowardin (a Catholic) and another alongside industrialist Joseph R. Anderson.

In 1857, Henrico County voters elected Ellyson sheriff, a position he continued during the American Civil War until late 1865. He detained runaway slaves and Union sympathizers, and otherwise supported the Confederacy as well as enforced Virginia law. His second son James Taylor Ellyson enlisted in the Confederate artillery (Second Company of Richmond Howitzers) upon reaching legal age in 1863. After the war, Ellyson took the required loyalty oaths on May 11 and July 5, 1865, and received a pardon. His application stated that he was allowed to continue his county office under the new military government and that he never accepted any Confederate appointment and did not vote in any Confederate election, but chose not to resign his office lest he be conscripted into Confederate service.

Ellyson acquired a half-interest in the Richmond Dispatch after departing Confederate troops lit a fire during their evacuation on the night of April 2–3, which also destroyed the former newspaper's office. He helped the newspaper resume publication in December 1865, and continued to participate in the newspaper's business, including writing editorials, until his death. Although the son of Richmond's long-time mayor Joseph C. Mayo Jr. was a newspaper rival, Ellyson continued to support mayor Joseph C. Mayo, who had been deposed by Union forces and briefly replaced by David J. Saunders, but was again elected Richmond's mayor in April 1866, only to be removed again per Virginia's military governor and replaced by George Chahoon.

In 1867 Ellyson helped found the Conservative Party and by December sat on its state central committee, which opposed the Virginia Constitutional Convention of 1868. After voters ratified the resulting document but not certain controversial anti-Confederate provisions, in 1869 Ellyson accepted an appointment from the city council to the new city school board. He thus helped create Richmond's first free public school system, including for African American children.

After Congressional Reconstruction ended, the Virginia General Assembly allowed Governor Gilbert C. Walker (elected in July 1869) to appoint a new city council for Richmond. He did so in March 1870, retaining only Republicans Mulford, Ordway and William C. Dunham. The new Conservative-dominated council elected Ellyson as the city's 47th mayor on March 16. However, Chahoon refused to leave his office, because the police commissioner had not changed. The General Assembly had also passed an Enabling Act allowing Walker to replace incumbent officials (elected as well as militarily-appointed). Ellyson created a new police force led by his ally John S. Poe Jr., He deputized firemen and other citizens and started what became known as the "Municipal War". Ellyson also filed papers with Judge B.R. Wellford of the city's Circuit Court seeking an injunction directing Chahoon to turn over the municipal books; while Cahoon sought an injunction against Ellyson from his ally, U.S. District Judge John C. Underwood. The gasworks and waterworks superintendents sided with Ellyson and cut off service to the barricaded main police station. Chahoon and his followers refused to surrender, despite being surrounded by the new deputies, who refused others entry and forbade food and water deliveries beginning on March 18. When a crowd of black Republicans tried to rescue the police, Ellyson's supporters fired on them and killed one black Republican, and wounded several more as the crowd resorted to stones. A few nights later, black Republicans ambushed a German Catholic baker who had been deputized by Ellyson (although news reports never identified either of the two fatalities).

General E.R.S. Canby sent three companies of soldiers to rescue the beleaguered policeman, who then took control of another police station. Governor Walker maintained the federal troops had exceeded their authority, but U.S. District Judge John C. Underwood and the applicable federal circuit justice, Chief Justice Salmon P. Chase referred the matter to Virginia Supreme Court of Appeals. That court announced it would issue its decision on April 27, 1870. However, before the judges could make their entrance, overcrowding caused the courtroom's gallery to collapse into the floor below, which in turn collapsed into the legislative chamber below. Initial reports speculated that 75 had been killed and over 500 injured, but when the dust settled, the death toll stood at 62 men (no women had attended the event). Newspapers compared the tragedy to the Monument Theater Fire in which 59 had died. One Virginia state senator was among the dead, and the 215 injured included both Ellyson and Chahoon, former military governor H. H. Wells and house speaker Thomas S. Bocock. The judges themselves were not injured, since their entrance had been delayed before the floor fell. Court reconvened two days later. The decision favored Ellyson, but also called for a popular election a month later.

During that May election, Chahoon appeared to win, but the men carrying the completed ballots from Jackson Ward (whose historically black population had cast the largest vote for Chahoon) were attacked in broad daylight and robbed of the ballots. The Conservative-dominated Election Commission then recognized only the remaining returns and declared Ellyson had won. However, he refused to serve unless elected honorably. Another election was then called, and while the Republicans complained of further skullduggery, the Conservative candidate, New Jersey-born Confederate veteran and editor Anthony M. Kieley was declared the winner over Chahoon. Conservatives then sent Chahoon to prison on a forgery charge, but Governor Walker pardoned him, reputedly on the condition that he leave the state.

Ellyson returned to his printing and newspaper business, assisted by his eldest son, Henry Theodore Ellyson. Later journalists noted that tragedies continued through the year's end—first a drought reduced Virginia's harvest prospects, then an October flood damaged Richmond, and Robert E. Lee died in Lexington, Virginia. Finally, in December, the Spottswood Hotel burned in Richmond; the fire killed eight people. After the financial Panic of 1873, Ellyson urged additional poor relief. Continuing to boost his home town, Ellyson also promoted the Virginia railway companies that merged during the 1870s came under the overall management of the Pennsylvania Railroad. When his newspaper partner Cowardin died in 1882, Ellyson became the Dispatch's president and kept publishing.

Meanwhile, H.K. Ellyson also continued in his church-related activities, as he acknowledged in 1883. African-American members had left to form their own church in 1846 (also called Second Baptist Church, but on Idlewood Avenue). Ellyson had joined the board of Richmond College (now the University of Richmond) in 1868 when it was nearly bankrupt after investing its endowment in Confederate bonds. His youngest son William began attending the college the next year, and would graduate in 1871 and receive a M.A. as having completed all courses of study in 1876. In 1886 H.K. Ellyson became the board's president, serving until his death.

Ellyson's second son J. Taylor Ellyson, became a bookseller and lawyer, and active in postwar Democratic Party politics. He was elected Richmond's 50th mayor as a compromise candidate, assuming office in 1888 (two years after his mother's death of typhoid fever), and soon assumed the responsibility of caring for his aging father and spinster sister. The second mayor Ellyson succeeded William C. Carrington, who had served since 1876 and announced his retirement for health reasons. During the previous several years, scandals concerning misappropriation of city funds had rocked the city council, particularly after the death of long-time city collector Aylett R. Woodson (who had served from 1876 until his death in 1887). Although the younger Ellyson held progressive views concerning labor unions, he was a conservative on race and other matters. Thus, additional black and white Republicans were soon removed from city offices and jobs, and in the fall of 1888, Democrats carried the city for President Cleveland (who however, lost the election on a national level.)

== Death and legacy ==
H.K. Ellyson survived his wife, but died of heart failure at his son's house in Richmond on November 27, 1890, aged 67. One of his grandson also had the same name, but added Cowardin as a second middle name; another grandson took his great-grandfather's name and became a preacher in Washington D.C. (Rev. Onan Ellyson died in 1901).
