= William Wemple =

William Wemple may refer to:

- William W. Wemple (1862–1933), American lawyer and politician from New York
- William W. Wemple, Jr. (1898–1972), American lawyer and politician
- William Wemple (lawyer, born 1912) (1912–2002), American lawyer from New York
