= Senator Wemple =

Senator Wemple may refer to:

- Edward Wemple (1843–1920), New York State Senate
- William W. Wemple (1862–1933), New York State Senate
