= John Wesley Turner =

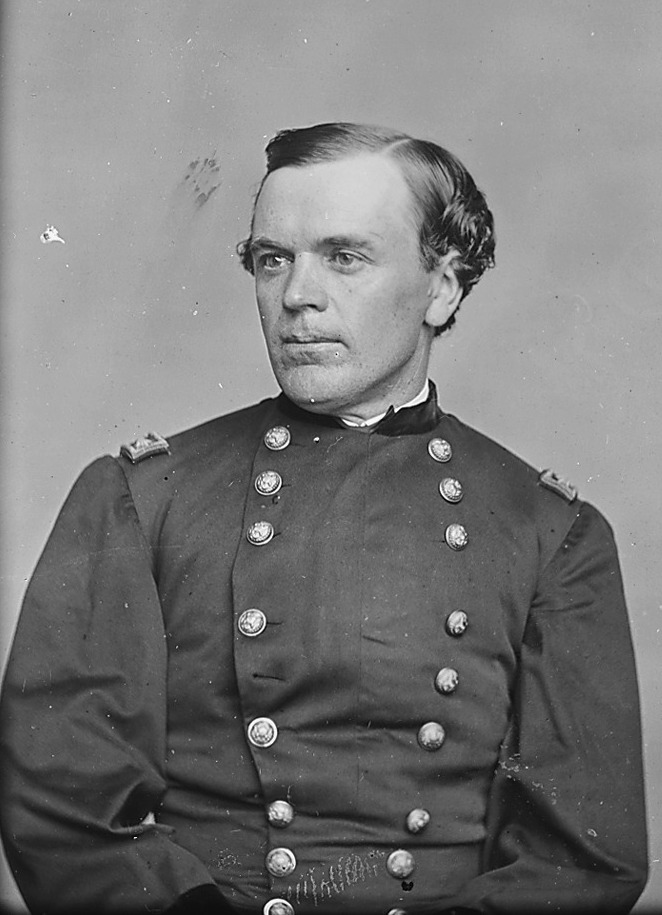
- Born: July 19, 1833; Saratoga, New York, U.S.
- Died: April 8, 1899 (aged 65); St. Louis, Missouri, U.S.
- Burial place: Calvary Cemetery and Mausoleum, St. Louis, Missouri
- Military career
- Allegiance: United States of America; Union
- Branch: United States Army; Union Army
- Service years: 1851–1871
- Rank: Brigadier General; Brevet Major General, U.S.V.
- Commands: XXIV Corps
- Conflicts: Third Seminole War; American Civil War; Battle of Fort Pulaski; Second Battle of Fort Wagner; Siege of Charleston Harbor; Bermuda Hundred campaign; Second Battle of Deep Bottom; Battle of the Crater; Battle of Fort Gregg; Battle of Appomattox

John Wesley Turner (July 19, 1833 – April 8, 1899) was a career U.S. Army officer who rose through the ranks as an artillery commander and staff officer during the American Civil War, becoming a Union Army general. Turner took a prominent part in the Appomattox campaign and early in Congressional Reconstruction was responsible for forces occupying the Department of Virginia. After his retirement from the Army as head of the depot and commissary in St. Louis, Missouri, Turner remained in the city and became a leading citizen and public works commissioner.

== Early life ==
Turner was born in New York in 1833 and was appointed to West Point at age 18. He graduated in 1855. He was assigned to the 1st U.S. Artillery and fought in the Third Seminole War.

== Civil War ==
=== Early service ===
When the Civil War began, Turner was 1st lieutenant and was quickly promoted to captain. He served on the staff of David Hunter, first in Kansas, then in the Department of the South, where he rendered valuable services at the battle of Fort Pulaski.

=== Charleston ===
On June 13, 1863, Turner was appointed chief of staff in the Department of the South under Quincy A. Gillmore. He participated in the operations against Charleston, South Carolina in 1863. On September 6, 1863, Turner was awarded a brevet promotion to Major, U.S. Army for his service at Battery Wagner. The following day, he was appointed brigadier general of U.S. Volunteers.

=== Petersburg ===
In May 1864, Gillmore's X Corps was transferred to the Petersburg front, and Turner continued as chief of staff through the Bermuda Hundred campaign. On June 22, 1864, he received his first infantry command of the war at the head of the 2nd Division, X Corps. Turner and his division participated in the siege of Petersburg, primarily north of the James River. Although held in reserve at the Battle of the Crater, Turner was nonetheless given a brevet promotion to lieutenant colonel, U.S. Army. During the Winter of 1864/1865, he served as chief of staff to the Army of the James.

=== Fort Gregg and Appomattox ===
The defeat of Confederate forces in the Shenandoah Valley freed up available units in Philip H. Sheridan's Army of the Shenandoah to be sent to the Petersburg front. In March, Turner assumed command of the so-called Independent Division of reinforcements from the recently victorious Army of the Shenandoah. Despite its name, Turner's Independent Division was attached to the newly created XXIV Corps under John Gibbon. At the end of the Petersburg Campaign, Gibbon's corps was assigned the task of assaulting Forts Gregg and Whitworth. Turner's division was split between the two forts, sending one brigade against the lesser Fort Whitworth, while the other two joined Robert S. Foster in the main thrust against Fort Gregg. With the fall of Petersburg, Turner participated in the forced march to Appomattox Courthouse, where he and other troops of the Army of the James directly intercepted Robert E. Lee and the Army of Northern Virginia. Turner was given brevet promotions to colonel, brigadier general and major general in the U.S. Army for services at Petersburg.

== Later and personal life ==
Turner remained in command of the XXIV Corps as brevet Major General of Volunteers, responsible for overseeing occupied Virginia until he was mustered out of the volunteer service on September 1, 1866. He commanded the District of Henrico, Virginia (including Richmond, the former Confederate capital city) from June 9, 1865, until April 6, 1866, and the entire Department of Virginia from April 7 until May 17. Part of his responsibility in Virginia was re-establishing the local government and persuading it to take responsibility for law enforcement as well as support for unemployed persons (both former soldiers and former slaves). This proved especially problematic, as Richmond's long-time mayor, Joseph C. Mayo used vagrancy laws against black persons, and the vast majority of those fed by soup kitchens were African Americans. Thus, Turner ordered his men not to follow Mayo's orders until Governor Francis Pierpont replaced him with city council president David J. Saunders, who was also appointed head of the city-run gasworks and waterworks.

Turner continued in the U.S. Army until 1871, and commanded the purchasing depot and commissary in St. Louis, Missouri (from October 31, 1866 – February 1871), resigning from the regular army on September 4, 1871.

In 1869, Gen. Turner married Blanche Soulard, daughter of Benjamin Soulard (1817-1884) of St. Louis, Missouri and Rose Closey (1819-1896) of Pittsburgh, Pennsylvania. They had two sons and two daughters who survived the general: Voluntine Covel Turner (1870-1933), Marie Soulard Turner Clarkson (1872-1957), John Bige Turner (1879-1914) and Blanche Turner White (1886-1919); George Soulard Turner died as an infant.

Upon retiring from the Army, Turner settled in St. Louis, Missouri, where he became a prominent citizen. He worked as a banker and civil engineer, and he served more than a decade as commissioner of streets and public works until his death.

== Death and legacy ==
General Turner died in St. Louis, survived by his widow, two sons and two daughters. He was buried in Calvary Cemetery. He was one of the subscribers who helped found Washington University in St. Louis.

== Sources ==
- Eicher, John H., and David J. Eicher. Civil War High Commands. Stanford, CA: Stanford University Press, 2001. ISBN 0-8047-3641-3.
