= Richmond Times-Dispatch =

Newspaper in Richmond, Virginia, U.S.

- Front page on June 19, 2013
- Type: Daily newspaper
- Format: Broadsheet
- Owner: Lee Enterprises
- Publisher: Kelly Till
- Founded: 1850; 176 years ago (as the Richmond Dispatch)
- Language: English
- Headquarters: 8460 Times Dispatch Blvd. Mechanicsville, VA
- Circulation: 22,907 Average print circulation 24,405 Digital Subscribers
- ISSN: 2333-7761
- OCLC number: 9493729
- Website: richmond.com

The Richmond Times-Dispatch (RTD or TD for short) is the primary daily newspaper in Richmond, Virginia, and the primary newspaper of record for the state of Virginia.

== Circulation ==
The Times-Dispatch has the second-highest circulation of any Virginia newspaper, after Norfolk's The Virginian-Pilot. In addition to the Richmond area (Petersburg, Chester, Hopewell, Colonial Heights and surrounding areas), the Times-Dispatch has substantial readership in Charlottesville, Lynchburg, and Waynesboro. As the primary paper of the state's capital, the Times-Dispatch serves as a newspaper of record for rural regions of the state that lack large local papers. The Times-Dispatch lists itself as "Virginia's News Leader" on its masthead.

In November 2025, The Times-Dispatch moved to a six day printing schedule, eliminating its printed Monday edition.

== History and notable accomplishments ==
=== Development ===
Although the Richmond Compiler was published in Virginia's capital beginning in 1815, and merged with a later newspaper called The Times, the Times and Compiler failed in 1853, despite an attempt of former banker James A. Cowardin and William H. Davis to revive it several years before. In 1850, Cowardin and Davis established a rival newspaper called the Richmond Dispatch, and by 1852 the Dispatch bragged of having circulation three times as large as any other daily paper in the city, and advertising dominated even its front page. Cowardin began his only term in the Virginia House of Delegates (as a Whig) in 1853, but many thought the city's pre-eminent paper the Richmond Examiner. John Hammersley bought half of the newspaper company in 1859, and continued as a joint publisher on the masthead until May 5, 1862, when no name appeared. By April 1861, the newspaper announced its circulation was "within a fraction of 13,000". The newspaper had been staunchly pro-slavery since 1852, and called Union soldiers "thieves and cut-throats". Most of its wartime issues are now available online. In 1864, Hammersley brought new presses from England, having run the Union blockade, although he sold half his interest to James W. Lewellen before his dangerous departure (presumably through Wilmington, North Carolina, the last Southern port open to Confederate vessels in 1864).

The Richmond Daily Dispatch published its last wartime issue on April 1, 1865; and its office was destroyed the next night during the fire set by Confederate soldiers as they left the city. However, it resumed publication on December 9, 1865, establishing a new office at 12th and Main Streets and accepting Henry K. Ellyson as part-owner as well as editor. By 1866, the Dispatch was one of five papers "carrying prestige from ante bellum days" published in Richmond (of seven newspapers). Although the newspaper initially opposed the Ku Klux Klan, the Richmond Dispatch accepted Klan advertising in 1868, as it fought Congressional Reconstruction and the Virginia Constitutional Convention of 1868. However, it later accepted the resulting state constitution (after anti-Confederate provisions were stripped) as well as allowing Negroes on juries and in the legislature. Ellyson briefly served as Richmond's mayor in 1870, selected by Richmond's city council appointed by Governor Gilbert C. Walker. After what some called the "Municipal War" because the prior appointed mayor George Chahoon refused to relinquish his office and mob violence and blockades, the Virginia Supreme Court declared Ellyson the mayor but awaited elections. After skullduggery concerning stolen ballots in the pro-Chahoon Jackson Ward and the election commission declared Ellyson the winner, he refused to serve under the resulting cloud, leading to yet another problematic election won by the Conservative Party candidate. The revived Dispatch later opposed former Confederate General William Mahone and his Readjuster Party. After James Cowardin died in 1882, his son Charles took the helm (with Ellyson's assistance, and with Ellyson family members handling business operations), and the paper stopped supporting Negro rights, instead criticizing Del. John Mercer Langston with racial stereotypes.

In 1886, Lewis Ginter founded the Richmond Daily Times. A year later, lawyer Joseph Bryan (1845–1908) bought the Daily Times from Ginter, beginning the paper's long association with the Bryan family. Bryan and Ginter had previously helped revitalize the Tanner & Delany Engine Company, transforming it into the Richmond Locomotive Works, which had 800 employees by 1893 and built 200 locomotives per year. In 1890, the Daily Times changed its name to the Richmond Times. In 1896, Bryan acquired the eight-year-old rival Manchester Leader and launched the Evening Leader. In 1899, the evening Richmond News was founded. John L. Williams, owner of the Dispatch, bought the News in 1900.

By 1903, it was obvious Richmond was not big enough to support four papers. That year, Williams and Bryan agreed to merge Richmond's main newspapers. The morning papers merged to become the Richmond Times-Dispatch under Bryan's ownership, while the evening papers merged to become The Richmond News Leader under Williams' ownership. Bryan bought the News Leader in 1908, but died later that year. (Joseph Bryan Park was donated by his widow, Isobel ("Belle") Stewart Bryan, and named for him).

His son John Stewart Bryan had given up his own legal career in 1900 to become a reporter working for the Dispatch and helped found the Associated Press and then became vice-president of the publishing company. Upon his father's death, John Stewart Bryan became owner and publisher of the two papers, but in 1914 sold a controlling interest in the Times-Dispatch to three families. He hired Douglas Southall Freeman as editor of the News Leader in 1915, and remained in control until becoming President of the College of William and Mary in 1934 (and publishing a biography of his father the following year). John Stewart Bryan reacquired the Times-Dispatch in 1940 when the two papers' business interests merged to form Richmond Newspapers, in which Bryan held a 54-percent interest. That conglomeration is now known as Media General. Other publishers in the Bryan family include D. Tennant Bryan and John Stewart Bryan III.

In 1948, Virginius Dabney won the Pulitzer Prize for Editorial Writing while editorializing for the Times-Dispatch.

On June 1, 1992, four days after its sponsored contestant Amanda Goad won the Scripps National Spelling Bee, the News Leader, which had been losing circulation for many years, ceased publication and was folded into the Times-Dispatch.

In 2021, Times-Dispatch columnist Michael Paul Williams was awarded the Pulitzer Prize for Commentary for his writing about the protest movements in Richmond in the wake of the murder of George Floyd leading to the removal of many Confederate monuments. Williams joined the paper in 1982 and has been a columnist since 1992.

=== 2004 Mosul attack ===
The Richmond Times-Dispatch drew national attention for its coverage of a December 21, 2004, attack by a suicide bomber on an American military base in Mosul, Iraq. The deadliest attack on an American military installation since the war began, the attack injured 69 people and killed 22, including two with the Virginia National Guard's Richmond-based 276th Engineer Battalion. Stories and photographs about the attack by a Times-Dispatch reporter embedded with the 276th were read, heard and seen across the nation.

=== Tacky Christmas lights tour ===
In 1990, The RTD borrowed an idea from a local entrepreneur, Barry "Mad Dog" Gottlieb, to encourage a "Tacky Christmas Lights Tour", also known by locals as the "Tacky Light Tour". Every week, the RTD lists the addresses of houses where the most tacky Christmas lights can be found. In 2004, Matt Burgess created a website devoted to Richmond's Tacky Light Tour, which led to it being featured on the Crazy Christmas Lights show on The Learning Channel (TLC). The international exposure from the recurring TLC broadcast led to this tradition becoming popular in other cities, like Fairfax, Virginia (DC area) as well as San Francisco, Los Angeles and Birmingham, Alabama.

=== Media General sale to Berkshire Hathaway ===
On May 17, 2012, Media General announced the sale of its newspaper division to BH Media, a subsidiary of Warren Buffett's Berkshire Hathaway company. The sale included all of Media General's newspapers except The Tampa Tribune and its associated publications. Berkshire Hathaway bought 63 newspapers for $142 million and, as part of the deal, offered Media General a $400 million term loan at 10.5 percent interest that would mature in 2020 and a $45 million revolving line of credit. Berkshire Hathaway received a seat on Media General's board of directors and an option to purchase a 19.9% stake in the company. The deal closed on June 25, 2012.

=== Lee Enterprises acquisition ===
Lee Enterprises acquired the Richmond Times-Dispatch and eight other Virginia newspapers they already manage for Berkshire Hathaway in March 2020 as part of a larger $140 million deal that included 111 publications across 10 states. In July 2022, Kelly Till became the first female publisher of the paper. In September 2024, the newspaper laid off two sports writers. More staff were laid off a year later.

== Political associations ==
Diane Cantor, the wife of former Republican House Majority Leader Eric Cantor, sat on Media General's Board of Directors from 2005 to 2017. This drew some conflict-of-interest allegations because the RTD served much of the then-congressman's 7th district, but no evidence surfaced that she was involved in the paper's content. Her association with the paper was noted at the end of Times-Dispatch stories about Rep. Cantor.

== Content ==
=== Commentary, opinion, and editorials ===
A prominent newspaper in the state, the Times-Dispatch frequently features commentary from important figures from around Virginia, such as officials and presidents from Virginia Commonwealth University, the College of William and Mary, and the University of Virginia. Former Richmond Mayor Douglas Wilder, who had articles published in the paper before he held that position, often outlined policies his administration was implementing. During the 2004 U.S. presidential campaign, its Commentary sections featured some pieces by Retired Admiral Roy Hoffmann, a founding member of the Swift Boat Veterans for Truth and resident of Richmond suburb Chesterfield, against Democratic candidate John Kerry.

Editorially, the Times-Dispatch has historically leaned conservative. It supported many of former president George W. Bush's policies, including the 2003 invasion of Iraq and a flat income tax. However, the paper is not unilaterally conservative; for example, a 2005 editorial called for the then House Majority Leader Tom DeLay to relinquish his leadership position on ethical grounds. There are also some liberal syndicated columnists who appear frequently, especially Leonard Pitts.

During the Civil Rights Movement, the Times-Dispatch, like nearly every major newspaper in Virginia, was an ardent supporter of segregation.

In the 2016 presidential election, the Times-Dispatch endorsed Libertarian candidate Gary Johnson over major party candidates Donald Trump and Hillary Clinton. Clinton's running mate, Tim Kaine, is a Richmond resident who served as mayor of the city from 1998 to 2001. From at least 1980 until its Johnson endorsement in 2016, the Times-Dispatch had only endorsed Republican presidential candidates.

=== Sports ===
Like most major papers, the sports section has MLB, NASCAR, MLS, NBA, NCAA, NFL, and NHL scores and results. The Times-Dispatch sports pages naturally focus on Richmond and Virginia professional and college teams, especially VCU, Richmond, Virginia, and Virginia Tech. In addition, the paper covers the Richmond Flying Squirrels and Richmond Kickers, as well as Washington-based teams such as the Washington Commanders and Washington Nationals. "Virginians in the Pros" and similar features track all sorts of professional athletes who were born, lived in, or attended college in Virginia. Large automobile racing events like the Sprint Cup (at the Richmond International Raceway) are often given a separate preview guide.

Half a page to a whole page most days is dedicated to outdoors articles. The "Scoreboard", which features minor-league standings, sports-betting, and other sports scores, also gives tide measurements, river levels, and skiing conditions, depending on the season.

Virginians have traditionally been highly supportive of high school athletics, and its flagship paper is a testament to that. Particular emphasis is given to American football and basketball; The Times-Dispatch ranks area teams in these sports, in the style of the NCAA polls, and generally updates them weekly. In the fall, Sunday editions have the scores of all high school football games played that weekend from across the state. Prep games are also receive above-average coverage in baseball, cross country, golf, lacrosse, soccer, softball, swimming, tennis, track and field, and volleyball. Stories are frequently done on notable prep athletes, such as those from foreign countries, those with disabilities, those who play a multitude of sports, or those who had little or no prior experience in a sport which they now excel in.

=== Business ===
The business desk consists only of six reporters; they cover technology, retail, energy, insurance, banking, economics, real estate, manufacturing, transportation and consumer issues. Unlike many newspapers, the Times-Dispatch produces a widely read Monday business section, Metro Business. It contains a center cover story on a regional business-related issue and is filled with events for the coming week, advice columnists and gadget reviews. In June 2006, the decision was made to remove the stock tables from the daily sections beginning July 15 and replace the numerous pages with a "Markets Review" section for subscribers who request it. The stock section was eliminated in 2009, as was the Sunday Real Estate section (both were cost-cutting moves). The Sunday Business section, which had been a showcase of general business-interest stories and features, has been rechristened Moneywise and now features primarily consumer-related coverage. Moneywise is also among select Sunday business sections nationwide that print Wall Street Journal Sunday pages.

=== Photography ===
In August 2019, the RTD publicized on its pages a large book of photos and text relating to the history of the Richmond Times-Dispatch newspaper, offering a substantial discount to online readers. Staff photographer Bob Brown was asked to write about his long association with the newspaper, and his resulting article was "The Summer of '69".

== Controversy ==
On July 12, 2006, Richmond-based news magazine Style Weekly ran a cover story titled "Truth and Consequences", a piece that took a look at the Times-Dispatch's operations as the paper settled into its first year with new management. The report described new editor Glenn Proctor, who took over on November 14, 2005, as an "inelegant, blunt and harsh critic—to the point of saying, repeatedly, that some reporters' work 'sucks.'" The piece described a newsroom teetering on the edge, preparing for promised changes—such as possible layoffs, fewer pages and combined sections—that eventually were realized. On April 2, 2009, the Times-Dispatch cut 90 jobs, laying off 59 workers, including 28 newsroom jobs. Proctor left the paper in 2011.

== Syndicated columnists ==
Notable columnists published include:

- Victor Davis Hanson
- Charles Krauthammer
- Kathleen Parker
- Leonard Pitts
- Robert J. Samuelson
- Marc Thiessen
- Cal Thomas
- George F. Will
- Walter E. Williams

== See also ==
- Douglas Southall Freeman
- Virginius Dabney
- List of newspapers in Virginia
