= Wyndham Robertson =

Governor of Virginia (1803–1888)

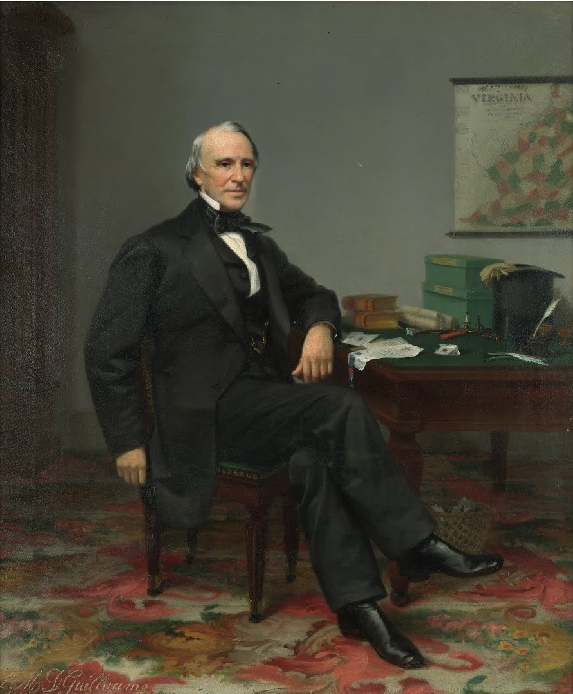
- Portrait of Wyndham Robertson ca. 1880 by L.M.D. Guillaume

Acting Governor of Virginia
- In office 1836–1837
- Preceded by: Littleton Waller Tazewell as Governor
- Succeeded by: David Campbell as Governor

Virginia House of Delegates
- In office 1838–1841
- Preceded by: Robert Stanard
- Succeeded by: Raleigh T. Daniel
- Constituency: Richmond, Virginia

Virginia House of Delegates
- In office 1859–1865 Serving with Gustavus A. Myers, David J. Saunders (1859-1860); John O. Stegar, Thomas H. Wynne, Thomas B. Bigger (1861-1863); David I. Burr, David J. Saunders (1863-1865)
- Preceded by: Joseph R. Anderson
- Succeeded by: Peachy R. Grattan
- Constituency: Richmond, Virginia

Personal details
- Born: January 26, 1803 near Manchester, Chesterfield County, Virginia, US
- Died: February 11, 1888 (aged 85) Abingdon, Virginia, US
- Party: Whig
- Spouse: Mary Trigg Smith
- Children: 4 daughters, 2 sons
- Occupation: lawyer, farmer, businessman

Wyndham Robertson (26 January 1803 – 11 February 1888) was the Acting Governor of the U.S. state of Virginia from 1836 to 1837. He also twice served multiple terms in the Virginia House of Delegates, the second series representing Richmond during the American Civil War.

A Whig, Robertson advocated for the United States during the secession crisis that precipitated the Civil War. However, after Lincoln's call for troops, he joined in Virginia's secession. After the war, he became a member of the Committee of Nine that helped usher Virginia back into the Union without imposing disabilities upon former Confederates. Towards the end of his life, Robertson published a book about Pocahontas and her descendants, including himself.

== Early life and family ==
He was born in 1803 near Manchester, in Chesterfield County, Virginia across the James River from Richmond, to William Robertson (1750–1829) and his wife Elizabeth Bolling, who was descended from Pocahontas and John Rolfe. His paternal grandfather Archibald Robertson emigrated from Scotland to become a factor (tobacco merchant) on the James River. His father was a member of the Virginia Council of State. Robertson's elder brothers included Thomas B. Robertson (1779–1828), who became Governor of Louisiana, and John Robertson (1787–1823), who became a U.S. Congressman. Wyndham Robertson attended private schools in Richmond. He graduated from The College of William and Mary in 1821 and read law.

In 1831, Robertson married Mary Trigg Smith, daughter of Captain Francis Smith (d.1843) of Washington County, Virginia, who served the Continental Army and in the Virginia Senate during the War of 1812. They had at least four daughters—Mary Robertson (1834–1866), Elizabeth Robinson (1837- ), Kate Robertson White (1845–1922), Pocahontas (1847–1923), and two sons—Francis Smith Robertson (1841–1926), and Wyndham Robertson Jr. (1851–1923).

== Career ==
Admitted to the Virginia bar in 1824, Robertson made a short trip to Paris and London three years later. In 1830 legislators elected him to Virginia's Council of State, where his late father had sat. Robertson was re-elected to the Council of State in 1833. In 1834, at the first meeting of the James River Canal Company, Robertson suggested that instead of constructing a canal to Lynchburg and attempting to extend it across the Appalachian Mountains to the Kanawha River, the company instead construct a railroad, which could ultimately continue to the Mississippi River.

On March 31, 1836, Robertson became the Council of State's senior member, Lieutenant-Governor of Virginia. When Governor Littleton Waller Tazewell resigned that same day, Robertson became (acting) governor. Since the Virginia General Assembly, which elected the Governor, was Democratic, and he, being a Whig, was not, Robertson was not elected Governor when that term expired in 1837 and was replaced by David Campbell. Richmond voters then elected Robertson as their representative in the Virginia House of Delegates for the 1838 session; he replaced Robert Stanard whom legislators elected to the Court of Appeals. Richmond voters re-elected Robertson for three successive sessions, until 1841, when Raleigh T. Daniel replaced him as Richmond's delegate.

In 1841, Robertson moved to his wife's home, "Mary's Meadows", just south of Abingdon, in southwest Virginia, and farmed. He was made a Justice of the Peace for Washington County on July 25, 1842, and a trustee of Abingdon Academy in 1843, shortly before his father-in-law's death. In 1849, Robertson chaired a meeting to elect delegates to extend the Virginia and Tennessee Railroad to town. In 1850, Robertson leased the King Saltworks for five years. Thomas L. Preston had leased them the previous years and would again lease them in 1858. Salt production in those days used enslaved labor to keep fires burning to evaporate brine, and the salines which came to be run by Stuart, Palmer, and Parker by 1863 helped supply much of the salt required by the Southern States.

== Enslaver, Unionist, and legislator in the American Civil War ==
In 1858, Robertson returned to Richmond. He had owned 11 enslaved persons in the 1840 U.S. Federal Census, and at least 28 enslaved persons in the 1850 U.S. Federal Census. His father-in-law Capt. Francis Smith had enslaved 107 people in the 1840 census, of whom 20 were engaged in farming. In the 1860 census, Robertson owned seven enslaved persons in Richmond and at least 75 enslaved persons in Washington County, Virginia.

In 1859, Richmond voters again elected Robertson to the Virginia House of Delegates as one of their three delegates in the 1859-1861 session based on the representational changes after adopting the Virginia Constitution of 1850 and population shifts documented in the census. As Virginia struggled with the idea of seceding from the United States, Robertson was a staunch Unionist and tried to prevent its secession. He later characterized himself as a "friend to peace and the Union" and noted that he had actively opposed South Carolina's call for a Southern Convention in 1859. At the Henry Clay banquet in April 1860, at which former President John Tyler was present, Robertson gave "The Union" toast, followed by a short speech:

The Constitutional Union of the States" - The Union of the States is the harmony of the spheres. While obedient to the laws of their creation, they sing ever as they go 'glad tidings of great joy' to all the world. Rebelling against them, light and joy are swallowed up in darkness, and order falls back into primordial chaos.

After South Carolina and several other states started seceding in the winter of 1860–61, Robertson still advocated against Virginia following suit. On January 7, 1861, he presented the "Anti-Coercion Resolution", which rejected secession, but stated that if the Federal government used coercion toward the seceded states, Virginia would fight, which was duly adopted. When President Abraham Lincoln made his call for troops on April 15, 1861, Robertson believed the Anti-Coercion scenario met and was "from that time forth zealously active in all measures for the defence of his State." Virginia seceded after voters approved a referendum the following month.

And now, after twenty years' experience of yet unripened results, I have no regrets, nor repent a single act of my State, or myself, in these unhappy affairs - welcoming the end of slavery, but still believing it would have been reached without the horrors of war.
-- Wyndham Robertson

Robertson continued as the leading vote-getter within Richmond's delegation to the House of Delegates for two additional terms; his legislative service ended as the Confederacy fell in 1865. In 1863, Robertson opposed and helped to defeat a bill to fix food prices, which he believed "fraught with the direst mischief", despite food riots in Richmond. When Richmond citizens presented a resolution asking their representatives to support a similar bill or resign, Robertson refused. When he found that his colleagues had already acquiesced, he resigned so as not to misrepresent his constituents. The House, however, requested that his resignation be withdrawn until the wishes of his constituents could be determined. A formal poll was held, and it was determined that a majority did not support the bill, so Robertson retained his seat.

== Postwar ==
After the war, Robertson moved back to Abingdon. During Congressional Reconstruction, Robertson was a member of the Committee of Nine, led by Alexander H. H. Stuart, that sought Virginia's readmission to the Union. At issue was the new state constitution, which included a provision disenfranchising former Confederates, which went beyond the terms of surrender. The committee successfully negotiated with President Ulysses S. Grant and others in the Federal government to have that clause voted on separately. It was defeated, but the remainder of the new state constitution (without the former version's pro-slavery provisions) was adopted so that Virginia could rejoin the Union.

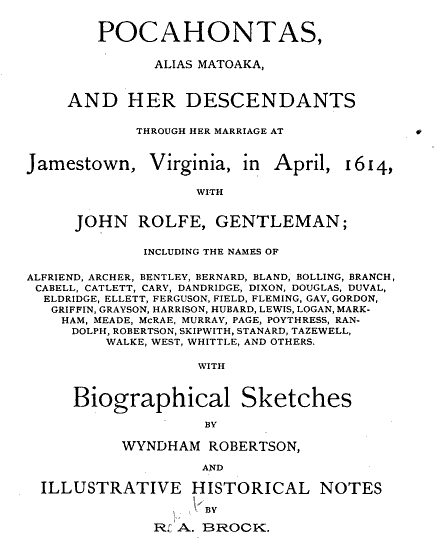
Title page, Pocahontas, alias Matoaka, and Her Descendants through Her Marriage at Jamestown, Virginia, in April, 1614, with John Rolfe, Gentleman, written by Robertson and published at Richmond, 1887

After the American Civil War, some Northern writers began questioning the validity of the rescue story of Captain John Smith and Pocahontas, attacking the accounts of the historical role played by both as well as that of her husband John Rolfe. Harvard historian Henry Adams, who had served as his secretary to his father, Charles Francis Adams, Lincoln's Ambassador to Britain during the American Civil War, helped the debunkers. Robertson noted his descent from John Adams, a rival of John Randolph of Roanoke, who was descended from Pocahontas. Among several Virginians replying, Robertson published Pocahontas alias Matoaka and Her Descendants through Her Marriage with John Rolfe. His thesis was that because her descendants were notable, so was she. Tracing her descendants, who included the First Families of Virginia including the Bollings, Branches, Lewises, Randolphs, and Pages, as well as his own family, Robertson wrote, "History, poetry, and art have vied with one another in investing her name from that day to the present with a halo of surpassing brightness."

== Death and legacy ==
Wyndham Robertson died on February 11, 1888, and was buried near his parents at Cobbs Cemetery, Enon, Chesterfield County.

The Library of Virginia has his papers as governor and other correspondence, including of the Buena Vista Plaster Company run by his sons after his death. The special collections of the University of Chicago Library also have many boxes of family correspondence, including with Confederate generals during the Civil War and with various historians, as well as concerning the Loyal Company (of which his father-in-law was a shareholder). Governor Robertson was an early donor to Emory and Henry College, which endowed the Robertson prize medal for "encouraging oratory".

== Notes ==
Political offices
Preceded by Littleton Waller Tazewell; Governor	Acting Governor of Virginia; 1836–1837	Succeeded by David Campbell; Governor
Preceded by Robert Stanard	Virginia House of Delegates; 1838–1841	Succeeded by Raleigh T. Daniel
