= Henry H. Persons =

American businessman, banker, and politician from New York

Henry H Persons

Member of the New York State Senate from the 31st district
- In office 1894–1895
- Preceded by: Matthias Endres
- Succeeded by: George Chahoon

Personal details
- Born: December 16, 1851 East Aurora, New York, U.S.
- Died: November 10, 1925 (aged 73)

Henry H. Persons (December 16, 1851 – November 10, 1925) was an American businessman, banker, and politician from New York.

== Life ==
Persons was born on December 16, 1851, in East Aurora, New York, the son of Henry Ziba Persons, an East Aurora businessman, postmaster, and bank president, and Mary White.

Persons began attending Cornell University in 1871, but left the school after a year. When he was 22, he began working at his father's store and later received a half interest in the store. In 1882, he became cashier of the Bank of East Aurora. In 1887, he sold the store and focused exclusively on banking. In 1901, he succeeded his father as president of the bank. He was elected vice-president of the Buffalo Commercial Bank in 1898 and later became its president. When the Buffalo Commercial Bank was sold to the Marine National Bank in 1903, he became vice-president of the latter bank until 1904. He was also an organizer, vice-president, director, and president of the Frontier Telephone Company, president of the Hayes Lithograph Company and the J. W. Ruger Manufacturing Company of Buffalo, and a director of the Union Fire Insurance Company.

In 1883, Persons was elected town supervisor. He was a delegate to the 1892 Republican National Convention. In 1893, he was elected to the New York State Senate as a Republican, representing New York's 31st State Senate district. He served in the Senate in 1894 and 1895. In the Senate he was chairman of the Committee on Canals and played a key role in procuring nine million dollars for canal appropriations, and served on a special committee to investigate the murder of Robert Ross. In 1905, Governor Higgins appointed him President of the State Water Supply Commission.

Persons was a trustee of the First Presbyterian Church of East Aurora. In 1876, he married Rebecca Ellen Sandford. Their children were Richard Sandford, James White, Mary Hungerford, Albert H., Henry Z., and Robert H. James attended Cornell and practiced law in Buffalo.

Persons died in East Aurora on November 10, 1925. He was buried in East Aurora Cemetery.

New York State Senate
Preceded by Matthias Endres	New York State Senate; 31st District; 1894–1895	Succeeded by George Chahoon
