= Spencer G. Prime =

American politician

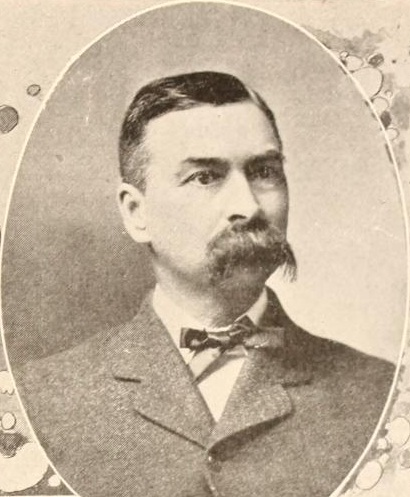
Spencer G. Prime (1902)

Spencer Gilchrist Prime (April 10, 1851 – June 18, 1926) was an American merchant and politician from New York.

== Life ==
He was born on April 10, 1851, in Jay, Essex County, New York. He attended the public schools and Plattsburgh Academy. Then he taught school; later became a clerk in a store; and eventually opened his own business, dealing wholesale and retail in general merchandise.

He was Supervisor of the Town of Jay in 1881; and a member of the New York State Assembly (Essex Co.) in 1887 and 1888.

Prime was a member of the New York State Senate (31st D.) from 1901 to 1906, sitting in the 124th, 125th, 126th, 127th, 128th and 129th New York State Legislatures.

He died on June 18, 1926; and was buried at the Mountain View Cemetery in Upper Jay.

He had a son, Raymond Case Prime (ca. 1892 - 1963) who lived in Lake Placid. Raymond was married to Mary Featherston of Ausable Forks, NY and had 3 children, Theodore, R.Case and Georganna Prime. Another son died in early childhood.

Assemblyman Spencer G. Prime II (born 1882) was his nephew.

== Sources ==
New York State Assembly
Preceded by Wesley Barnes	New York State Assembly; Essex County; 1887–1888	Succeeded by Thomas J. Treadway
New York State Senate
Preceded by George Chahoon	New York State Senate; 31st District; 1901–1906	Succeeded by William W. Wemple
