= Boush–Tazewell House =

Historic house in Virginia, United States

- U.S. National Register of Historic Places
- Virginia Landmarks Register
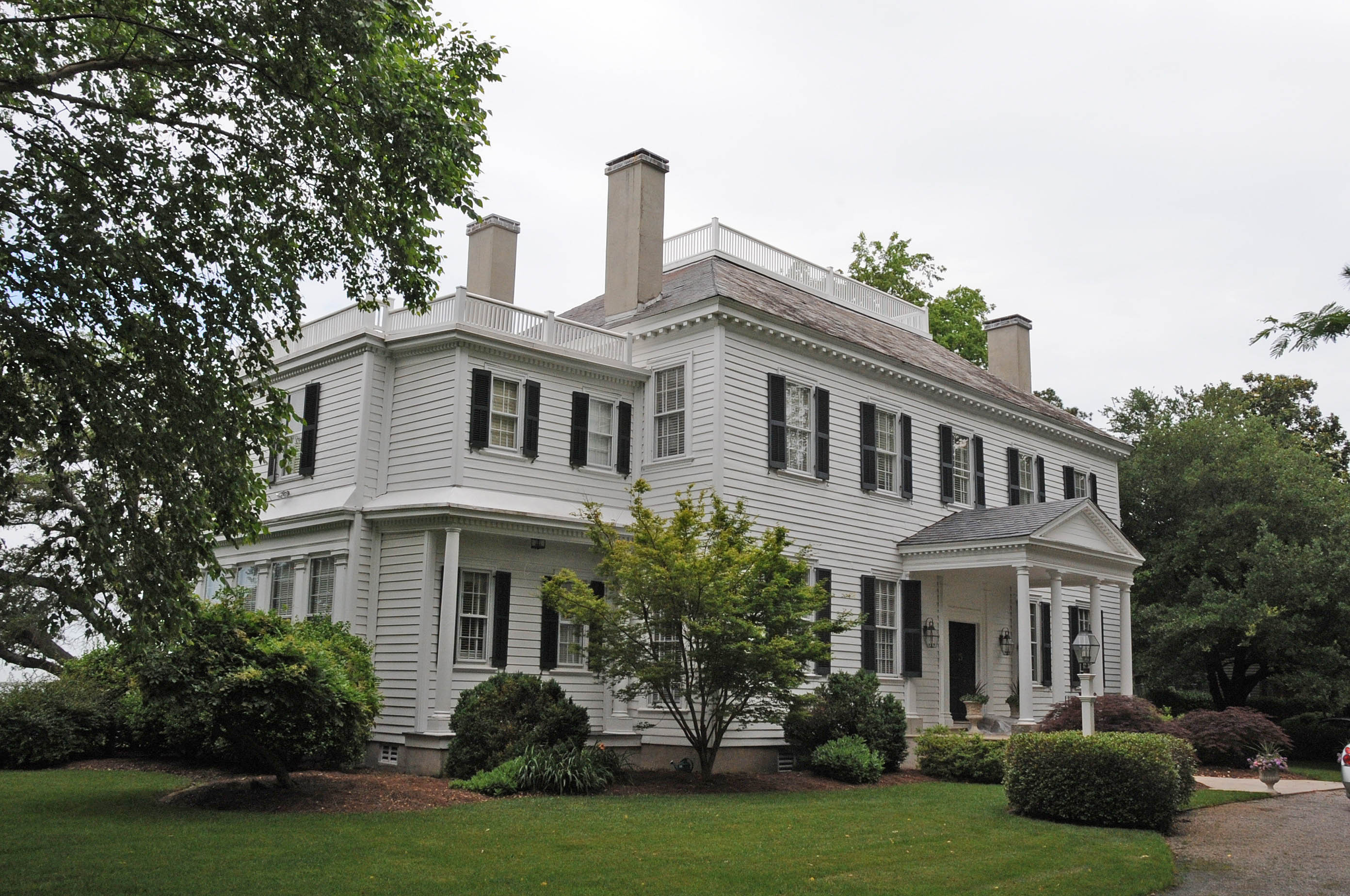

- Location within Virginia Location within the United States
- Location: 6225 Powhatan Ave., Norfolk, Virginia
- Coordinates: 36°54′01″N 76°18′49″W
- Area: Less than 1 acre (0.40 ha)
- Built: 1783-1784
- Architectural style: Georgian
- NRHP reference No.: 74002238
- VLR No.: 122-0002

Significant dates
- Added to NRHP: July 18, 1974
- Designated VLR: February 19, 1974

Boush–Tazewell House is a historic home located at Norfolk, Virginia, USA. It was built about 1783–1784, and is a two-story, Georgian frame house, five bays wide and two bays deep, with a slate covered deck-on-hip roof. It has a two-level, tetrastyle pedimented portico supported by slender Tuscan order columns on both levels. It originally stood in downtown Norfolk and was completely dismantled and re-erected in its present location around 1902. The house was purchased in 1810 by Congressman, Senator and Governor Littleton Waller Tazewell (1775-1860). His family continued to occupy the house until 1894.

It was listed on the National Register of Historic Places in 1974.
