= David J. Saunders =

American politician (1811–1873)

Member of the Virginia House of Delegates from the Richmond district
- In office December 5, 1859 – December 1, 1861 Serving with Wyndham Robertson, Gustavus A. Myers
- Preceded by: Roscoe B. Heath
- Succeeded by: John O. Stegar
- In office September 7, 1863 – March 15, 1865 Serving with Wyndham Robertson, David I. Burr
- Preceded by: John O. Stegar
- Succeeded by: T. J. Evans

44th Mayor of Richmond, Virginia
- In office July 3, 1865 – May __, 1870
- Preceded by: Joseph C. Mayo
- Succeeded by: George Chahoon

Personal details
- Born: January 25, 1811 Henrico County, Virginia, U.S.
- Died: June 12, 1873 (aged 62) Richmond, Virginia, U.S.
- Resting place: Hollywood Cemetery
- Spouse: Maria Hope
- Children: David J. Saunders Jr. (d. 1872)
- Occupation: businessman, politician

David J. Saunders (January 25, 1811 – June 12, 1873) was a Virginia businessman and politician. He served two terms representing the City of Richmond in the Virginia House of Delegates, and was President of Richmond's City Council during the American Civil War. After the city's surrender and during two periods during which Union military authorities removed long-time and pro-Confederate mayor Joseph C. Mayo, Saunders in effect managed the city, especially its waterworks and gasworks.

== Early and family life ==
Born in Virginia early in 1811, possibly to John H. Saunders, the principal of Richmond's male orphanage and his wife Sally (the institution's matron). David J. Saunders married Maria Hope in Louisa, Virginia, on December 10, 1829. They had at least two sons and two daughters. David J. Saunders probably owned four slaves in 1840. He owned at least one enslaved person in 1850. By 1860 Saunders owned at least 39 slaves.

== Career ==
By 1850 Saunders operated a grocery in Richmond, Virginia, while his 12 and 8 year old sons David Saunders Jr. and John Saunders and their sisters Sarah (age 14) and Maria (age 10) attended school. The grocer and distiller who prospered in Richmond shortly after this man's death was Edmund Archer Saunders (1831-1898), son of Isaac Taylor Saunders and who before the war operated a grocery at "Piney Grove" in Charles City County. E.A. Saunders' mansion in what was then Richmond's West End is now Founders Hall of Virginia Commonwealth University.

== American Civil War ==
Richmond's voters elected Saunders as one of their three representatives (a part-time position) in the Virginia House of Delegates in 1859. He failed to win re-election in 1861, although he again won election in 1863.

After the Confederate government left Richmond on April 2, 1865, departing Confederate troops burned the tobacco storehouses as mayor Mayo and city council president Saunders had feared and despite their pleas. The resulting conflagration destroyed much of the city. Early the following morning, Mayo rode his carriage eastward out of the city, seeking a Union officer to whom to surrender Richmond, as well as plead for assistance in suppressing the fire. Occupation authorities soon removed Mayo from office, although when the Union-sympathizing Virginia Governor, Francis Pierpont, arrived in Richmond on May 26, he allowed mayor Mayo to resume office.

When Congressional Reconstruction began, Virginia's military administrator, Gen. John Wesley Turner, responded to complaints about vigilantes rounding up blacks and charging them as vagrants in the mayor's court (where mayor Mayo threatened to return them to slavery) by instructing his subordinates not to obey directions from mayor Mayo nor other city officials. General Turner issued another order prohibiting the organization of the new city council when Richmonders appeared to elect lawyer and former Confederate colonel Nathaniel A. Sturdivant as mayor and six other former Confederates to lesser positions. Under pressure from federal authorities, Sturdivant declined to accept office, so Gen. Turner asked Saunders to continue as city manager, operating the gas and water works.

Governor Pierpont formally removed mayor Mayo from office, then on July 3, 1865, appointed Saunders Richmond's mayor to replace him. However, when municipal elections were again held on April 6, 1866, voters attempted to return Mayo to office. The military governor during Congressional Reconstruction (now Gen. John Schofield) again removed Mayo from office on May 4, this time appointing New York-born George Chahoon as Richmond's mayor on May 6, 1866. Meanwhile, banker William H. MacFarland succeeded Saunders as city council President. However, even federal census-takers in 1870 still considered Saunders the city's mayor.

== Death ==
Saunders died on June 12, 1873. He was buried in Hollywood Cemetery.
