= 25th Virginia Infantry Regiment =

- Flag of Virginia, 1861
- Active: May 1861 – April 1865
- Disbanded: April 1865
- Country: Confederate States of America
- Allegiance: Virginia
- Branch: Confederate States Army
- Type: Infantry
- Nickname(s): Heck’s Regiment
- Engagements: American Civil War: Battle of Rich Mountain; Battle of Cheat Mountain; Jackson's Valley Campaign; Seven Days' Battles; Second Battle of Bull Run; Battle of Antietam; Battle of Fredericksburg; Siege of Suffolk; Battle of Gettysburg; Battle of Cold Harbor; Valley Campaigns of 1864; Appomattox Campaign

Commanders
- Notable commanders: Colonel George Hugh Smith; Lt. Colonel Robert D. Lilley

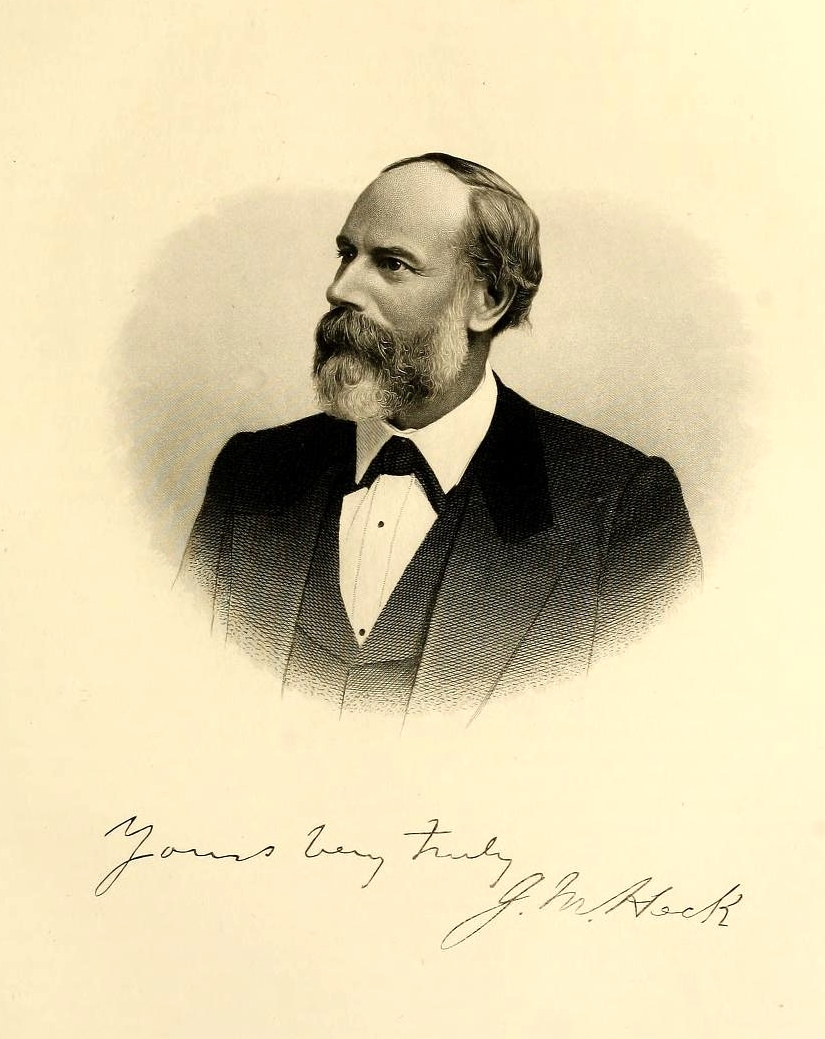
Col. Jonathan McGee Heck

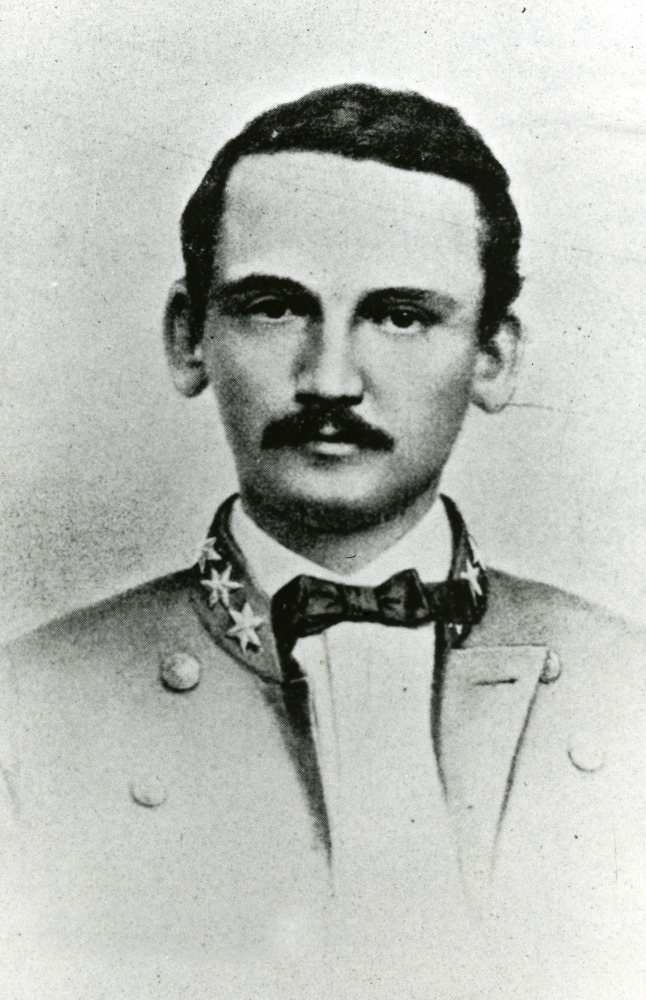
Col. John C. Higginbotham

The 25th Virginia Infantry Regiment was an infantry regiment raised in Virginia for service in the Confederate States Army during the American Civil War. It fought mostly with the Army of the Northwest and Army of Northern Virginia. Its soldiers saw action from the battle of Philippi until the Appomattox.

== Service ==
The 25th Virginia was organized during the early summer of 1861. Its members were raised in Upshur, Augusta, Highland, Bath, Pendleton, and Rockbridge counties. The unit participated in Lee's Cheat Mountain Campaign and Jackson's Valley Campaign. In the spring of 1862 the 9th Battalion, Virginia Infantry, four companies from Taylor County under the command of Lt. Colonel George W. Hansbrough that had fought in the Army of the Northwest and fought at Greenbrier River and Camp Allegheny were merged into the 25th Virginia. After the July 11, 1861, Battle of Rich Mountain, the regiment was severely depleted due to Col. Pegram's surrender of Camp Garnett, as discussed below.

Members of 1st Co. A (Upshur Grays) and 1st Co. B (Rockbridge Guards) were dispatched to Hart's Farm under command of Capt. Julius A. DeLagnel to ward off an expected Federal assault. Men of the 20th VA and 25th VA, along with a lone cannon took position in the stable yard of the Hart farm and awaited the Federal assault. As the Federals appeared on the hillside, the long-awaited battle began. The small (310 men) force of Confederates held back the initial attacks, but overwhelming numbers, along with a final charge of the 19th Ohio forced the surviving members of the Confederate outpost to flee. The following morning, being cut off and surrounded, Col. Pegram surrendered the balance of his command at Camp Garnett, including the majority of the 25th VA. The 25th lost 5 killed, 11 wounded, and 2 captured at Hart's farm. Included in the dead were Upshur Gray privates Henry Clay Jackson and Oscar Sherwood, whose names can be seen engraved in the rock that they defended to this day.

After Jackson's campaign finished, the regiment was assigned to General Early's, J.R. Jones', and W. Terry's Brigade, Army of Northern Virginia. The order to merge the 9th Battalion was rescinded in November 1862, and its men were divided among other commands. The 25th Virginia participated in the Jones-Imboden Raid during the spring of 1863, as Confederates sought to discourage West Virginia statehood, but failed. While depleted, the 25th Virginia took an active part in the campaigns of the army from the Seven Days' Battles to Cold Harbor, then fought with Early in the Shenandoah Valley and in various conflicts around Appomattox.

== Casualties ==
This regiment reported 18 casualties at Camp Alleghany, 72 at McDowell, and 29 at Cross Keys and Port Republic. It lost 1 killed and 24 wounded at Cedar Mountain, had 3 killed and 20 wounded at Sharpsburg, and reported 1 killed and 13 wounded at Fredericksburg. Of the 280 engaged at Gettysburg, twenty-five percent were disabled. There were 15 members (1 officer, 14 enlisted) of the 25th at Appomattox on April 9, 1865.

== Officers ==
The field officers were: Brigadier General John C. Higginbotham (Posthumous), Colonels George A. Porterfield, and George H. Smith; Lieutenant Colonels Patrick B. Duffy, Jonathan McGee Heck, Robert D. Lilley, and John A. Robinson; and Majors Wilson Harper, Albert G. Reger, and William T. Thompson.

== Companies ==
- Company A, Upshur Grays, Col. John C. Higginbotham
- Company B, Rockbridge Guards, Capt. David P. Curry
- Company C, Augusta Lee Rifles, Capt. Robert D. Lilley
- Company D, Highland Rangers, Capt. George M. Kiracofe
- Company E, Pendleton Rifles, Capt. George H. Smith
- Company F, Franklin Guards, Capt. John B. Moomau
- Company G, Bath Grays/Bath Rifles, Capt. William D. Ervin
- Company H, Hardy Blues, Capt. J.C.B. Mullin
- Company I, Mt. Crawford Cavalry, formerly Valley Rifles, Capt. William N. Jordan
- Company K, South Branch Riflemen, Capt. John H. Everly

When the regiment was reorganized in 1862 to bring it back to full strength the following companies were added from the 9th Battalion Virginia Infantry

- Company A, Letcher Guards, Capt. John A. Robinson
- Company C, Braxton Blues, Capt. Patrick B. Duffy
- Company E, Fighting Company E (composed from several parts of depleted companies)
- Company F, Highland County, Capt. George Madison Karicofe
- Company G, Mollohan's Company, Capt. William H. Mollohan
- Company I, Pocahontas Rescuers, Capt. Daniel A. Stofer
- Company K, Pendleton Minute Men, Capt. D.C. Anderson (company transferred from the 31st Virginia Infantry to the 25th)

== John B. Salling ==
The man who was recognized as Virginia's last surviving Confederate veteran, John B. Salling, claimed to work as a peter monkey and saltpeter miner after enlisting as a private in Company D, 25th Virginia Infantry, in Scott County, Virginia, during the Civil War.

== See also ==
- List of Virginia Civil War units
- List of West Virginia Civil War Confederate units
