= Beverley T. Crump =

American lawyer and politician

Beverly T. Crump
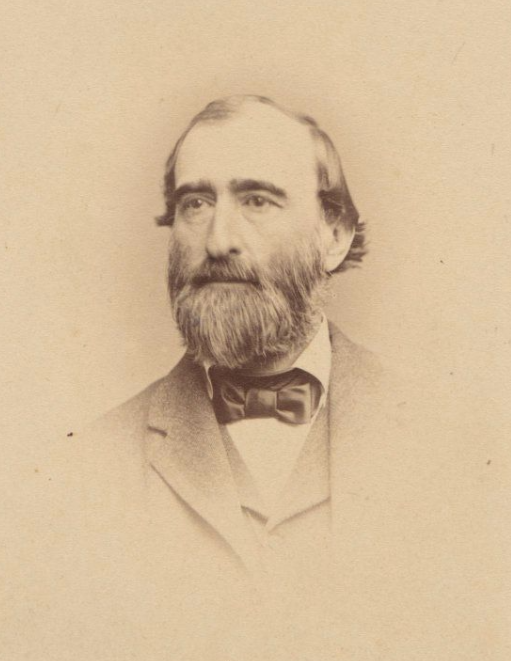

Member of the Virginia House of Delegates from the Richmond district
- In office 1893–1894

Member of the Virginia State Corporation Commission
- In office March 1, 1903 – 1907
- Preceded by: None (commission formed)
- Succeeded by: Robert R. Prentis

Personal details
- Born: June 10, 1854 Richmond, Virginia, U.S.
- Died: March 29, 1930 (aged 75) Richmond, Virginia, U.S.
- Party: Democratic
- Spouse: Etta Ogle Tayloe
- Children: 3 daughters, 1 son
- Education: Virginia Military Institute; University of Virginia Law School; University of Berlin; University of Gottingen
- Occupation: lawyer, politician, judge

Beverley Tucker Crump (June 10, 1854 – March 29, 1930) was a politician and judge in Virginia.

== Early and family life ==
His father, William Wood Crump, was a lawyer and judge who served as assistant secretary of the treasury for the Confederate States of America. His mother was Mary S. Tabb. His family included three sisters and two brothers. Although one sister and his brother William Wood Crump Jr. both died as children during the American Civil War, his brother Edward Tabb Crump and three sisters reached adulthood and married.

== Career ==
After completing law school and being admitted to the Virginia bar, Crump initially practiced law with his father. Richmond voters elected him to the Virginia House of Delegates (a part-time position) in 1893 and 1894. Legislators elected him as a circuit court judge in Richmond in 1902, but he never assumed office because he was also named as one of the three members of the new State Corporation Commission (alongside Henry Carter Stuart and Henry Fairfax, and assumed that office (also judicial) instead, serving through 1907.

He was president of the Virginia Boat Club in 1894, at the time of its incorporation.

== Personal life ==
Crump married Etta (Henrietta) Ogle Tayloe in 1884, who would survive him by nearly two decades. They had three daughters and a son, William Wood Crump (1887 – 1968).

== Death and legacy ==
He died in St. Petersburg, Florida in March 1930, but his remains were returned to Richmond for burial in historic Hollywood cemetery.
