= Robert D. Lilley (general) =

Robert Doak Lilley
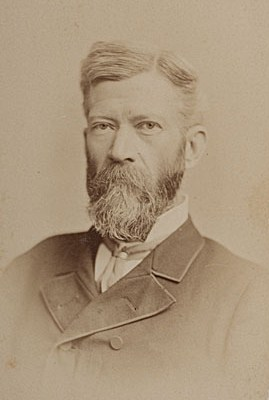
- Born: January 28, 1836; Greenville, Virginia
- Died: November 12, 1886 (aged 50); Richmond, Virginia
- Burial place: Thornrose Cemetery, Staunton, Virginia
- Military career
- Allegiance: Confederate States of America
- Branch: Confederate States Army
- Service years: 1861–65
- Rank: Brigadier General (CSA), temporary
- Commands: Lilley's Brigade, Valley District
- Conflicts: Jackson's Valley Campaign; Seven Days Battles; Battle of Cedar Mountain; Second Battle of Bull Run; Battle of Antietam; Battle of Fredericksburg; Battle of Chancellorsville; Battle of Gettysburg; Battle of Mine Run; Battle of the Wilderness; Battle of Spotsylvania Courthouse; Battle of North Anna; Battle of Cold Harbor; Battle of Monocacy
- Other work: financial agent at a college

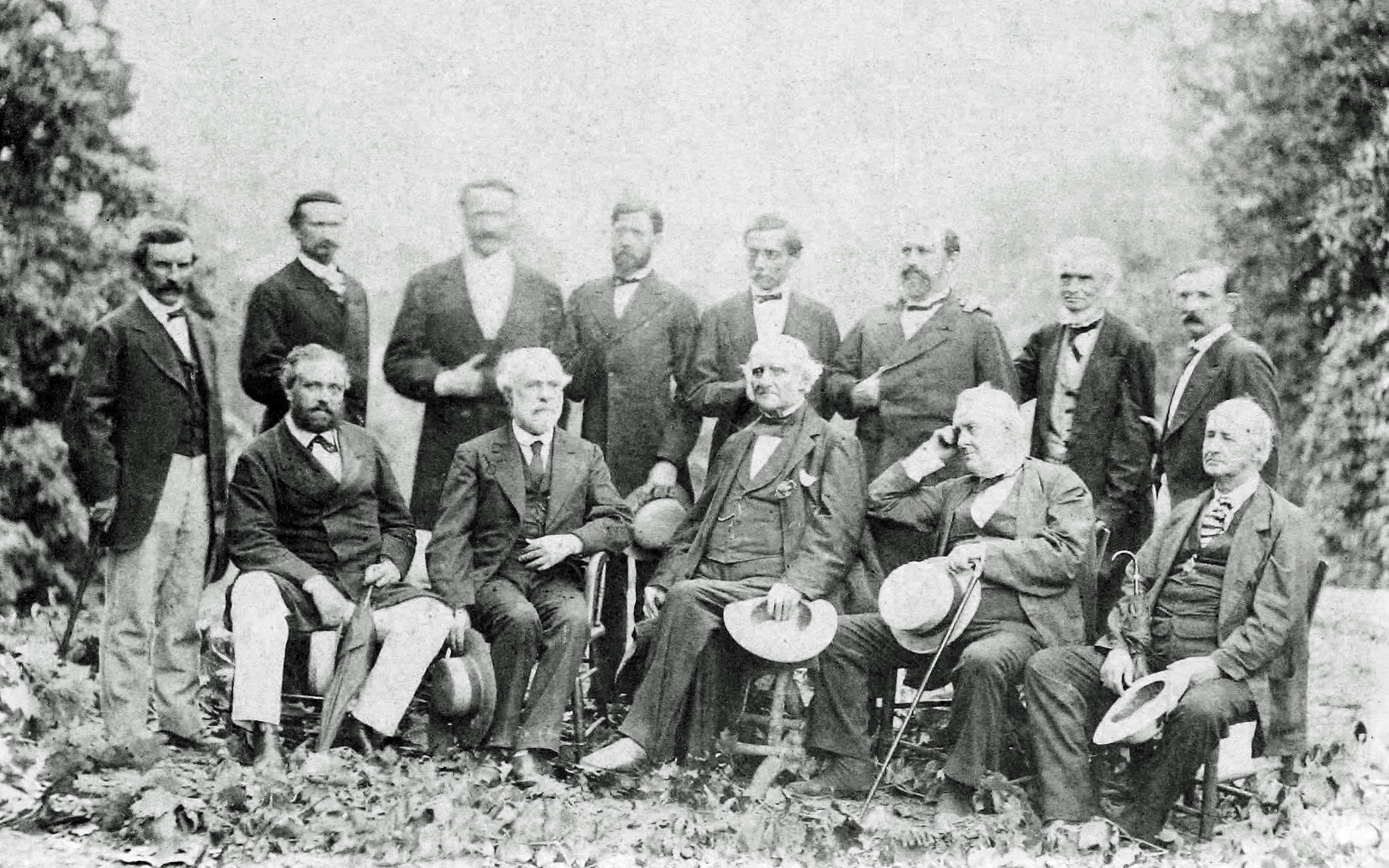
Lilley (top row, fourth from left) with Robert E. Lee and Confederate officers, 1869.

Robert Doak Lilley (January 28, 1836 – November 12, 1886) was a Confederate brigadier general during the American Civil War. He served in most of the leading battles of the Army of Northern Virginia and led a brigade of infantry in the Shenandoah Valley in the last years of the war.

== Early life and career ==
Robert D. Lilley was born near Greenville, Virginia to a military family. His father, James M. Lilley (1802–1875), a prominent landowner and patented inventor of surveying instruments, was commissioned in 1838 as a colonel in the Virginia militia.

Lilley studied at Washington College before beginning a career selling surveying instruments invented by his father.

== Civil War service ==
In 1861, he joined the Confederate army as a captain of the Lee Rifles, which became a company in the 25th Virginia Infantry.

The 25th Virginia joined the Army of Northern Virginia as part of Elzey's Brigade in the division of Richard S. Ewell and fought with Stonewall Jackson in the Shenandoah Valley. He received a commendation for his actions at the Battle of Cedar Mountain, and again at the Second Battle of Bull Run. After heavy losses throughout 1862, he was the senior officer in his regiment at the Battle of Antietam and commanded the unit.

In January, he was promoted to major, and after the Battle of Gettysburg he was cited again and promoted to lieutenant colonel. He was temporarily promoted to brigadier general on May 31, 1864 and given command of Pegram's old brigade of Virginia Regiments in Ramseur's Division of the Second Corps. He was left in command of the brigade when it was transferred to the Shenandoah Valley with Jubal A. Early to stop the Union advance there.

Lilley was wounded three times, lost an arm, and was captured at Stephenson's Depot on July 20, 1864. He was rescued four days later at Winchester and then rejoined his brigade. He surrendered in April 1865 and was paroled at Staunton, Virginia on May 23.

== Later life and career ==
In 1869 he became a financial agent at his alma mater, Washington College, renamed Washington and Lee College during his time there.

Robert D. Lilley died of paralysis in Richmond, Virginia on November 12, 1886, and is buried in Thornrose Cemetery in Staunton.

== See also ==
- List of American Civil War generals (Confederate)
