= William Wood Crump =

American lawyer and politician

William W. Crump
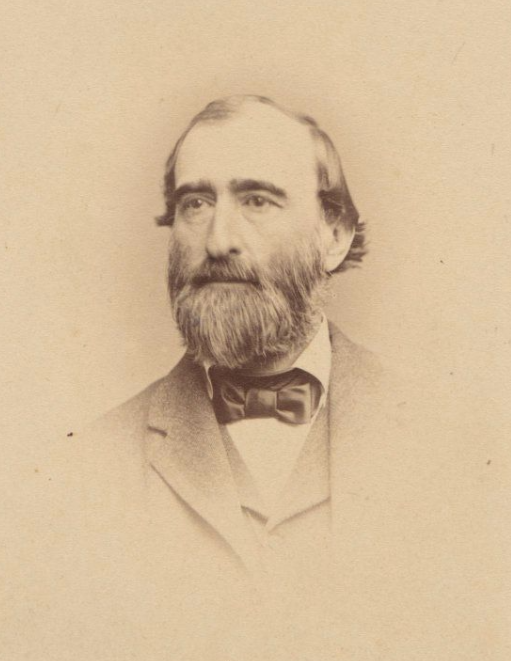
- Carte de visite portrait of Crump

Member of the Virginia House of Delegates from the Richmond district
- In office December 3, 1866 – October 4, 1867 Serving with T.J. Evans, N.M. Lee
- Preceded by: Peachy R. Grattan
- Succeeded by: William Lovenstein

Member of the Virginia House of Delegates from the Richmond district
- In office December 1, 1875 – December 5, 1876 Serving with James H. Dooley, Charles U. Williams, William S. Gilman, W.P.M. Kellam
- Preceded by: Joseph R. Anderson
- Succeeded by: William Lovenstein

Personal details
- Born: November 25, 1819 Henrico County, Virginia, U.S.
- Died: February 27, 1897 (aged 77) Richmond, Virginia, U.S.
- Party: Democratic
- Spouse: Mary Tabb
- Children: Emmaline Allmand Crump Lightfoot, Fanny Crump Tucker, Edward Tabb Crump, Beverley Tucker Crump
- Education: College of William and Mary
- Occupation: lawyer, politician, judge

Military service
- Allegiance: Confederate States of America

William Wood Crump (November 25, 1819 – February 27, 1897) was an American lawyer and politician from Virginia. He briefly served as a judge, later became assistant Secretary of the Treasury for the Confederate States of America and twice briefly represented the City of Richmond in the Virginia House of Delegates as well as served at times on Richmond's City Council.

== Early and family life ==
Born to Richmond merchant Sterling Jamieson Crump (1782-1847) and his wife Elizabeth Richardson Wood (1792-1855) in Henrico County on November 25, 1819, Crump received a private education in his home town from Dr. Gwathmey, then was sent to the Amherst Institute (later Amherst College) in Amherst, Massachusetts. He had a younger brother John R. Crump (1830-1874?) and several sisters. They were descended from the First Families of Virginia, ancestor William Crump having emigrated from England to York County, Virginia and many intervening generations having lived and operated plantations in New Kent County, Virginia after it was split from York County. Crump entered the College of William and Mary in 1835 and graduated three years later, having studied law under Professor N. Beverley Tucker.

He married Mary Susan Tabb (1824-1891), daughter of Philip E. Tabb (1786-1851) of Gloucester County, Virginia on New Year's Day, 1846 and they remained married 45 years until her death. Four children survived him: Emmaline Allmand Crump Lightfoot (1847-1937), Fanny Crump Tucker (1849-1937), Edward Tabb Crump (1851-1919) and Beverley Tucker Crump (1854-1930). Several others died as children, including Mary Tabb Crump (1856-1861) and William Wood (1858-1862) and Randolph Tabb Crump, who died in wartime Richmond. His son B. T. Crump also became his law partner, as well as represented Richmond in the Virginia House of Delegates for one term (1893-1894).

== Career ==
After graduating from the College of William & Mary, Crump was admitted to the Virginia bar in 1840. A Democrat, he often delivered speeches on the subject of "States Rights" and supported John C. Calhoun for president in 1844, as well as the annexation of Texas. He later supported James Polk and Lewis Cass. The Virginia General Assembly in 1851 elected Crump Judge of the Circuit Court of Richmond to succeed John S. Caskie, who had resigned. However, the new Virginia Constitution of 1851 changed the judicial system to permit popular election of judges the following year, and his position was terminated. Although Crump only served a short time, he was thereafter referred to as "Judge Crump". Crump also served many years on the board of trustees of his alma mater, beginning in 1853, and eventually became President of its Board of Visitors.

In the 1850 U.S. Federal census for Henrico County, Crump owned 13 slaves: five children, 6 adult men and two women. In the 1860 Federal census for Henrico County, Crump's name appears on several different pages, suggesting that he hired out his slaves.

During and after the American Civil War, Crump supported slavery and the Confederate States of America. He served as a civilian Judge Advocate, and became assistant Secretary of the Treasury and administered day-to-day functions of the Treasury, During the evacuation of Richmond, Crump was responsible or taking a small amount of money into Washington, some of which he later provided to Mrs. Varina Davis when fleeing Union patrols. President Andrew Johnson granted him amnesty on June 26, 1865.

After the war, upon the resignation of fellow lawyer Peachy R. Grattan as one of the City's representatives (part-time) in the Virginia House of Delegates, Crump succeeded to the position. He was not, however, re-elected, but resumed his law practice full-time. He also was elected in 1875, but like Grattan years earlier, only served one of the sessions. Crump was among 20 prominent men who posted the bond for former Confederate President Jefferson Davis in 1867 after he was indicted for treason. He also was among the prominent speakers on April 29, 1870 at the memorial following the disastrous balcony collapse at the Virginia Supreme Court, and the following year helped gather funds for survivors of the Great Chicago Fire. Crump also participated in several sensational trials: defending former Confederate soldier Jeter Phillips who was accused of murdering his wife in Hanover, Thomas Judson Cluverius for the murder of his cousin in Richmond, and litigation concerning John Randolph's will.

== Final years, death and legacy ==
Judge Crump died in Richmond on February 27, 1897, nearly six years after his wife.
