= George W. Hansbrough =

Virginia farmer and court reporter

George Woodson Hansbrough
- Born: August 16, 1828; Culpeper County, Virginia, U.S.
- Died: July 26, 1896 (aged 67); Salem, Virginia, U.S.
- Burial place: East Hill Cemetery Salem, Virginia
- Education: University of Virginia
- Spouse: Virginia Chancellor
- Children: T.C. Hansbrough
- Military career
- Allegiance: Confederate States of America
- Branch: Confederate States Army
- Service years: 1861–1865
- Rank: Lt.Col.
- Unit: 9th Battalion
- Conflicts: Battle of Camp Allegheny

George Woodson Hansbrough (September 14, 1828 – July 26, 1896) was a Virginia farmer, lawyer and soldier who during his final decade reported opinions issued by the Virginia Supreme Court. During the American Civil War, Hansbrough recruited a company of Confederate States Army volunteers from Taylor County in what became West Virginia during that conflict, and later recruited another company from near Roanoke, Virginia.

== Early life and education ==
Born on September 14, 1828, in Culpeper County, Virginia, to Alexander Hamilton Hansbrough and his new wife Elizabeth Clayton Strother, Hansbrough lost his father when he was 18. His brother John Strother Hansbrough became the longest serving rector of St. Thomas Episcopal Church in Orange, Virginia. He also had four younger sisters, of whom Roberta Banks Hansbrough survived until 1906. Meanwhile, George Hansbrough received a private education and also graduated from the University of Virginia in 1855.

In the 1840 U.S. Federal census, the Alexander Hansborough family owned six slaves and also employed a free black woman. In the 1850 census, his mother owned 16 slaves inherited from her uncle John Strother, all but two of them adults. George Hansbrough (or Hansborough) owned at least one enslaved person in Taylor County in 1860.

On November 8, 1851, in Rappahannock, Virginia, George Hansbrough married Mary Virginia ("Jennie") Chancellor, and they had three daughters—Marion Wallace Hansbrough (1854–1891), Lila Ashby Hansbrough (1858–1890), and Maria A. Hansbrough (1858–1890)—and a son, Livingston Chancellor Hansbrough (1856–1916).

== Career ==
After graduating from the University of Virginia with a law degree, Hansbrough moved to Pruntytown, West Virginia, at the intersection of the Washington Post Road and the Fairmont-Booths Ferry Pike. He taught school and began his legal practice at the county seat of Taylor County (established 1849). Admitted to the Virginia Bar, he was elected the Commonwealth Attorney (local prosecutor).

As Virginia seceded from the Union, Governor John Letcher and General Robert E. Lee sent Col. George A. Porterfield of neighboring Jefferson County to Grafton, West Virginia, a relatively new Baltimore and Ohio Railroad town about three miles from Pruntytown. He was met with more hostility than he expected, for many in Taylor County favored Union, and after the Wheeling Convention, longtime Pruntytown resident Harmon Sinsel became their delegate and helped establish the new state (and its name "West Virginia" rather than "Kanawha"). Porterfield eventually recruited companies which became the 25th Virginia Infantry, and county attorney Hansbrough recruited and became captain of what became the 9th Battalion. Hansbrough officially enlisted on June 3, 1861, and by the end of the month was promoted to Lt. Colonel, remaining at that rank throughout the war. Meanwhile, George R. Latham organized the Grafton Guards from the same area; that became part of the Unionist 2nd West Virginia Infantry and 5th West Virginia Volunteer Cavalry.

Lt. Col. Hansbrough was severely wounded and carried from the field leading his men during the Battle of Camp Allegheny in December 1861, as they defended what became their winter quarters overlooking the turnpike between Staunton and Parkersburg. In the spring of 1862, his decimated unit merged into the similarly undermanned 25th Virginia Infantry, only to be officially separated on November 4, 1862 (after a prisoner exchange on August 16, 1862). Lt. Col. Hansbrough also served as an aide de camp to General William Taliaferro. However, by August 1862, because of his wounds and the dispersing of his battalion, he applied for a clerkship in the Confederate Treasury department under W.W. Crump, as well as requested permission to raise troops behind enemy lines after other West Virginians voted to secede from the Commonwealth of Virginia. He became Lt. Col. of Hansbrough's Roanoke Battalion, which consisted of conscripts and reserves, and was placed into service by October 6, 1864.

After the war, Hansbrough moved with his wife and mother to Botetourt County, Virginia, and later to Bonsack, Virginia, and eventually, Roanoke County, Virginia. Hansborough's family lived and farmed for two decades about three miles from the town of Salem, Virginia, where his mother died in 1871. Hansbrough led a committee petitioning former Confederate General turned U.S. Senator William Mahone to bring a railroad line through Salem, but nearby Big Lick was selected instead for the major junction, becoming Roanoke. After his son L.C. Hansborough stopped teaching and left his post as Commonwealth's Attorney (1883–1891) to join his father's practice, Hansborough moved into the then town of Salem in 1891. He was also active in the Republican Party and in St. Paul's Episcopal Church.

After the deaths of longtime Virginia law reporter Peachy R. Grattan in 1881 and Chief Justice R. C. L. Moncure in 1882, the Readjuster Party took control of the Virginia General Assembly. The new justices of the Virginia Supreme Court appointed Hansbrough as their reporter. During his twelve year term (not renewed due to changing legislative politics), Hansbrough gathered and published what were later enumerated as volumes 76 through 90 of the Virginia Reports.
