= Littleton Waller Tazewell =

American politician (1774–1860)

Littleton Tazewell
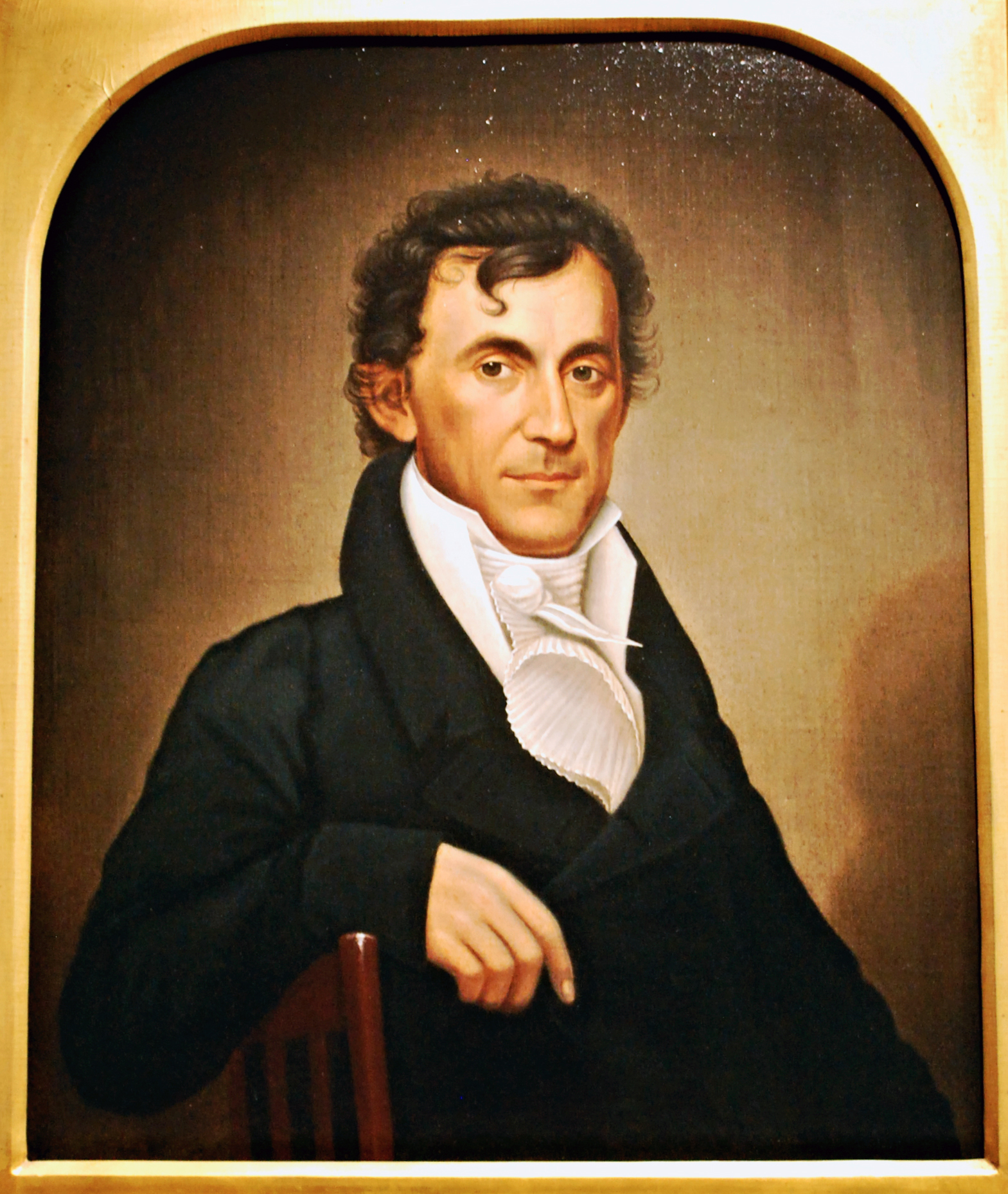

26th Governor of Virginia
- In office March 31, 1834 – April 30, 1836
- Preceded by: John Floyd
- Succeeded by: Wyndham Robertson (acting)

President pro tempore of the United States Senate
- In office July 9, 1832 – July 16, 1832
- Preceded by: Samuel Smith
- Succeeded by: Hugh Lawson White

United States Senator from Virginia
- In office December 7, 1824 – July 16, 1832
- Preceded by: John Taylor
- Succeeded by: William Rives

Member of the Virginia House of Delegates
- In office 1816–1817 Serving with William Barrett, Archer Hankins
- Preceded by: Miles King
- Succeeded by: George Loyall
- In office 1809–1812
- Preceded by: William Lightfoot
- Succeeded by: William Barrett
- In office 1798–1800 Serving with John Allen, William Lightfoot
- Preceded by: John Pierce
- Succeeded by: Champion Travis

Member of the U.S. House of Representatives from Virginia's 13th district
- In office November 26, 1800 – March 3, 1801
- Preceded by: John Marshall
- Succeeded by: John Clopton

Personal details
- Born: December 17, 1774 Williamsburg, Virginia, British America
- Died: May 6, 1860 (aged 85) Norfolk, Virginia, U.S.
- Party: Anti-Administration (Before 1792); Democratic-Republican (1792–1825); Jacksonian (1825–1828); Democratic (1828–1860)
- Spouse: Anne Stratton
- Children: 8
- Education: College of William & Mary (BA)

Littleton Waller Tazewell (December 17, 1774 – May 6, 1860) was a Virginia lawyer, plantation owner, and politician who served as a U.S. representative, U.S. senator and the 26th governor of Virginia, as well as a member of the Virginia House of Delegates.

== Early life and education ==
Tazewell, son of Henry Tazewell and his wife Dorothy Elizabeth Waller, was born in Williamsburg in the Colony of Virginia shortly before Christmas, 1774. His father was a clerk of the revolutionary conventions during the next two years. Although his mother died when he was a child, his maternal grandfather, prominent lawyer and judge Benjamin Waller, taught him Latin. Tazewell was privately tutored by John Wickham; he later graduated from the College of William & Mary at Williamsburg in 1791.

== Personal life ==
He married Ann Stratton Nivison. The couple had at least six daughters and two sons, although only four daughters would survive their mother.

== Career ==
After studying law, Tazewell was admitted to the Virginia bar in 1796 and commenced practice in James City County, Virginia. He was a member of the Virginia House of Delegates (a part-time position) representing James City County from 1798 to 1800, when he resigned to fill the vacancy caused by the resignation of John Marshall in the Sixth United States Congress, serving in the federal legislature from November 26, 1800, to March 4, 1801. Politically, Tazewell was a Jeffersonian Republican, and upon the fissure of that party he associated with the Jacksonian Democrats.

Tazewell moved to Norfolk, Virginia in 1802. He represented Norfolk Borough in the General Assemblies of 1804–1805 and 1805–1806 but was replaced by William Newsum, Jr. in the Assembly of 1806–1806. Nonetheless, on July 5, 1807, he defused the impressment crisis involving the British HMS Leopard in Norfolk harbor and the USS Chesapeake and Norfolk mayor Richard E. Lee. Tazewell again represented James City County in the House of Delegates from 1809 until 1812. Norfolk voters elected him to represent the Borough again in the Virginia House of Delegates from 1816 to 1817. After the War of 1812, Tazewell, General Taylor, George Newton, and others also formed the Roanoke Commercial Company, designed to expand traffic through the Dismal Swamp Canal and allow goods from as far away as mountainous Bedford County to ship through Norfolk. Tazewell also served as one of the commissioners of claims under the treaty with Spain, which ceded Florida in 1821.

Virginia legislators elected Tazewell in 1824 to the United States Senate to fill the vacancy caused by the death of John Taylor. Re-elected in 1829, he served from December 7, 1824, to July 16, 1832, when he resigned to become Virginia's governor, as discussed below. While in the Senate, Tazewell was President pro tempore of the Senate during the Twenty-second United States Congress and chairman of the Senate Committee on Foreign Relations. His principal published work is Review of the Negotiations between the United States and Great Britain Respecting the Commerce of the Two Countries (1829).

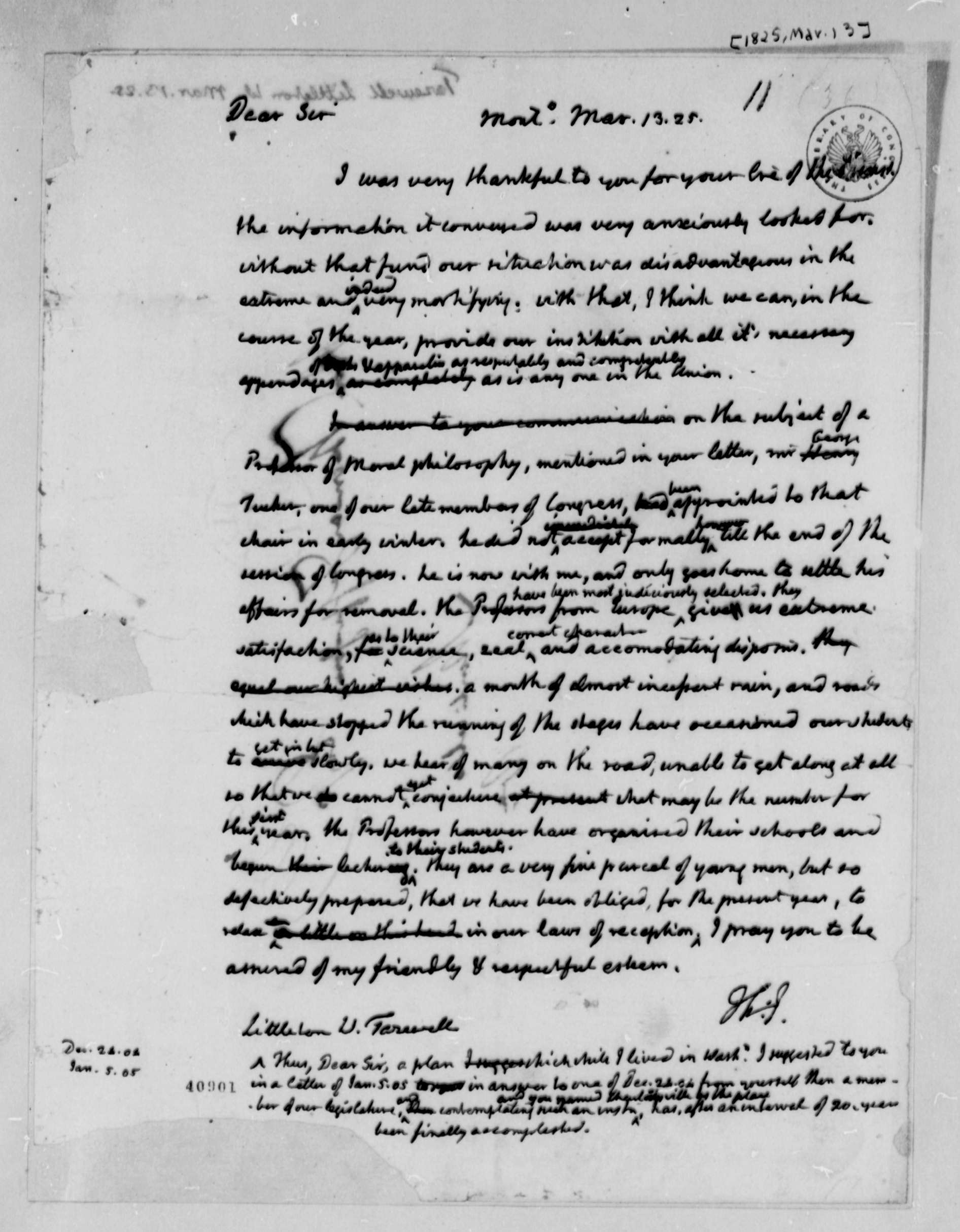
Letter from Thomas Jefferson to Littleton Waller Tazewell, 1825. Library of Congress

Tazewell served as Norfolk's delegate to the Virginia Constitutional Convention in 1829–1830.

When the Whigs secured majorities in the Virginia Assembly for six years, they first elected the Old Republican as a Whig governor 1834–36. However, he resigned a year before his term ended. During his two years as governor, Tazewell had to address abolitionism. However, Nat Turner's revolt had occurred in 1831 while Tazewell was home from Washington (and caused him to neglect his plantations). He became an advocate of wholesale colonization and, as Governor, asked Virginia's legislature to formally request that Northern states suppress abolitionist groups and also asked Congress to suppress delivery of such literature through the U.S. Post Office. Tazewell's governorship was also marked by an expansion of the James River Canal, which was to connect to the Kanawha Canal and thus the Ohio River. Under his leadership, the Assembly instructed Virginia's U.S. Senators to support internal improvements, protective tariffs, and a national bank supporting Henry Clay's American System.

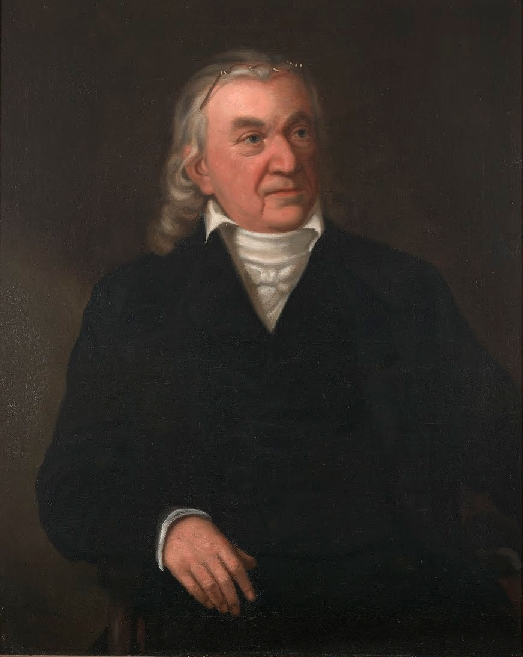
Portrait of Tazewell by George Peter Alexander Healy

Following his term as governor, Tazewell retired from public life but received 11 electoral votes for vice-president in the election of 1840.

Tazewell owned plantations and enslaved persons in the Hampton Roads area. In the 1830 U.S. Federal Census, his Norfolk household included nine free white people (5 his children) and a dozen enslaved people. Although Virginia state slave censuses are not available online, and several federal census returns appear either missing or digitally misindexed, by 1860, his household included nine enslaved people (3 men, 5 women, and one 2-year-old boy) in Norfolk, and over 100 enslaved people across the Chesapeake Bay in Northampton County, Virginia (inherited through his wife).

== Death and legacy ==
Governor Tazewell died a widower in Norfolk, Virginia, on May 6, 1860. Initially interred with his wife on his estate on the Eastern Shore of Virginia, he was re-interred in 1866 at Elmwood Cemetery in Norfolk.

Tazewell, Virginia, Tazewell County, Virginia and Tazewell County, Illinois are named in his honor and his father's honor, as are the cities of Tazewell and New Tazewell, Tennessee. A plaque remembering him stands at the corner of Tazewell and Granby streets in Norfolk, near the Tazewell Hotel and Suites, where his two-story house was located. His house, known as the Boush-Tazewell House, was completely dismantled and re-erected in its present location about three miles from its original site around 1902. It was listed on the National Register of Historic Places in 1974.

Tazewell was the maternal grandfather of Littleton Waller Tazewell Bradford, a prominent Virginia politician and a founder of Pi Kappa Alpha fraternity.

A building at the College of William and Mary is named in Tazewell's honor.

U.S. House of Representatives
Preceded by John Marshall	Member of the U.S. House of Representatives from Virginia's 13th congressional district 1800–1801	Succeeded by John Clopton
U.S. Senate
Preceded by John Taylor	U.S. Senator (Class 2) from Virginia; 1824–1832; Served alongside: James Barbour, John Randolph, John Tyler	Succeeded by William Rives
Preceded by Nathaniel Macon	Chair of the Senate Foreign Relations Committee; 1828–1832	Succeeded by John Forsyth
Political offices
Preceded by Samuel Smith	President pro tempore of the United States Senate; 1832	Succeeded by Hugh Lawson White
Preceded by John Floyd	Governor of Virginia; 1834–1836	Succeeded by Wyndham Robertson; Acting
Party political offices
Preceded by Richard Johnson	Democratic nominee for Vice President of the United States^{(1)} 1840	Succeeded by George M. Dallas
Honorary titles
Preceded by Benjamin Tappan	Oldest living U.S. senator 1857–1860	Succeeded by William Wilkins
Notes and references
1. There was no formal Democratic nominee. The Electoral College gave most votes to incumbent Vice President Richard Johnson, and others voted for Tazewell and James K. Polk.
