= Don Wemple =

American football player (1917–1943)

Profile
- Position: End

Personal information
- Born: October 14, 1917; Gloversville, New York, U.S.
- Died: June 23, 1943 (aged 25); The Hump, British India

Career information
- College: Colgate

Career history
- 1941: Brooklyn Dodgers

Don Wemple (October 14, 1917 – June 23, 1943) was an American football player. He played one season in the National Football League for the Brooklyn Dodgers.

After playing college football at Colgate (where he was a team captain in 1937) and in the 1939 Chicago College All-Star Game (despite missing much of the game with a leg injury, Wemple elected not to pursue a professional career as he hoped to either become a coach or a businessman. Although he changed his mind in 1941 and signed with the Dodgers, he also enlisted in the United States Army Air Forces during the season. In November, he caught the game-winning touchdown against the Washington Redskins.

With World War II ongoing, the Army Air Forces summoned Wemple to active duty on January 13, 1942, and he received flight training in Georgia and Florida. In September, he joined Robert Neyland's Eastern All-Army team that played NFL teams in exhibition games to raise money for the Army's relief fund, but never played due to other service obligations.

Serving in the Pacific War, he died on June 23, 1943, when his plane was shot down on the Hump air route in India. In October, prior to their game against the New York Giants, the Dodgers unveiled a banner with 40 blue stars indicating their players in the military with Wemple's being the only gold star. He was married to Doris Johnson who later married Don Harrell and died in New Smyrna Beach, FL in 2002.
