= George Chahoon =

American politician

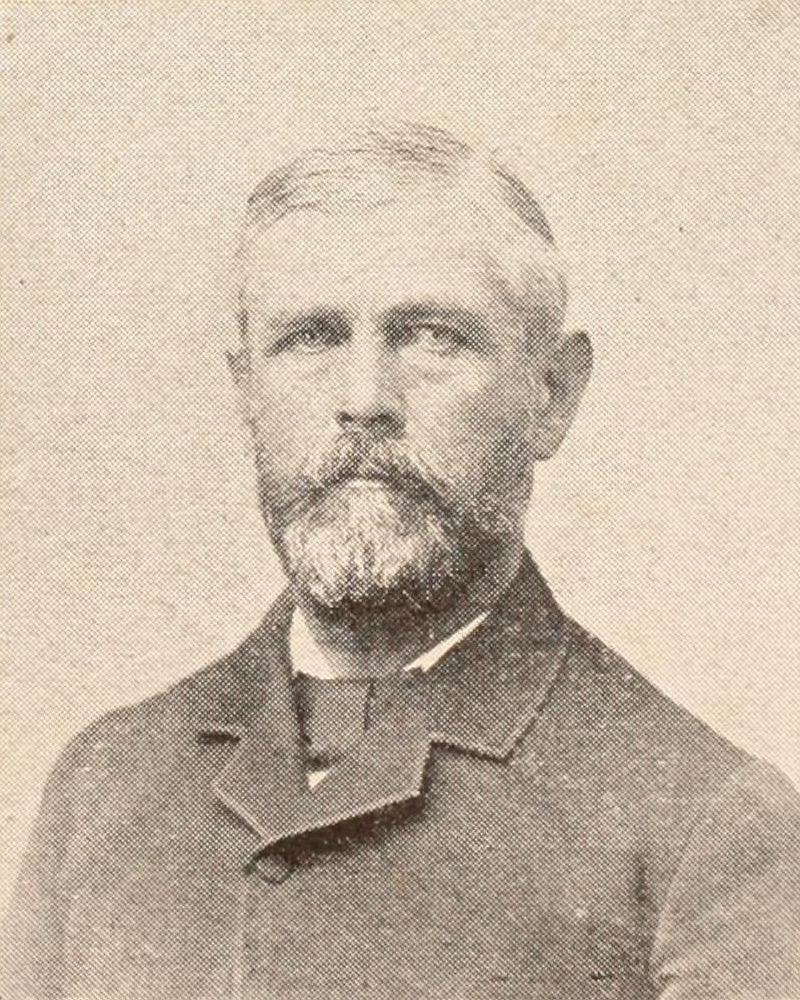
- Portrait of Chahoon, c. 1897

Member of the New York State Senate from the 31st district
- In office January 1, 1896 – December 31, 1900
- Preceded by: Henry H. Persons
- Succeeded by: Spencer G. Prime

Mayor of Richmond, Virginia
- In office May 6, 1868 – June 30, 1871
- Preceded by: Joseph C. Mayo
- Succeeded by: Henry K. Ellyson (disputed); Anthony M. Keiley

Personal details
- Born: George Chahoon; February 2, 1840 Sherburne, New York, US
- Died: July 29, 1934 (aged 94) Au Sable Forks, New York, US
- Resting place: Fairview Cemetery; Black Brook, New York
- Party: Republican

George Chamberlin Chahoon (February 2, 1840 – July 29, 1934) was an American politician from Virginia and New York. He was Mayor of Richmond, Virginia, from 1868 to 1870, and a Republican member of the New York State Senate from 1896 to 1900.

== Early and family life ==
Chahoon was born in Sherburne, New York, to building contractor John Chahoon and his wife, the former Temperance Jameson. His family moved to Virginia not long after he was born. He grew up in Botetourt County and received a private education, and may have begun reading law. By 1863, Chahoon worked in Washington, D.C., as a clerk in the Treasury Department.

On September 24, 1867, Chahoon married Mary Jane Rogers of Au Sable Forks, Clinton Co. (Township of Black Brook), New York, about 25 miles south of Plattsburgh, New York. The lived in Au Sable Forks, Clinon Co., New York, along North Main Street. They had two sons, George Jr, and Issac "Jonah" and one daughter Mary (Jr) before her death on November 27, 1887. Chahoon remarried, but his second wife Christiana Van Allen died on August 1, 1903.

== Virginia career ==
By 1864, Chahoon was in Norfolk and practicing law. He moved to Elizabeth City County and won election as commonwealth's attorney in 1865. He became leader of Williamsburg's Republican party after the Civil War. In late 1866, during Congressional Reconstruction Chahoon moved to the state capitol, Richmond, and U.S. District Judge John C. Underwood appointed him a federal commissioner. In July, Chahoon won the local Republican party's nomination as city attorney, although Virginia law at the time forbad any federal official from holding a municipal office.

Nonetheless, John M. Schofield, Virginia's military commander, deposed long-time city attorney turned mayor Joseph C. Mayo (whom voters had re-elected despite his being removed in July 1865), and on May 6, 1868, appointed Chahoon mayor of Richmond. After he took office, Chahoon began purging city government of former Confederates. In another controversial move, he fired ten white police officers and created a special 25-man black police force, with former Confederate NCO Benjamin Scott (a black man) as their chief. Mayor Chahoon also required tavernkeepers to post their licenses, hired lamplighters to do that duty (formerly performed by policemen) and sought a stiffer dog ordinance—all of which proved controversial.

== Richmond's Municipal War ==
After Schofield's departure to become U.S. Secretary of War under President Andrew Johnson, and Reconstruction ended in Virginia after voters approved a new state constitution (but not certain anti-Confederate provisions), the new Virginia General Assembly passed a law allowing the newly elected governor, Gilbert C. Walker, to appoint members of the Richmond city council. He only reappointed three Republicans, and the new Conservative-dominated Council chose publisher Henry K. Ellyson to become the city's mayor on March 16, 1870. Chahoon and some of his Republican allies, including the police commissioner Poe, refused to leave office. For about two months, Richmond had two mayors and two police forces. Ellyson's supporters besieged Chahoon and his allies, who had barricaded themselves in the main police station, until they were rescued by federal troops sent by General Edward Canby, only to take over another police station. In separate skirmishes, one black Republican and one German Catholic deputy (both never named in published accounts) were killed. Governor Walker formally contested the federal action. Chahoon and Ellyson also wanted courts to decide which was the legitimate administration. The federal judges (Underwood and the applicable circuit justice, Salmon P. Chase) deferred to the Virginia Supreme Court of Appeals.

That court announced that it would render its opinion on April 27, 1870, in its upstairs courtroom within the Virginia State Capitol. The overcrowded gallery collapsed just before the judges entered, which caused the courtroom floor to collapse into the chamber of the House of Delegates below. Amidst the dust and chaos, initial estimates were that about 75 men had died and 500 more injured, among them Chahoon and Ellyson. The appeals court ultimately ruled in Ellyson's favor two days later, but also set a new election for May. Then the men carrying the ballots from pro-Chahoon Jackson Ward were robbed of those completed ballots, and the Conservative-dominated Board of Elections declared Ellyson the winner based on the other wards' countable ballots. However, Ellyson refused to continue in the circumstances, necessitating yet another election, which Chahoon lost to New-Jersey born former Confederate and publisher Anthony M. Kieley.

Conservatives then sent Chahoon to prison on a forgery charge relating to real estate, after he was convicted by three juries (two verdicts having been overturned on appeal, and the third jury recommended clemency). Governor Walker, a fellow native New Yorker, pardoned Chahoon on December 16, 1871, reputedly on the condition that he leave the Commonwealth.

== New York career and politics ==
Chahoon returned to upstate New York and eventually assume control of J & J Rogers Company, which his wife's father had founded and which prospered under Chahoon, who became its vice-president and later president. He lived in Albany, Glen Falls and Au Sable, and was active in the Masons as well as the state and national Republican parties. Chahoon also appreciated the area's nature, and published articles in Popular Science Magazine about the effects on the water supply of forest fires in 1878, and about birds of the Adirondack Mountains in 1900.

Voters in the 31st district (consisting of Clinton, Essex and Warren Counties) elected Chahoon to the New York State Senate twice. He served from 1896 to 1900 (a three-year and a two-year term), including on committees relating to Agriculture, Forests, fish and game, Railroads, and Trades and Manufactures. Thus he sat in the 119th, 120th, 121st, 122nd and 123rd New York State Legislatures. Chahoon also attended national Republican political conventions. He retired from electoral politics in 1900 but remained politically active until his death.

== Death and legacy ==
Chahoon survived both his wives and died in Au Sable Forks, Essex co., New York, on July 29, 1934. His son George Chahoon Jr. (1872-1951) moved to Quebec and became one of Canada's leading pulp manufacturers.

The Library of Virginia received some of mayor Chahoon's papers in 2013. Records of the J&J Rogers Company, which started as an iron mining company and developed the Au Sable River valley, but which by 1888 under Chahoon's leadership had become a lumber and pulp company until it closed circa 1970, are held by the Plattsburgh State University library's special collections.

New York State Senate
Preceded by Henry H. Persons	New York State Senate; 31st District; 1896–1900	Succeeded by Spencer G. Prime
