= William W. Wemple =

American politician

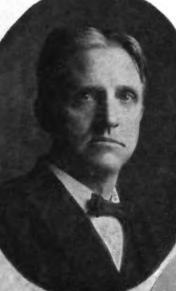
William W. Wemple (1903)

William Wallace Wemple (January 19, 1862, in Duanesburg, Schenectady County, New York – February 11, 1933, in Schenectady, New York) was an American lawyer and politician from New York.

== Life ==
He was the son of James Vanderpool Wemple (1820–1900) and Margaret Ann (Kaley) Wemple (1835–1918). He attended the district schools, Union Classical Institute, and Union College. Then he taught school, and was Principal of the Scotia village school. Then he studied law, graduated from Albany Law School in 1886, was admitted to the bar the same year, and practiced. In 1894, he married M. Adelaide Quaife, and they had five children, among them Assemblyman William W. Wemple, Jr. (1898–1972).

Wemple was District Attorney of Schenectady County from 1896 to 1901; a member of the New York State Assembly (Schenectady Co.) in 1903, 1904, 1905 and 1906; and a member of the New York State Senate (31st D.) in 1907 and 1908.

== Sources ==
- Official New York from Cleveland to Hughes by Charles Elliott Fitch (Hurd Publishing Co., New York and Buffalo, 1911, Vol. IV; pg. 347, 349, 351f and 366)
- The New York Red Book by Edgar L. Murlin (1903; pg. 187f)
- Wemple genealogy
- W.W. WEMPLE DEAD; EX-STATE SENATOR in NYT on February 12, 1933 (subscription required)

New York State Assembly
Preceded by Andrew J. McMillan	New York State Assembly; Schenectady County; 1903–1906	Succeeded by Miles R. Frisbie
New York State Senate
Preceded by Spencer G. Prime	New York State Senate; 31st District; 1907–1908	Succeeded by William A. Gardner
