= William W. Wemple Jr. =

American lawyer and politician

- Born: March 5, 1898
- Died: October 14, 1972 (aged 74); Schenectady, New York, U.S.
- Education: Union College; Albany Law School
- Occupations: Lawyer, politician

William W. Wemple Jr. (March 5, 1898 - October 14, 1972) was an American lawyer and politician. He served as a member of the New York State Assembly from 1930 to 1931.

New York State Assembly
Preceded by William M. Nicoll	New York State Assembly; Schenectady County, 2nd District; 1930–1931	Succeeded by John H. Buhmaster
