= Joseph Mayo =

American politician

Joseph Carrington Mayo
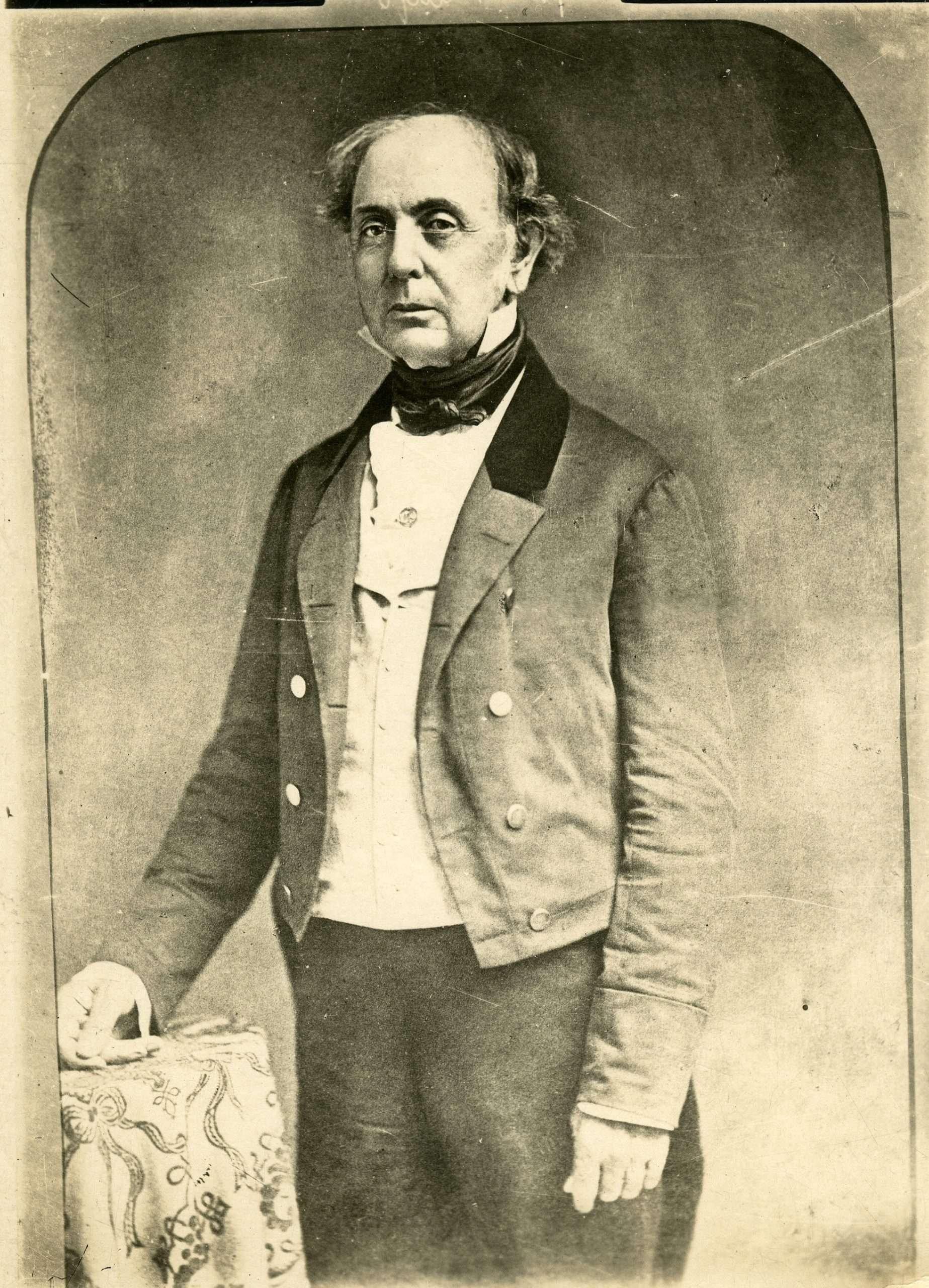

Member of the Virginia House of Delegates from the Richmond district
- In office December 7, 1846 – December 1, 1850
- Preceded by: James Lyons
- Succeeded by: Thomas P. August

43rd Mayor of Richmond, Virginia
- In office 1853 – July 1, 1865
- Preceded by: Samuel T. Pulliam
- Succeeded by: David J. Saunders

45th Mayor of Richmond, Virginia
- In office April 6, 1866 – May 7, 1866
- Preceded by: David J. Saunders
- Succeeded by: George Chahoon

Personal details
- Born: November 16, 1795 Henrico County, Virginia, U.S.
- Died: August 8, 1872 (aged 76) Richmond, Virginia
- Spouse: Mariana Tabb
- Occupation: lawyer, businessman, politician

Military service
- Allegiance: Virginia; Confederate States
- Branch/service: Virginia Militia

Joseph Carrington Mayo (November 16, 1795 – August 8, 1872) was a Virginia lawyer and politician. He served in the Virginia House of Delegates, as attorney for the City of Richmond and as the city's mayor (and chief magistrate) from 1852 through the American Civil War. Mayo surrendered the city to the Union Army on April 3, 1865, and was twice deposed by Union generals during the military occupation and Congressional Reconstruction.

== Early and family life ==
Joseph Mayo was born on November 16, 1795, at Powhatan Seat, a plantation in Henrico County, Virginia, about two miles east of what would become downtown Richmond. His background was intertwined with the city and with slavery.

The Mayo family intermarried with established First Families of Virginia - including Poythress, Tabb, Bland, Randolph, Bennett. Joseph C Mayo's father was Joseph Mayo (1771-1820) and his mother was Jane Poythress (1773-1837). His grandfather was Joseph Mayo (1739- c.1802) m Martha Tabb (1744-1792). His great-grandfather was emigrant William Mayo (1684-1744), the surveyor who struck the dividing line between Virginia and North Carolina and who was featured in Wm Byrd's manuscript on that expedition. William Mayo also laid out the city of Richmond before his death in 1744. Joe Mayo had an elder brother Philip Mayo (1793-1857) and younger brothers Peter Poythress Mayo (1797-1857), Judge Robert Mayo (1807- _) of Westmoreland County, Virginia, and John Bland Mayo (1812-1868), as well as sisters Agnes (b. 1831), Elizabeth Mayo (b. 1804-1864), Lucy Ann Mayo and Martha Tabb Mayo.

His paternal great grandfather, the aforementioned William Mayo, helped found the town of Richmond, working with [William Byrd] (who owned the land and built his own stately mansion). During Henrico County's first personal property census, in 1783 (two years before the birth of the future Mayor Mayo), his grandfather Joseph Mayo owned 37 enslaved persons, compared to the county's largest slaveowner, Peter Randolph (who owned 74 enslaved persons) and about a dozen other wealthy individuals (including the estate of lawyer Robert Carter Nicholas which owned 41 slaves). His son John Mayo (1769-1818) (this Mayor Joseph Mayo's uncle) built the first bridge across the James River to Manchester (annexed to the City of Richmond, long after Mayor Mayo's demise).

Another Joseph Mayo Esq (1756-1785), a close family member whose parentage has not yet been established, but who was likely descended from William Mayo's (Surveyor) brother Joseph (who emigrated with William from Barbados to Virginia) wrote a will in 1780 in which he attempted to free his slaves (as was illegal at the time, so he asked his executors to seek special legislation after his death to free them), and as an alternative asked his executors to divide them among named relatives. Litigation ensued after his death, which went before the Virginia Supreme Court. In November 1791 (two years before young Joe Mayo was born), the judges decided that Mayo's slaves were freed by special legislation and divided the rest of the property among the named heirs (his descendants as well as those of his brother and Paul Carrington).

On March 16, 1819, this Joseph C. Mayo married Marianna Tabb in Mathews County, Virginia. Their children included lawyer Abel Upshur Mayo (1821-September 14, 1865), Sarah Emory Mayo (1824–1854), Henrietta Augusta Mayo Cornick (1828–1904), Marianna C. Mayo (1832–1860) and Lottie Mayo (1836–1855).

== Career ==
After admission to the bar, Joseph Mayo for thirty years served as Richmond's city attorney, handling both civil and criminal matters from 1822 until he assumed the mayoralty in 1853. A civic booster, he wrote a city guide in 1820. In 1832, Richmond opened the reservoir and pump house that Mayo had advocated for firefighting purposes.

In 1846, Richmond voters elected Mayo to represent them in the Virginia House of Delegates (a part-time positions). Re-elected several times until his election as Mayor disqualified him from legislative service, Mayo was ultimately replaced by Thomas P. August, who had represented Richmond in the Virginia Constitutional Convention of 1850 and would later be elected to the Virginia Senate. In December 1851, Mayo became president of the new Southern Rights Association of Richmond; the association opposed abolitionists, with D.H. London as its original President and W.F. Ritchie as secretary.

Meanwhile, after the new 1851 state constitution broadened suffrage, Richmond's voters elected Joseph Mayo to the city council in 1852. When the city's mayor of more than a decade, General William Lambert, died on March 23, 1852, the city's recorder Samuel T. Pulliam became the interim mayor, then voters elected Joseph Mayo as Lambert's successor. Although challenged by bricklayer Martin Meredith Lipscomb, mayor Mayo won re-election easily in 1853, so in the next election Lipscomb instead ran against city sergeant John Milton Fergusson, a fifteen year veteran whom he defeated in 1854. In 1855 and 1856, Mayo ran on a unified Know Nothing Party ticket with Lipscomb. In 1853, Mayo spoke at festivities marking the first anniversary of the locomotive shop added to the Tredegar Iron Works. The Tredegar Iron Works had been founded by Joseph Reid Anderson (who would represent Richmond in the House of Delegates for several terms). Other speakers included councilman Samuel D. Denoon (who had founded a brass foundry after rising from artisan ranks), Whig A. Judson Crane and New York born Oliver P. Baldwin (editor of the Richmond Republican and the state senator representing Richmond in 1855-1856).

Mayor Mayo continued to promote Richmond. He ordered new fire engines after a fire destroyed the Virginia Woolen Mills and Haxall Mills in the summer of 1853, and in 1857 ordered out the Young Guard and artillery to protect a prisoner accused of assaulting a child (the convicted defendant was later sentenced to 20 years' imprisonment). He also led many public meetings, including dedication of the new equestrian statue of General George Washington in Capitol Square in 1858 and greeted the Prince of Wales during the royal visit of 1860.

== American Civil War ==
Mayo remained Richmond's mayor throughout the American Civil War. On May 29, 1861, Mayor Mayo greeted Confederate President Jefferson Davis, and with the City Council arranged to give him a refurbished mansion originally built by Dr. Brockenbrough (and later owned by J.A. Seddon) for use as the White House of the Confederacy. Mayor Mayo chaired a public meeting after the First Battle of Manassas in 1861 to arrange for the transport and care of wounded soldiers. By the year's end Mayor Mayo helped Richmond's city council loan the Confederate States $50,000 as well as appropriate $10,000 to fortify the city. Mayo also continued to preside over the Mayor's Court, and became known for his authoritarian manner, especially for stern treatment (including whippings) of free blacks accused of non-felonies (such as stealing small amounts).

As Richmond's mayor, Mayo had vowed eternal defiance as Union troops approached within sight of his city during the Peninsular Campaign in mid-1862. On May 15, 1862, Mayo spoke at a public meeting called by Governor John Letcher and helped organized the city's defenses, including organizing a Home Guard of all males between 16 and 18 and over 45 years old. Although Union forces retreated after the Battle of Seven Pines, food shortages plagued less wealthy residents of the Confederate capital. On March 13, 1863, a factory on Brown's Island in the James River that manufactured ammunition for Confederate troops exploded and burned down, killing many women and girls, so Mayor Mayo organized donations to assist their families. Weeks later, on April 2, 1863, Mayor Mayo addressed a crowd of women and young boys marching on the Confederate commissary and plundering food from stores. After speeches by President Jefferson Davis, Governor Letcher and bishop McGill also failed to stop the rioters, the Public Guard led by Captain Gay, fired upon and dispersed them.

While Mayo's only son, lawyer Abel U. Mayo, did not serve in the military (possibly because of his age), two of his brother Robert's lawyer sons rose from initial commissions as Majors in the Confederate States Army to full colonels, and also held Virginia government offices after the war. Nephew Joseph Campbell Mayo Jr., a Virginia Military Institute graduate, commanded the 3rd Virginia Infantry, including at the Battle of Antietam (in which he was wounded) and surrendered at Appomattox Courthouse at the war's end, ultimately becoming Virginia State Treasurer in 1872. His brother Robert Murphy Mayo, another VMI graduate, served in the 47th Virginia Infantry before becoming a member of the Virginia House of Delegates and (briefly) the U.S. House of Representatives.

On April Fool's Day, 1865, Mayor Mayo protested when he heard about Confederate General Robert E. Lee's order of several weeks previous, that evacuating troops should destroy all government-owned cotton, tobacco and military stores in the city. Major Isaac Carrington had reported to General Richard Ewell even before the defeat at the Battle of Five Forks that Richmond warehouses contained little cotton but much tobacco. Furthermore, ordinance officer Josiah Gorgas had suggested ruining the tobacco by pouring turpentine over it, which would not endanger surrounding buildings if it were burned. The following day, President Jefferson Davis invited Mayor Mayo and Virginia's Governor William "Extra Billy" Smith to attend a cabinet meeting before the Confederate officeholders left by rail for Danville, Virginia. Thus, Mayo heard orders to pack up remaining vital Confederate archives and to prepare for evacuation. Mayor Mayo also called a city council meeting that afternoon, where members agreed that to destroy liquor in the city, lest drunken residents sack Richmond as the troops left. The meeting also ordered the city's gas works shut down as a fire precaution.

After the Confederate government left Richmond on April 2, 1865, the departing troops burned the tobacco storehouses as Mayor Mayo and city council president David J. Saunders had feared. The resulting conflagration destroyed much of the city. Early the following morning, Mayo rode his carriage eastward out of the city, seeking a Union officer to whom to surrender Richmond, as well as plead for assistance in suppressing the fire. His carriage passed the last Confederate unit evacuating Richmond, led by Gen. Martin Gary of South Carolina, who passed westward and would cross the burning Mayo bridge before it collapsed into the James River. Near the intersection of the Osborne Turnpike and New Market Road, At Tree Hill Farm about two miles from the city center and three miles from the Virginia Capitol building, Mayor Mayo encountered Union Major Atherton Stevens and his 40 men of the 4th Massachusetts Cavalry. The mayor handed over a surrender note (written by another but signed with Mayo's characteristic flourish). After receiving assurances that the Union army would protect people and property, Mayor Mayo accompanied the mounted troops into his city. When they reached the city hall, Major Stevens dictated orders to protect inhabitants and property. About an hour later, Stevens' commanding officer, Gen. Godfrey Weitzel, rode with his staff on the same turnpike into Richmond, and Mayor Mayo repeated the symbolic surrender. Gen. Weitzel then filled out a military telegraph form for his commander, General Ulysses S. Grant, disclosing the city's surrender at 8:15 a.m., the fires, and the enthusiastic reception his troops received.

After President Lincoln's assassination (which happened on the same day Confederate General Robert E. Lee returned to Richmond to great acclaim), General Grant ordered Mayor Mayo arrested, along with any city councilor who had likewise not yet taken the oath of allegiance. However, when the Union-sympathizing Virginia Governor, Francis Pierpont, arrived in Richmond on May 26, he allowed Mayo to resume office. Thus, on June 7, the Mayor's court reopened for the first time since April 1. It was then suspended again on June 13 until after the election, while the Virginia General Assembly met to reorganize the city government and remove certain constitutional restrictions.

When Congressional Reconstruction began, Virginia's military administrator, Gen. John Turner, hearing complaints about vigilantes rounding up blacks and charging them as vagrants in the Mayor's court, where Mayor Mayo threatened to return them to slavery, instructed his subordinates not to obey directions from Mayor Mayo or other city officials. Governor Pierpont formally removed Mayor Mayo from office, then on July 3, 1865, appointed city council president David J. Saunders Richmond's Mayor to replace him. However, when municipal elections were held on April 6, 1866, voters attempted to return Mayo to office. The military governor (now John Schofield) again removed Mayo from office on May 4, this time appointing New York-born George Chahoon Richmond's Mayor on May 6, 1866. Mayo continued his political activities nonetheless. On June 1, 1867, he chaired the committee which the city council had formed to greet President Andrew Johnson.

By this time Mayo was visibly ill, as well as depressed because of his son's death in September 1865 and the loss of his family's slave property and plantation. He did not run to regain his office after Congressional Reconstruction ended in 1870.

== Death and legacy ==
In his final years, Mayo suffered "softening of the brain" (dementia), and was placed in an asylum. The Mayo family lost control of their Powhatan Seat plantation in 1866, and the structure was demolished in the 20th century. Joseph Carrington Mayo died in Richmond in 1872, and was buried at Shockoe Hill Cemetery. Ironically, his nephew, Peter C. Mayo, built the first factory to manufacture cigarettes in Richmond in that same year 1872, and another nephew Joseph C. Mayo Jr. became Virginia's Treasurer.
