= Alphonso T. Clearwater =

American lawyer and judge (1848–1933)

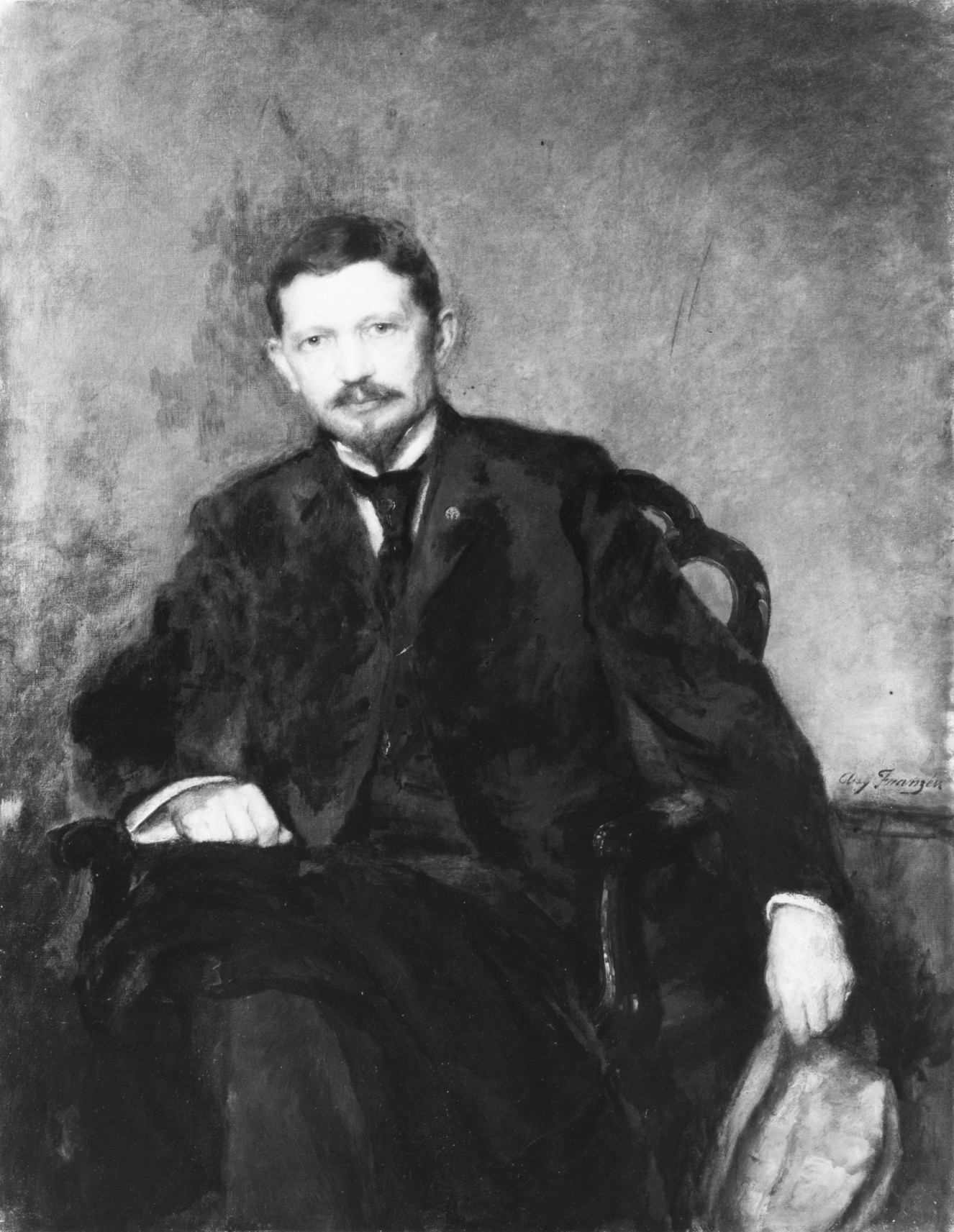
- Portrait by August Franzén, 1893–1907
- Born: Alphonso Trumpbour Clearwater; September 11, 1848; West Point, New York, U.S.
- Died: September 23, 1933 (aged 85); Kingston, New York, U.S.
- Burial place: Wiltwyck Cemetery
- Occupations: Lawyer, judge

Alphonso Trumpbour Clearwater (September 11, 1848 – September 23, 1933) was an American lawyer and judge from Kingston, New York. He briefly served as a justice of the New York Supreme Court and collected colonial American silverware.

== Early life and education ==
Clearwater was born on September 11, 1848, in West Point, New York, the son of Isaac Clearwater and Emily Baoudoin. He was of Dutch and Huguenot ancestry.

Clearwater attended the 29th Street Grammar School in New York City and the Kingston Academy in Kingston. He studied law in Kingston under Judge Augustus Schoonmaker and Senator Jacob Hardenbergh. He was admitted to the bar in 1871, after which he began practicing law and became connected with a number of important cases tried in Ulster County.

== Career and service ==
In 1877, Clearwater was elected district attorney of Ulster County. He was re-elected district attorney in 1880 to 1883. In 1889, he was elected County Judge of Ulster County and re-elected in 1895. He took an active interest in the codification of the statutes related to the practice in criminal cases, and at the request of David Dudley Field he prepared many of the provisions in the Code of Criminal Procedure. A Republican, he repeatedly chaired the Republican County Central Committee and attended various national, state, congressional, senatorial, and judicial conventions. He was an alternate delegate to the 1896 Republican National Convention.

Clearwater declined the Republican nomination for the United States House of Representatives in 1884 to 1886 as well as for the United States Senate in 1916. He resigned as County Judge in 1898 when the Governor appointed him Justice of the New York Supreme Court to succeed Alton B. Parker, who was elected Chief Judge of the New York Court of Appeals in 1897. In 1895, he was appointed commissioner to supervise the translation of the Dutch records of Ulster County into English, which he completed in 1898. He was a New York State Bar Association delegate to the Universal Congress of Lawyers and Jurists, which was held in conjunction with the Louisiana Purchase Exposition in 1904. He was a delegate-at-large to the 1915 New York State Constitutional Convention. In 1909, Governor Charles Evans Hughes appointed him a member of the State Probation Commission to fill a vacancy caused by the resignation of Felix M. Warburg. Governor Hughes reappointed him at the end of the term. He was reappointed commissioner by Governor William Sulzer in 1913, Governor Charles Seymour Whitman in 1917, and Governor Nathan L. Miller in 1921. He was elected vice-president of the commission in July 1919. He became president of the New York State Bar Association in 1915.

Clearwater chaired a New York State Bar Association committee that suggested reforms in the introduction of expert testimony in civil and criminal trials. He also chaired a joint committee of the New York State Bar Association, the New York State Medical Society, the Homeopathic Medical Society of the State, the Academy of Medicine, and the Society of Medical Jurisprudence that urged the passage of a law regulating the introduction of said testimony. He was a New York representative on the American Bar Association committee in opposition to the recall of judges and judicial decisions. In 1906, he was appointed a member of the Hudson-Fulton Celebration Commission. During World War I, he was a member of the International Red Cross, president of the Kingston branch of the National Security League, the Four Minute Men Organization of Ulster County, and the Ten Thousand Dollar Minimum Club of Ulster County, a colonel of the New York State Corps of the War Savings Stamp Army of the United States, and a member of the First, Second, and Third Liberty Loan commissions of Ulster County. Governor Miller appointed him a member of the 1921 Constitutional Judiciary Convention. He wrote a number of papers and gave a number of addresses in America, the Netherlands, and France on the influence of the Dutch and Huguenots in the formation of America, and owned a large collection of original and unpublished manuscripts on the subject. He edited an authoritative history on Ulster County in 1907 and was an extensive contributor to historical literature.

Clearwater was appointed a commissioner of the Niagara Falls State Park in 1916, and in 1918 he became president of the commission. A trustee of Rutgers College, he received an honorary Doctor of Laws degree from there for distinction in public service in 1903. He was president of the Holland Society the Ulster County Historical Society, the Kingston Club, and the Twaalfskill Golf Club, vice-president of the Huguenot Society of America and the Saint Nicholas Society, and a member of the Sons of the Revolution, the American Civic and Historical Preservation Society, the Historical Society of the Newburgh Bay and the Highlands, the Minnisink Historical Society, the Century Club, the Union League Club, the Metropolitan Club, the Grolier Club, the Automobile Club of America, the Niagara Club of Niagara Falls, and the St. Andrew's Society of Charleston, South Carolina.

== Silver collection ==
Clearwater collected early American silver objects. Much of his collection of approximately 3,000 pieces of American Colonial silver was loaned to the Metropolitan Museum of Art, and in 1911 the Museum made him an honorary fellow for life. His collection was the basis of a book by C. Louise Avery, American Silver of the XVII and XVIII Centuries: A Study Based on the Clearwater Collection (Metropolitan Museum of Art, 1920). The Winterthur Museum, Garden and Library holds his correspondence and other papers. Clearwater's portrait, painted by August R. Franzen between 1893 and 1907, went to the Met after his death.

== Personal life and death ==
In 1875, Clearwater married Anna Houghtaling, the daughter of Colonel William D. Farrand of San Francisco, California.

Clearwater died at his residence at the Stuyvesant Hotel on September 23, 1933. His funeral was held in the Old Dutch Church, with Dr. Boeve officiating the service and Dr. F. B. Seeley assisting. The honorary pallbearers included Judge Gilbert D. B. Hasbrouck, Edward Coykendall, Philip Elting, H. H. Flemming, C. I. LeFever, Judge Ellis J. Staley, Frank W. Brooks, John D. Schoonmaker, David Burgevin, Judge John T. Loughran, Judge Frederick G. Traver, and Virgil B. Van Wagonen. Hundreds of people attended the funeral, including representatives from the New York State Bar Association, the Ulster County Bar Association, the local Freemason lodge, and the Metropolitan Museum of Art. He was buried in Wiltwyck Cemetery in Kingston.
