= Gilbert D. B. Hasbrouck =

American lawyer, politician and judge

Gilbert David Blauvelt Hasbrouck (February 19, 1860 – June 5, 1942) was an American lawyer, politician, and judge from New York.

== Life ==
Hasbrouck was born on February 19, 1860, in Port Ewen, New York, the son of Dr. Josiah Hasbrouck and Ellen Jane Blauvelt. Through his father's side, he was a descendant of Jean Hasbrouck of the Hasbrouck family.

Hasbrouck attended New Paltz Academy, graduating from there in 1876. He then went to Rutgers College, where he received a B.A. in 1880, an M.A. in 1883, and an LL.D. in 1920. While in Rutgers, he joined the Zeta Psi fraternity. In 1881 and 1882, he attended Columbia Law School and studied law under William S. Kenyon. He was admitted to the New York bar in 1882. He initially remained in Port Ewen, but in 1886 he moved to Kingston. He joined the law office of County Judge Alphonso T. Clearwater shortly after he was admitted to the bar, staying with him until October 1883.

In 1883, Hasbrouck was elected to the New York State Assembly as a Republican, representing the Ulster County 2nd District. He served in the Assembly in 1884 and 1885. After he finished his term in the Assembly, he opened a law office in Rondout. In 1887, he was appointed Corporation Counsel of the City of Kingston. In 1894, Attorney General of New York Theodore E. Hancock appointed him Second-Deputy Attorney General; he previously played a key role in securing Hancock's nomination for the office. He served as Second-Deputy for a year, after which he became First-Deputy. He served as First-Deputy until 1899. In 1894, he formed a law partnership with Walter N. Gill of Kingston called Hasbrouck & Gill. In 1899, he formed a new partnership with Russell S. Johnson of New York City, which lasted until 1904.

In 1902, Governor Odell appointed Hasbrouck a judge to the Court of Claims. He was promoted to Presiding Judge in 1903. In 1904, he was appointed to the New York Supreme Court, Third Judicial Department to fill a vacancy when Justice Herrick resigned to run for governor. He didn't receive the nomination for the Supreme Court in 1905 and returned to his law practice. In 1912, he was nominated and elected back to the Supreme Court. He served on the New York Supreme Court, Appellate Division, Third Department, from 1922 to 1923, when he returned to the trial bench. He was re-elected to the Supreme Court in 1926. In 1928, Governor Smith appointed him back to the Appellate Division, and he sat there until he retired from the judgeship in 1930.

Hasbrouck was a delegate to the 1904 and 1908 Republican National Conventions. As a lawyer, he defended Governors Morton and Odell in related to their state constitutional authority to perform executive actions. During World War I, he served as chairman of the Ulster County Home Defense Committee and the Ulster County Chapter of the American Red Cross.

Hasbrouck was president of the Kingston City Library and of the board of managers of the Kingston Home for the Aged, trustee and vice-president of the Kingston Senate House Association, and president of the New York State Historical Association. In 1930, he reorganized the Ulster County Historical Society, previously inactive for 68 years, and served as its president until his death. He served as historian of Kingston from 1933 to 1942, and wrote a number of papers for various historical societies, including a scholarly history of the Kingston First Dutch Church in 1928. He also helped restore his native village of Port Ewen's public library building in 1940, dedicated to the memory of his three deceased brothers.

Hasbrouck was a vice-president of the Holland Society, a trustee of the New York State Historical Society and Rutgers College, a board member of the New Paltz Normal School, and a member of the New York Athletic Club, the Down Town Association, the Huguenot Society, the University Club, the Ulster County Bar Association, the New York State Bar Association, the American Bar Association, and the Elks. He attended the First Dutch Reformed Church of Kingston. In 1886, he married Julia Mary Munn, a regent of the Daughters of the American Revolution. Their three daughters were Anne, Ellen Blauvelt, and Elsie M.

Hasbrouck died at home on June 5, 1942. He was buried in Wiltwyck Rural Cemetery in Kingston.

New York State Assembly
Preceded by David M. De Witt	New York State Assembly; Ulster County, 2nd District; 1884–1885	Succeeded by Herman Craft
