= 1904 New York state election =

1904 New York gubernatorial election
- November 8, 1904
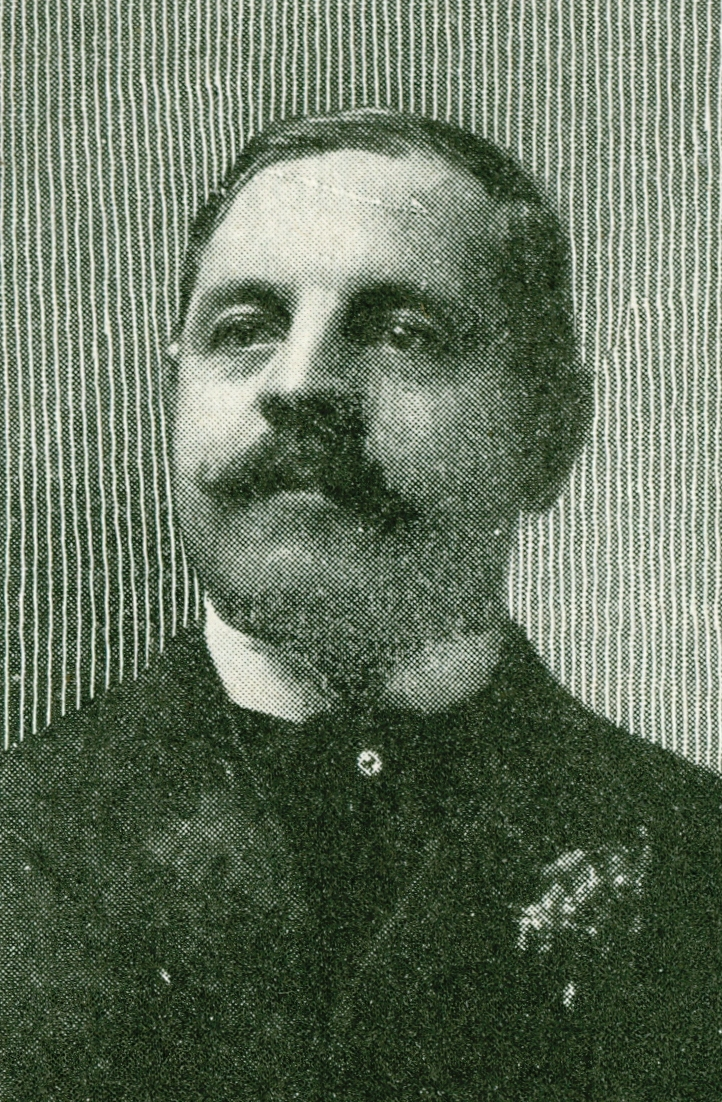

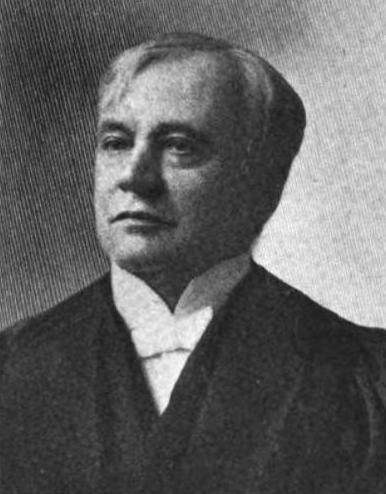
Nominee	Frank W. Higgins	D-Cady Herrick
Party	Republican	Democratic
Popular vote	813,264	732,704
Percentage	50.27%	45.29%
- County results Higgins: 50–60% 60–70% Herrick: 50–60%
Governor before election
Benjamin B. Odell Jr.
Republican
Elected Governor
Frank W. Higgins
Republican

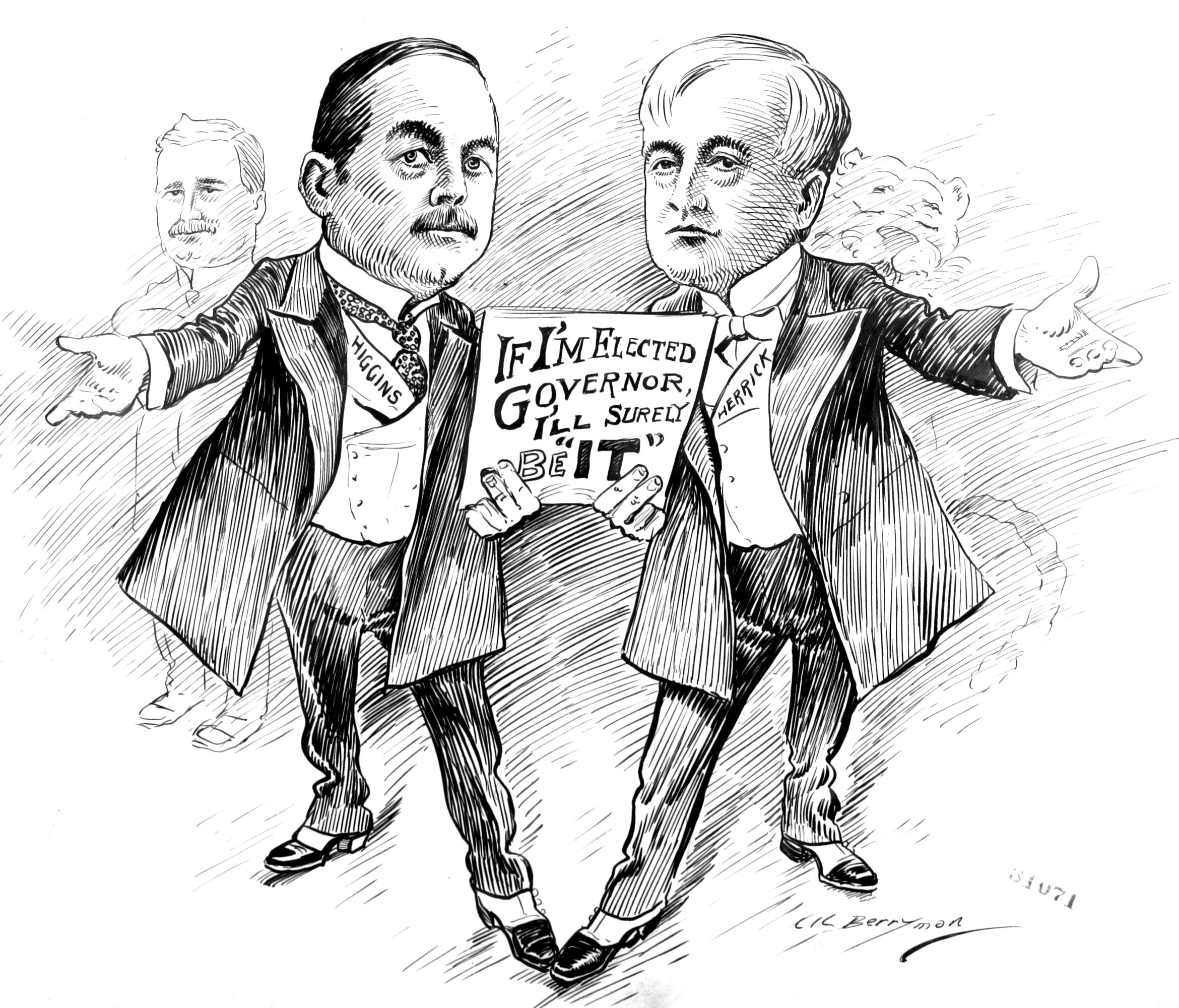
Cartoon by Clifford K. Berryman

The 1904 New York state election was held on November 8, 1904, to elect the governor, the lieutenant governor, the Secretary of State, the state comptroller, the attorney general, the state treasurer, the state engineer, the chief judge and an associate judge of the New York Court of Appeals, as well as all members of the New York State Assembly and the New York State Senate.

== History ==
The Prohibition state convention met on June 14 and 15 at Oswego, New York. Henry W. Wilbur was Temporary Chairman until the choice of Alfred L. Manierre as Permanent Chairman. They nominated John McKee, of Brooklyn, for Governor; Alden W. Young for Lieutenant Governor; James C. Carpenter, of New York City, for Secretary of State; Ira W. Littlefield, of Watertown, for Comptroller; C. A. Shipplebein, of Glens Falls, for Treasurer; and George E. Hillman, of Rochester, for Attorney General.

The Socialist Labor state convention met on July 7 at 2, New Reade Street in Manhattan. They nominated Daniel De Leon for Governor; Boris Reinstein, of Buffalo, for Lieutenant Governor; Anton Metzler for Secretary of State; James A. Trainor, of Syracuse, for Comptroller; Harvey A. Santee, of New York City, for Treasurer; Frank E. Passanno for Attorney General; and Orcus A. Curtis, of Buffalo, for the Court of Appeals.

The 1904 Democratic National Convention nominated the Chief Judge of the New York Court of Appeals Alton B. Parker for President of the United States in the 1904 presidential election. Upon accepting the nomination, he resigned his judicial office on August 5, and a month later Democrat Edgar M. Cullen was appointed by Republican Governor Benjamin B. Odell Jr., to fill the vacancy, as part of a cross endorsement deal to elect also Republican associate judge William E. Werner.

The Republican state convention met on September 14 and 15 at Saratoga Springs, New York. Jacob Sloat Fassett was Temporary Chairman until the choice of George R. Malby as Permanent Chairman. The convention was marked by the fight between the two Republican bosses: Governor Odell and Thomas C. Platt. Odell's candidate, the incumbent Lieutenant Governor Higgins, was nominated by acclamation after Platt's man, Ex-Lieutenant Governor Timothy L. Woodruff, withdrew. All other candidates were also nominated by acclamation.

On September 16, the Populist State Committee selected a ticket to be circulated to gather the necessary signatures for the petition to file the ticket. They nominated Alfred J. Boulton for Governor; Charles Spaulding, of Buffalo, for Lieutenant Governor; Orsen L. Drew, of Rochester, for Secretary of State; Louis Manz, of Rochester, for Comptroller; Frank S. Rose, of Albany, for Treasurer; John F. Gaffney, Utica, for Attorney General; Simon G. Levy, of New York City, for State Engineer; Edward N. Heath, of Buffalo, for Chief Judge; and Augustus Babcock, of Binghamton, for associate judge of the Court of Appeals. The petition was filed with the Secretary of State in October.

The Democratic state convention met on September 21 at Saratoga Springs, New York.

== Result ==
The whole Republican ticket was elected.

The incumbents O'Brien, Kelsey, Van Alstyne and Cullen were re-elected. The incumbent Cunneen was defeated.

The Republican, Democratic, Social Democratic and Prohibition parties maintained automatic ballot status (necessary 10,000 votes), the Socialist Labor Party lost it, and the re-founded People's party did not attain it.

1904 state election results
Office	Republican ticket		Democratic ticket		Social Democratic ticket		Prohibition ticket		Socialist Labor ticket		People's ticket	
Governor	Frank W. Higgins	813,264	D. Cady Herrick	732,704	Thomas Pendergast	36,259	John McKee	20,568	Daniel De Leon	8,976	Alfred J. Boulton	6,015
Lieutenant Governor	M. Linn Bruce	826,720	Francis B. Harrison	718,613	Charles R. Bach	36,463	Alden W. Young	21,924	Boris Reinstein	8,947	Charles Spaulding	6,107
Secretary of State	John F. O'Brien	841,389	John Pallace Jr.	702,699	E. J. Squires	36,645	Crawford	21,325	Anton Metzler	9,506	Orsen L. Drew	6,235
Comptroller	Otto Kelsey	841,361	George Hall	702,736	William W. Passage	36,655	Ira W. Littlefield	21,241	James A. Trainor	9,127	Louis Manz	6,295
Attorney General	Julius M. Mayer	837,231	John Cunneen	707,044	Leon A. Malkiel	36,461	George E. Hillman	21,027	Frank E. Passanno	8,993	John F. Gaffney	6,076
Treasurer	John G. Wallenmeier Jr.	840,300	William Muench	703,377	Emil Neppel	36,519	C. A. Shipplebein	21,309	Harvey A. Santee	9,096	Frank S. Rose	6,221
State Engineer	Henry A. Van Alstyne	838,038	Thomas H. Stryker	705,520	S. B. Early	36,687	Victor C. Mott	21,321	Simon G. Levy	6,856	Simon G. Levy	
Chief Judge	Edgar M. Cullen	1,540,471	Edgar M. Cullen		Charles H. Matchett	38,581	Gaylord Logan	21,778	Justus Ebert	9,092	Edward N. Heath	6,223
Judge of the Court of Appeals	William E. Werner	1,541,986	William E. Werner		William Nugent	38,127	Dexter E. Dorn	21,618	Orcus A. Curtis	9,099	Augustus Babcock	6,338

Obs.:

- "Blank, defective and scattering" votes: 8,121 (Governor)
- Numbers for Cullen and Werner are total votes on Republican and Democratic tickets.

== See also ==
- New York gubernatorial elections

== Sources ==
- The Democratic candidates: THE DEMOCRATIC CANDIDATES in NYT on September 22, 1904
- The minor parties: The Noise from the Big Show Going on in the Two-Ring Political Tent Has Not Entirely Drowned the Voices of the Barkers for the Minor Entertainments on the Dead Line in NYT Magazine on October 23, 1904
- Result: STATE ELECTION FIGURES.; Official Returns as Certified by Board of State Canvassers in NYT on December 16, 1904
- Result: The Tribune Almanac 1905
