= Samuel S. Koenig =

American lawyer and politician (1872–1955)

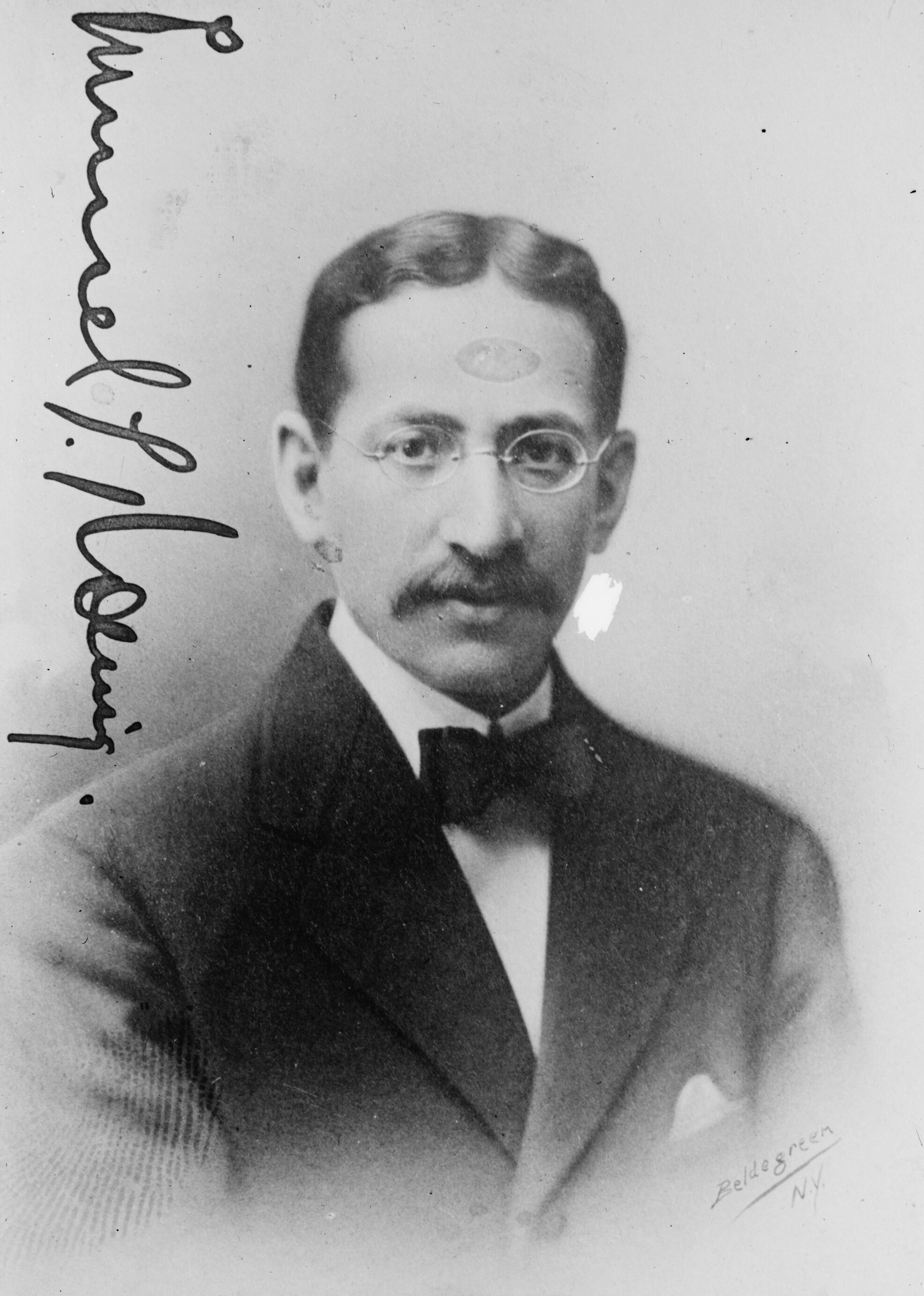
- Koenig, c. 1900s

Secretary of State of New York
- In office January 1, 1909 – December 31, 1910
- Preceded by: John S. Whalen
- Succeeded by: Edward Lazansky

Personal details
- Born: Samuel Spencer Koenig; September 7, 1872 Eger, Austria-Hungary
- Died: March 17, 1955 (aged 82) New York City, U.S.
- Resting place: Union Field Cemetery
- Party: Republican
- Spouse: Sadie Prince (m. 1898)
- Relations: Morris Koenig (brother)
- Children: 1
- Education: New York University
- Occupation: Lawyer; politician

Samuel Spencer Koenig (September 7, 1872 – March 17, 1955) was an American lawyer and politician. A member of the Republican party, he served as Secretary of State of New York from 1909 to 1910 and as chairman of the Manhattan Republican Party from 1912 to 1933.

== Early life ==
Koenig was born in Eger, Hungary on September 7, 1872. He came to the United States as a small boy with his parents, and they settled in New York City. He became a naturalized U.S. citizen on August 19, 1890. He attended public schools until age 13, then worked as a clerk. While working by day, he studied law in the evening and graduated from New York University Law School in 1896.

== Career ==
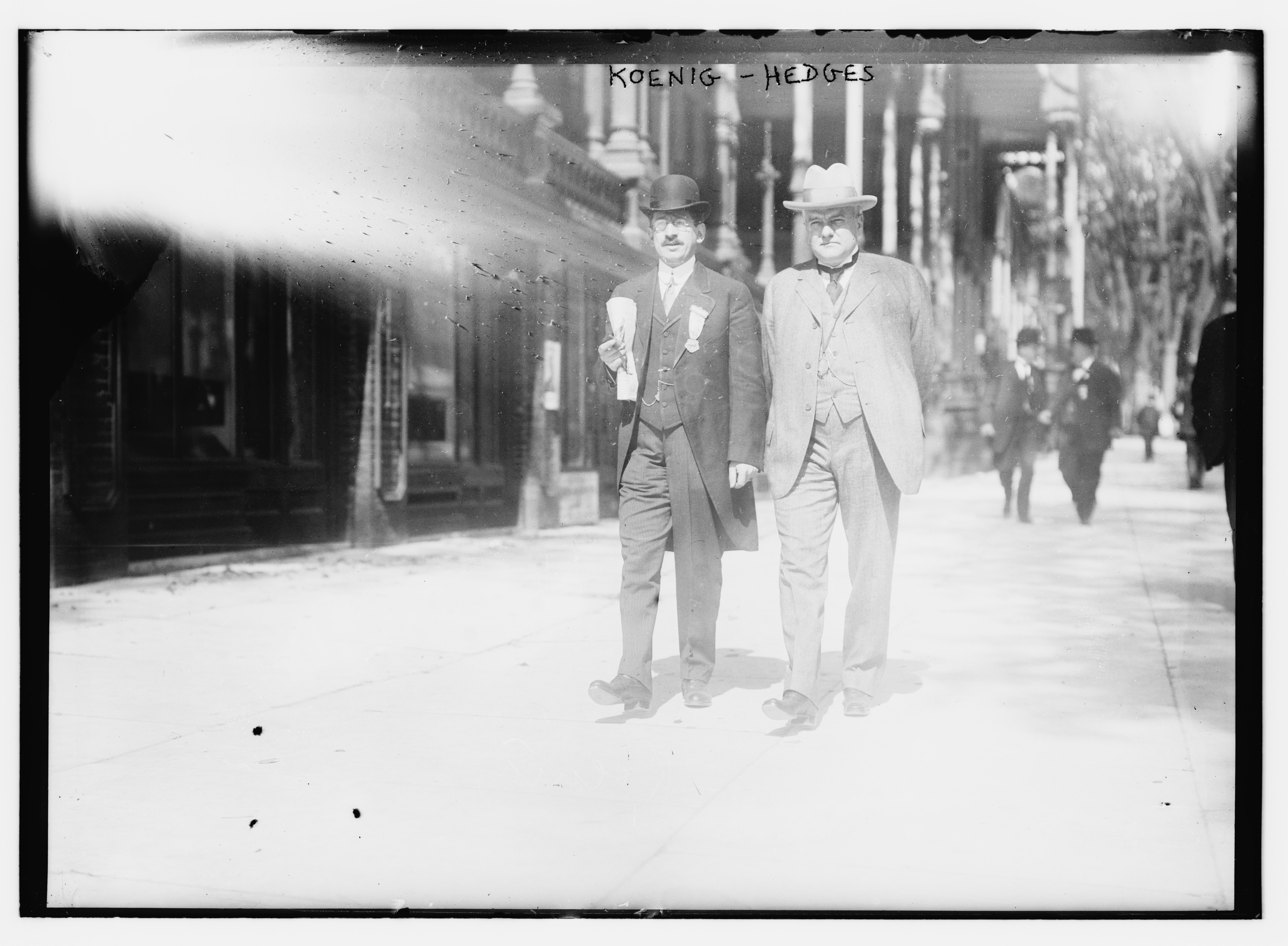
Koenig (left) and Job E. Hedges, undated

In 1891, Koenig entered Republican politics as a campaigner for Jacob Sloat Fassett, who was defeated in his run for governor. From then on, he was continuously involved in ward politics, eventually becoming the Leader in the Sixth Ward, and managed to get Republican Gustave Hartman elected to the New York State Assembly in 1904 and 1905 in a heavily Democratic district.

Koenig served as Secretary of State of New York from 1909 to 1910, elected in 1908 but defeated for re-election in 1910.

From 1912 to 1933, Koenig was Chairman of the New York County Republican Committee. During his tenure, the party nominated an African American, Charles H. Roberts, for Congress in New York's 21st district. One of the first African Americans elected to the New York City Board of Aldermen, Roberts became the first black Republican nominated for Congress in a northern state.

Koenig was a delegate to the 1908, 1912, 1916, 1924, 1928, 1932, 1936, 1940, 1944, 1948 and 1952 Republican National Conventions. He was also a presidential elector in 1900. In 1930, he was a member of the New York State Republican Committee. He was a delegate to the New York State convention to ratify the 21st Amendment in 1933.

== Personal life and death ==
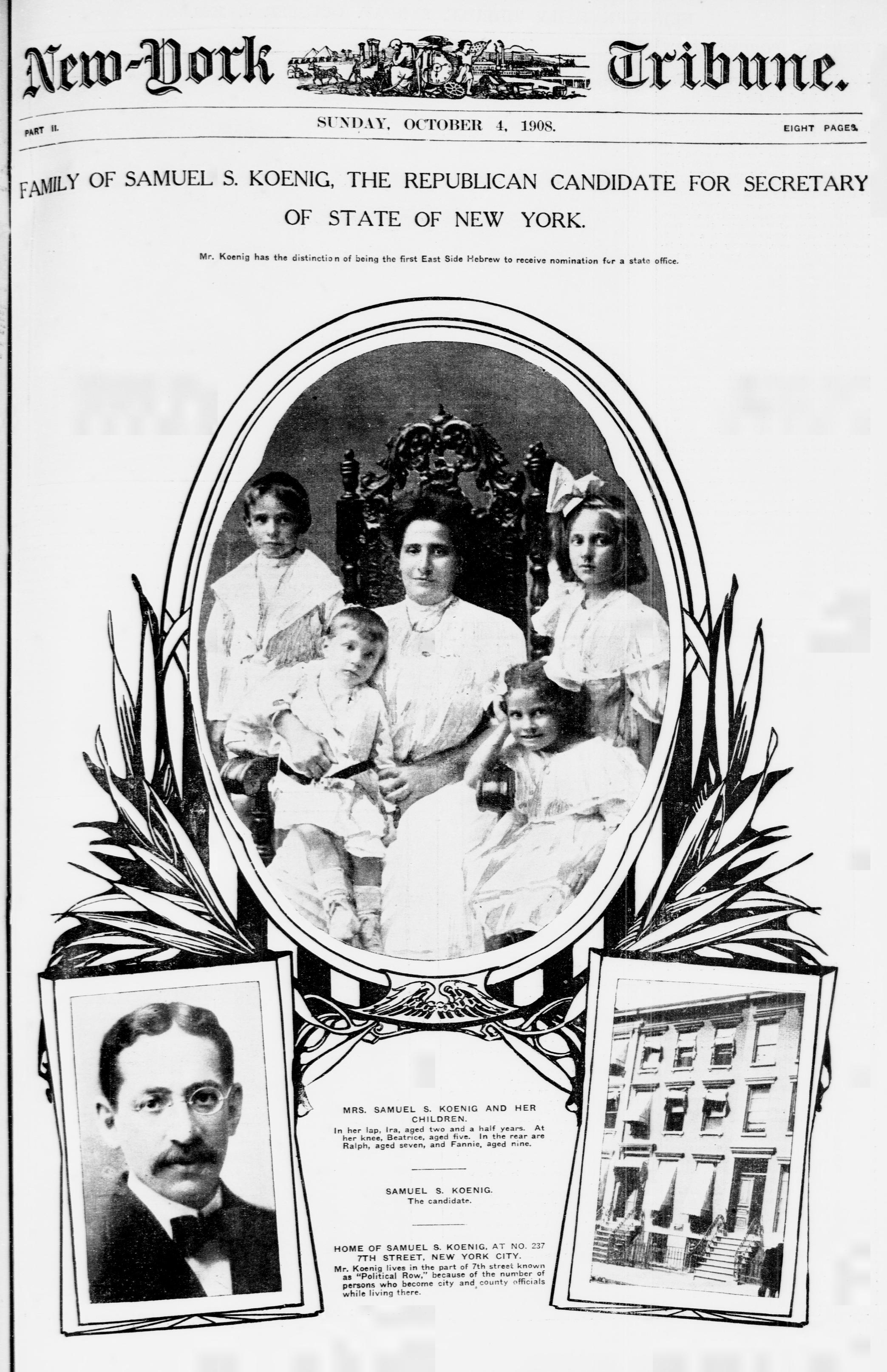
Koenig and his family during his candidacy for Secretary of State of New York (New-York Tribune, October 4, 1908)

Koenig married Sadie Prince on June 26, 1898 in Manhattan. The couple had one son named Raphel. His brother Morris Koenig was appointed a city magistrate of New York City in 1915.

Koenig died at his home at 107 West 86th Street in Manhattan on March 17, 1955. He was buried at the Union Field Cemetery in Ridgewood, Queens.

Party political offices
Preceded by John F. O'Brien	Republican nominee for Secretary of State of New York; 1908, 1910	Succeeded by Francis Hugo
Political offices
Preceded by John S. Whalen	Secretary of State of New York; 1909–1910	Succeeded by Edward Lazansky
