= Henry A. Van Alstyne =

American civil engineer and politician (1869–1947)

Henry Arthur Van Alstyne
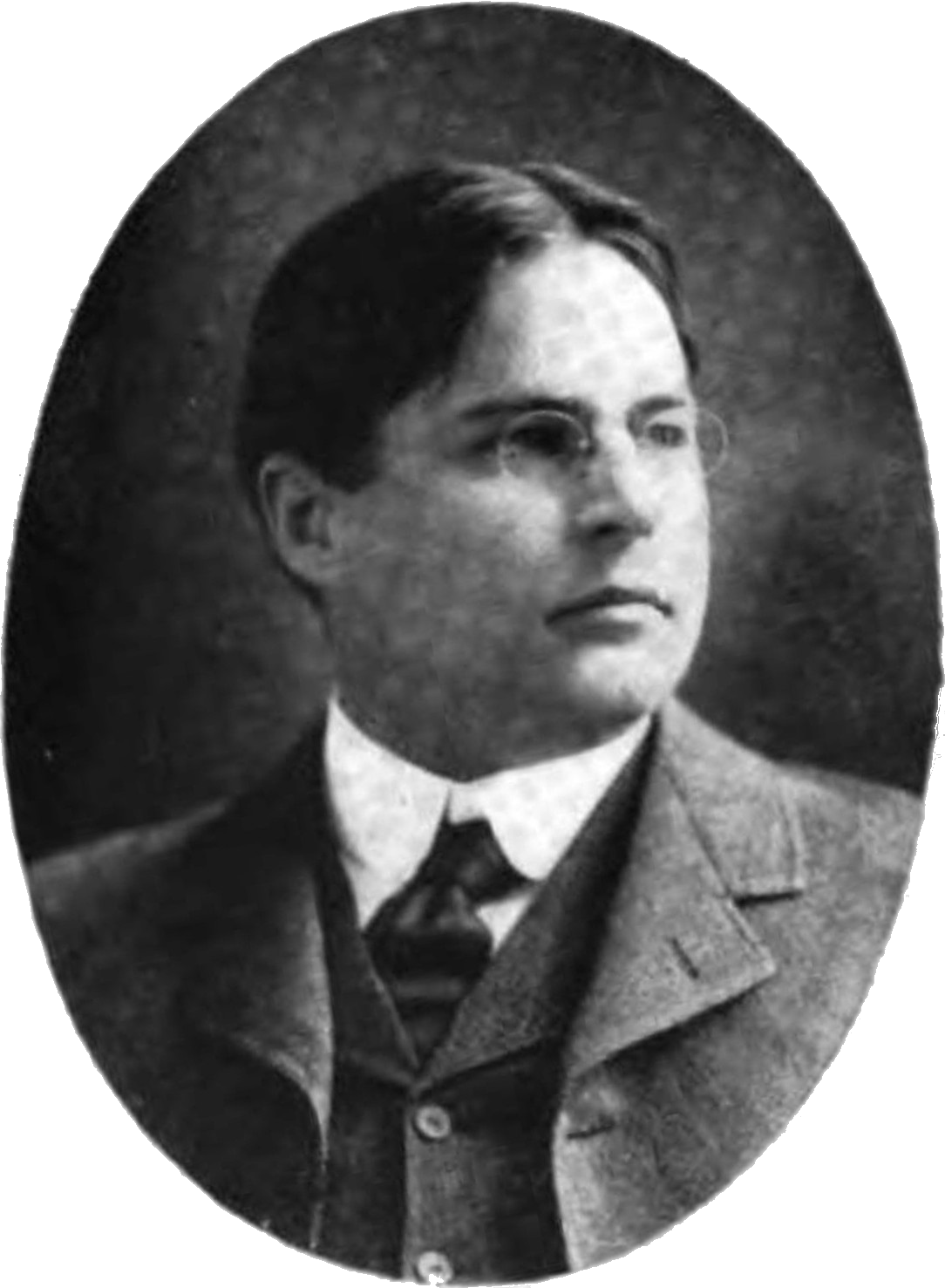

New York State Engineer and Surveyor
- In office 1904–1906
- Governor: Benjamin B. Odell; Frank W. Higgins
- Preceded by: Edward A. Bond
- Succeeded by: Frederick Skene

Personal details
- Born: October 9, 1869 North Chatham, Columbia County, New York
- Died: January 23, 1947 (aged 77) Manhattan, New York City, New York

Henry Arthur Van Alstyne (October 9, 1869 – January 23, 1947) was an American civil engineer and politician from New York. He was New York State Engineer and Surveyor from 1904 to 1906.

== Life ==
He was the son of Charles G. Van Alstyne and Rachel Landon (Huyck) Van Alstyne. He was educated at Nassau Academy, Marshall Seminary Preparatory School and graduated C.E. from Union College in 1893. In 1892 and 1893, he was employed as Assistant City Engineer of Schenectady, New York, and in 1893 and 1894 he was Engineer-in-Charge of constructing a system of sewers in Fort Plain, New York. From 1894 to 1897, he worked in the State Engineering Department as leveler and Assistant Engineer. In 1897, he became Engineer and Superintendent for the Furnaceville Iron Company, at Rochester, New York. In 1898, he resigned this position to accept one with the Union Bridge Company, at Athens, Pennsylvania.

In 1899, he was appointed First Assistant Engineer, and later Resident Engineer, and in 1901 Division Engineer of the Eastern Division of the State Canals. Upon the resignation of Edward A. Bond in May 1904, Governor Benjamin B. Odell appointed him New York State Engineer and Surveyor. In November 1904, he was re-elected on the Republican ticket, and remained in office until the end of 1906.

He was in a trolley accident in 1905.

Van Alstyne was defeated for re-election in 1906. He next worked as an engineer for the Atlantic, Gulf & Pacific Company from 1907 to 1908, and then for the Acme Engineering Company.

Van Alstyne was appointed president of the Sterling Iron & Railway Company in New York City and then, in 1919, president and engineer of the New York State Dredging Corporation. Afterwards he practiced as a consulting engineer until 1938 when he retired.

He died on January 23, 1947, at his home in Morningside Heights, Upper Manhattan near Columbia University.

He was a member of the American Society of Civil Engineers.

Political offices
Preceded by Edward A. Bond	New York State Engineer and Surveyor; 1904 – 1906	Succeeded by Frederick Skene
