= 1906 New York state election =

1906 New York gubernatorial election
- November 6, 1906
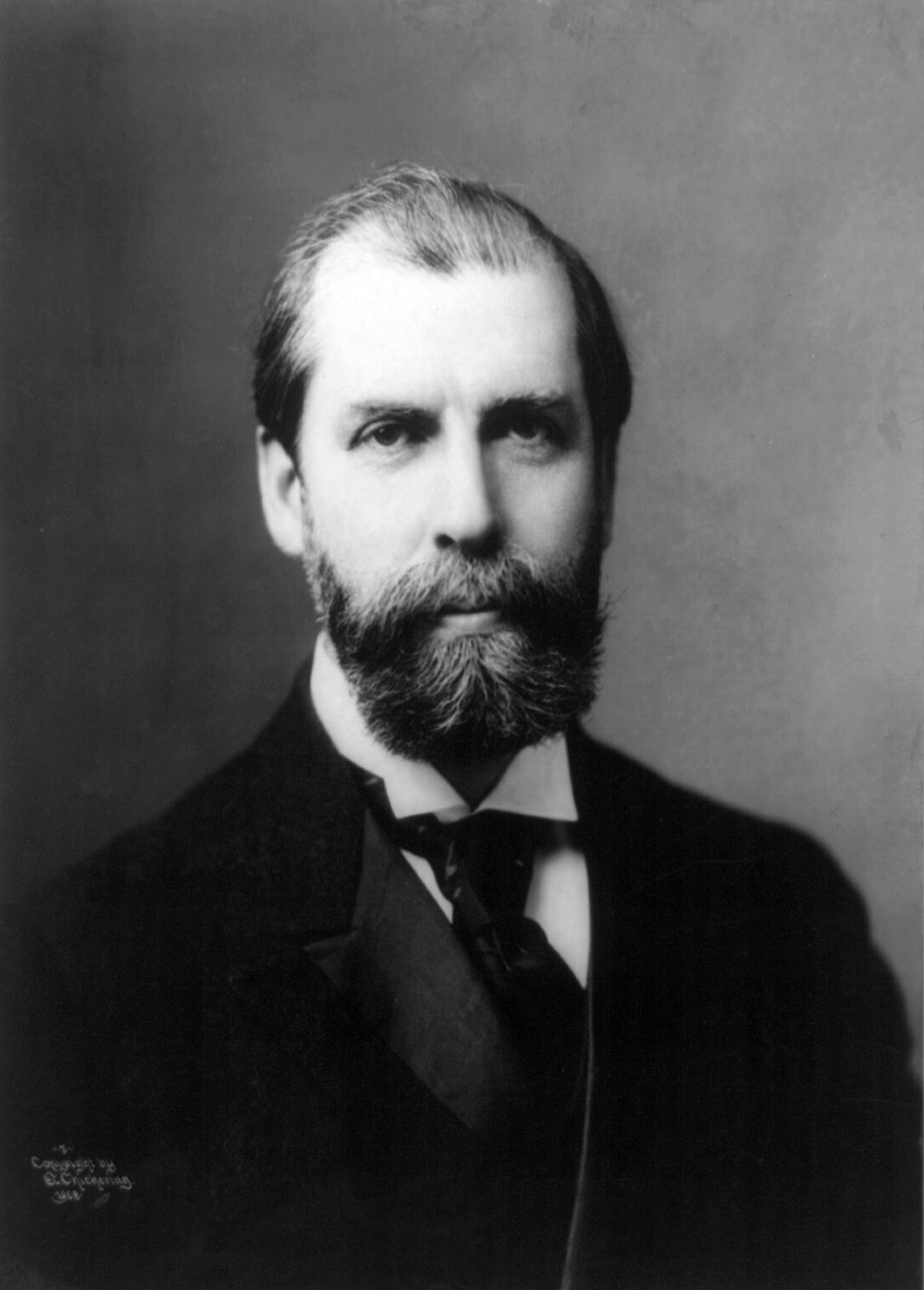

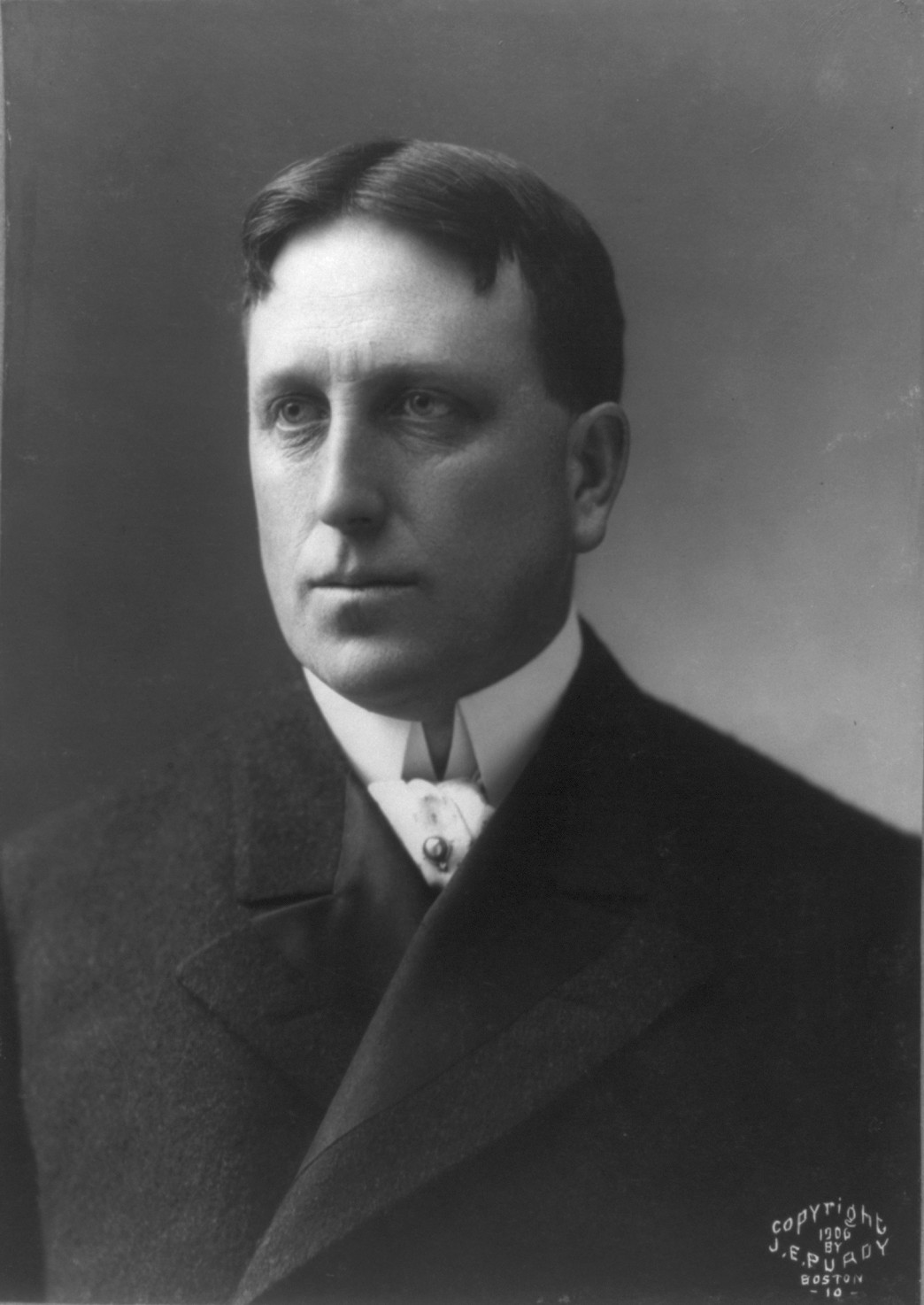
Nominee	Charles Evans Hughes	William Randolph Hearst
Party	Republican	Democratic
Alliance		Independence
Popular vote	749,002	691,105
Percentage	50.52%	46.62%
- County results Hughes: 40–50% 50–60% 60–70% 70–80% Hearst: 40–50% 50–60%
Governor before election
Frank W. Higgins
Republican
Elected Governor
Charles Evans Hughes
Republican

Cartoon entitled, "Down the Homestretch", by Clifford K. Berryman, appeared in the Washington Post on November 7, 1906, showing a triumphant Hughes victorious in the New York Governor's race over Hearst, as President Roosevelt waves from behind the fence.

The 1906 New York state election was held on November 6, 1906, to elect the governor, the lieutenant governor, the Secretary of State, the state comptroller, the attorney general, the state treasurer and the state engineer, as well as all members of the New York State Assembly and the New York State Senate.

== History ==
The Socialist state convention met on June 2 at the Workingmen's Educational Building at 247, East Eighty-fourth Street in New York City. Morris Hillquit was chosen Permanent Chairman. They nominated John C. Chase for governor; Gustave Adolph Strebel for lieutenant governor; Henry L. Slobodin, of New York City, for attorney general; William W. Arland, of Corning, for secretary of state; John E. O'Rourke, of Rochester, for comptroller; William W. Passage, of Brooklyn, for treasurer; and R. R. Hunt, of Schenectady, for state engineer.

The Prohibition state convention met on September 5 at Binghamton, New York. They nominated Capt. Henry M. Randall, of Port Jefferson, for governor; Freeman H. Bettys, of Rochester, for lieutenant governor; Charles Richards, of Oswego, for secretary of state; Levi Hoag, of Binghamton, for comptroller; Robert L. Stokes, of Brooklyn, for treasurer; Walter Farrington for attorney general; and Victor C. Mott, of Buffalo, for state engineer.

The Independence League state convention met on September 11 and 12 at Carnegie Hall in New York City. They nominated William Randolph Hearst for governor; Lewis S. Chanler for lieutenant governor; John S. Whalen for secretary of state; John Ford for attorney general; Dr. C. H. W. Auel for comptroller; Frank L. Getman for state engineer; and did not nominate anybody for treasurer. After the nomination of Hearst, Chanler and Whalen by the Democratic state convention, the other nominees retired, and on September 29, the Independence League's executive committee substituted the Democratic nominees Jackson, Glynn, and Skene on the ticket, and added Hauser for treasurer.

The Republican state convention met on September 25 and 26 at Saratoga Springs, New York. Boss Benjamin B. Odell Jr. favored Ex-Governor Frank S. Black, Governor Frank W. Higgins favored his Lt. Gov. Bruce, but after the intervention of President Theodore Roosevelt, the convention nominated Charles Evans Hughes for governor. Merton E. Lewis was nominated for comptroller, and all the other incumbent state officers were re-nominated, all by acclamation.

The Democratic state convention met on September 25, 26 and 27 at Buffalo, New York. Lewis Nixon was Temporary and Permanent Chairman. William Randolph Hearst was nominated for governor on the first ballot (vote: Hearst 309, William Sulzer 124, John Alden Dix 17). All other candidates were nominated by acclamation, among them the Independence League nominees Chanler and Whalen.

== Result ==
The Democratic/Independence League fusion ticket was elected with exception of Hearst who was rejected by a large part of the Democratic voters, especially in New York City. Although Republican Hughes was elected governor, this election ended a Republican era in state politics which had lasted a dozen years.

The incumbents Bruce, O'Brien, Mayer, Wallenmeier and Van Alstyne were defeated.

The Republican, Democratic, Socialist and Prohibition parties maintained automatic ballot status (necessary 10,000 votes), the Independence League attained it, and the Socialist Labor Party did not re-attain it.

1906 state election results
Office	Republican ticket		Democratic ticket		Socialist ticket		Independence League ticket		Prohibition ticket		Socialist Labor ticket	
Governor	Charles Evans Hughes	749,002	William Randolph Hearst	673,268	John C. Chase	21,751	William Randolph Hearst	17,837	Henry M. Randall	15,985	Thomas H. Jackson	4,624
Lieutenant Governor	M. Linn Bruce	713,068	Lewis S. Chanler	701,182	Gustave Adolph Strebel	23,645	Lewis S. Chanler	17,460	Freeman H. Bettys	17,212	Frank E. Passanno	4,795
Secretary of State	John F. O'Brien	711,153	John Sibley Whalen	700,673	William W. Arland	24,114	John Sibley Whalen	17,247	Charles W. Richards	18,127	Matthew Lechner	4,869
Comptroller	Merton E. Lewis	709,398	Martin H. Glynn	702,459	John E. O'Rourke	24,050	Martin H. Glynn	17,266	Levi Hoag	17,883	John B. Kinney	4,889
Attorney General	Julius M. Mayer	708,778	William Schuyler Jackson	703,057	Henry L. Slobodin	24,122	William Schuyler Jackson	17,281	Walter Farrington	17,860	John E. Wallace	4,914
Treasurer	John G. Wallenmeier Jr.	709,154	Julius Hauser	702,589	William W. Passage	24,083	Julius Hauser	17,233	Robert L. Stokes	18,009	Charles F. Gebner	4,911
State Engineer	Henry A. Van Alstyne	709,018	Frederick Skene	702,474	Russell R. Hunt	24,121	Frederick Skene	17,149	Victor C. Mott	17,674	Joseph A. Orme	4,902

Obs.:

- "Blank, defective and scattering" votes: 2,110 (Governor)
- "Blank, defective and scattering" votes: 2,468 (Lieutenant Governor)

== See also ==
- New York gubernatorial elections

== Sources ==
- How some voters marked the ballots: QUEER THINGS FOUND IN THE VOTE CANVASS; Inconceivable Ignorance of What to Do with a Ballot in NYT on November 17, 1906
- Result: HEARST LEAGUE FAILS TO GET PARTY RANK in NYT on December 19, 1906
- Campaign cost statements: CAMPAIGN STATEMENTS FAIL TO STATE ALL in NYT on November 30, 1906
- Result: The Tribune Almanac 1907
- New York Red Book 1908
