= Charles A. Dana (philanthropist) =

American politician and philanthropist

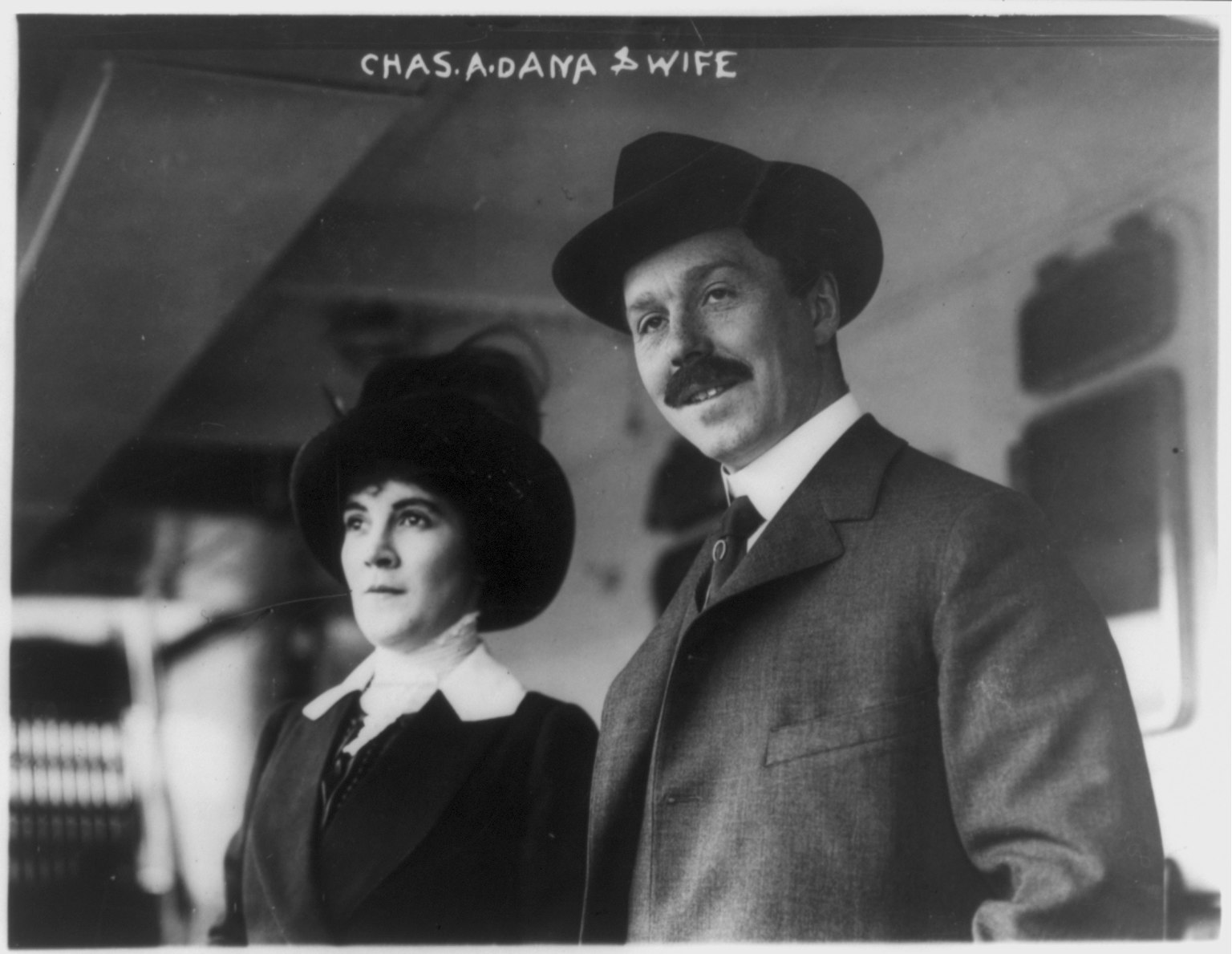

Member of the New York State Assembly for the 27th District
- In office January 1, 1912 – December 31, 1912
- Preceded by: Walter R. Herrick
- Succeeded by: Raymond B. Carver
- In office January 1, 1910 – December 31, 1910
- Preceded by: Beverley R. Robinson
- Succeeded by: Walter R. Herrick

Personal details
- Born: Charles Anderson Dana; April 25, 1881 New York City, U.S.
- Died: January 27, 1975 (aged 93) Wilton, Connecticut, U.S.
- Party: Republican
- Spouse(s): Agnes Ladson (m. 1912; div. 1938) Eleanor Naylor Stafford (m. 1940)
- Relations: Charles Anderson Dana (uncle)
- Children: 4
- Education: Columbia University; Columbia Law School

Charles Anderson Dana (April 25, 1881 – November 27, 1975) was an American businessman, politician and philanthropist who founded the Dana Foundation and the Dana Corporation.

== Life ==
Dana was born in the Gramercy Park neighborhood of New York City on April 25, 1881. He was a son of Laura (née Parkin) Dana (1843–1932) and Charles Dana (1824–1906), a businessman and philanthropist originally from Brandon, Vermont, who established the first bank in Hawaii and worked with the Vanderbilt family until his retirement. He was a nephew and namesake of Charles Anderson Dana, the editor and part owner of The New York Sun.

He received a B.A. degree from Columbia University followed by a law degree from Columbia Law School.

== Career ==
After his admission to the bar, he became a prosecutor with the New York District Attorney's Office. Dana first gained publicity for his work as assistant prosecutor under William T. Jerome during the trial of Harry Kendall Thaw, the murderer of architect Stanford White in 1907. He later became a member of the law firm of Dana, Gilford and Gallatin.

=== Political career ===
Dana was a member of the New York State Assembly (New York Co., 27th D.) in 1910 and 1912. Dana allied himself with Governor Charles Evans Hughes and Theodore Roosevelt, eventually managing one of Roosevelt's campaigns.

=== Business career ===
In 1914, Dana entered the business world, leading Spicer Manufacturing for more than half a century and established the Dana Corporation in 1946. While representing a company that owned rights to the universal joint, the device that essentially replaced belts and chains and linked the power of an automobile engine to the rear wheels of a car, he recognized its growth potential and bought 80% of the company. He also served as an officer or director of more than twenty companies, Empire Trust Company, Manufacturers Trust, the Fisk Rubber Corporation and several companies in England.

== Personal life ==
In April 1912, he was married to his first wife, Agnes Ladson (1884–c. 1955), daughter of Charles T. Ladson of Atlanta. Her sister, Mrs. Frank Adair, was matron of honor and his friend, Samuel Gilford, was best man. Before their divorce in April 1938, they were the parents of two children:

- Charles Anderson Dana Jr. (1915–2001), who married Marion Connett Turrell in 1940. They divorced and he married Eleanor (née Waters) Langhorne in 1951.
- Agnes Ladson Dana, who made her debut in 1937, and married Morgan Cowperthwaite in 1939.

His second marriage was to Eleanor (née Naylor) Stafford (1907–1982) in Texas in August 1940. Eleanor, a daughter of W. H. Naylor of Carthage, Texas, was previously married to David Tarlton Stafford. Together, they were the parents of two sons and two daughters, including:

- David S. Dana
- Ann Dana, who married lawyer Robert E. Kusch in 1961.

Dana died on November 27, 1975, at Wilton, Connecticut and was buried at Pine Hill Cemetery in Brandon, Vermont. His widow died at the New York Hospital-Cornell Medical Center, after a long illness, in 1982.

In 1950 Dana founded the Dana Foundation, which originally focused on higher education, later focusing on brain science and other scientific research on human health. The foundation's support for the Sidney Farber Cancer Institute resulted in it being renamed the Dana–Farber Cancer Institute in 1983.
