= Albert T. Fancher =

American politician

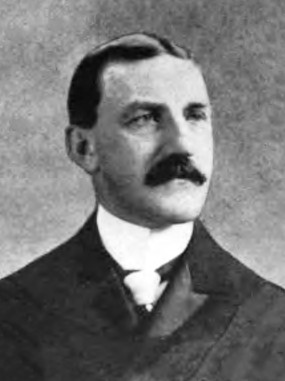
Albert T. Fancher (1903)

Albert Thomas Fancher (January 18, 1859, in Leon, Cattaraugus County, New York – March 20, 1930, in South Carolina) was an American politician from New York.

== Life ==
He was the son of Capt. William Fancher (died 1862). He attended Chamberlain Institute. Then he engaged in the oil business, and was President of the National Oil and Gas Company, with operations in Ohio and Indiana.

Fancher was Supervisor of the Town of Leon from 1882 to 1885; Clerk of Cattaraugus County from 1886 to 1888; and a member of the New York State Assembly (Cattaraugus Co., 2nd D.) in 1899, 1900, 1901 and 1902.

He was a member of the New York State Senate from 1903 to 1908, sitting in the 126th, 127th, 128th, 129th (all four 50th D.), 130th and 131st New York State Legislatures (both 51st D.).

Fancher became known as the "Father of Allegany State Park" which was created in 1921, and was Chairman of the Allegany Park Commission until his death.

Fancher was a presidential elector in the 1924 presidential election.

He died on March 20, 1930, on a train near Charleston, South Carolina, while returning from a winter vacation in Florida; and was buried at the Salamanca Cemetery in Salamanca.

== Sources ==
- Official New York from Cleveland to Hughes by Charles Elliott Fitch (Hurd Publishing Co., New York and Buffalo, 1911, Vol. IV; pg. 340f, 343, 345 and 365f)
- The New York Red Book by Edgar L. Murlin (1903; pg. 75)
- ALBERT T. FANCHER DIES ENROUTE HOME in The Cuba Patriot on March 27, 1930
- EX-SENATOR FANCHER DIES ON A TRAIN in NYT on March 21, 1930 (subscription required)

New York State Assembly
Preceded by Girvease A. Matteson	New York State Assembly; Cattaraugus County, 2nd District; 1899–1902	Succeeded by James C. Sheldon
New York State Senate
Preceded by Frank W. Higgins	New York State Senate; 50th District; 1903–1906	Succeeded by George Allen Davis
Preceded by new district	New York State Senate; 51st District; 1907–1908	Succeeded by Charles Mann Hamilton
