= John T. McDonough =

American politician

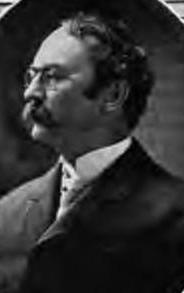

Secretary of State of New York
- In office January 1, 1899 – December 31, 1902
- Governor: Theodore Roosevelt; Benjamin B. Odell
- Preceded by: John Palmer
- Succeeded by: John F. O'Brien

8th Associate Justice of the Supreme Court of the Philippines
- In office February 18, 1903 – May 1, 1904
- Appointed by: William Howard Taft
- Preceded by: James Francis Smith
- Succeeded by: James F. Tracy

Personal details
- Born: July 12, 1843 Birdhill, County Tipperary, Ireland
- Died: March 21, 1917 (aged 73) Washington, D.C., U.S.
- Education: St. John's College; Columbia Law School

John Thomas McDonough (b. July 12, 1843 Birdhill, County Tipperary, Ireland – d. March 21, 1917 Washington D.C.) was an American lawyer and politician.

== Early life ==
He came with his parents to the United States in 1850, and they settled in Dunkirk, New York. He graduated from St. John's College, and studied law at Columbia Law School, finishing as Bachelor of Laws in 1861. He was admitted to the bar in 1869.

== Political career ==
He served two terms as Police Magistrate at Dunkirk, N.Y., and in 1876 was elected Special Surrogate of Chautauqua County, New York, serving until 1878. Afterwards he resumed his law practice, at times in New York City, in Buffalo, New York, and from 1881 on in Albany, New York. In 1884 he ran for Recorder of the City of Albany, but was defeated. In 1891, he ran in the Third Judicial District for Justice of the New York Supreme Court, but was defeated by Democrat D. Cady Herrick. He was a delegate to the New York State Constitutional Convention of 1894. In 1896, he was appointed by Governor Levi P. Morton New York State Commissioner of Statistics of Labor.

He was Secretary of State of New York from 1899 to 1902, elected in 1898 and 1900. In 1899, his old college conferred the degree of Doctor of Laws on him. From June 17, 1903, to May 1, 1904, appointed by President Theodore Roosevelt, he was an Associate Justice of the Supreme Court of the Philippines. He was a delegate to the 1904 Republican National Convention from the Philippines.

In 1907, he ran on the Independence League ticket for the New York Court of Appeals but was defeated.

== Business ==
He was president of the Dulangan Mining Interests Co., Inc., director of El Oriente Fabrica de Tabacos, Inc., managing director of the Golden Gate Mining Association, and a member of the Board of Directors of the Philippine Realty Corporation.

== Sources ==
- His nomination as Labor Commissioner, with drawing, in NYT on March 31, 1896
- His doctorate from St. John's College (Fordham), in NYT on June 4, 1899
- Bio at Philippines Supreme Court
- Short bios of the candidates for state office, in NYT on September 28, 1898 (stating erroneously his age as 53)
- The 1894 Constitutional Convention's delegates' Ten Year Memorial Dinner at Delmonico's, calling McDonough "Chief Judge of the Philippines", in NYT on July 23, 1904

Political offices
Preceded by John Palmer	Secretary of State of New York; 1899–1902	Succeeded by John F. O'Brien
Legal offices
Preceded by James F. Smith	Associate Justice of the Supreme Court of the Philippines; 1903–1904	Succeeded by James F. Tracy
