= Walter R. Herrick =

American politician

Walter Richmond Herrick (May 11, 1877 in Albany, New York – July 20, 1953) was an American lawyer and politician from New York.

== Education and career ==
He was the son of Assemblyman Jonathan R. Herrick (1818–1890) and his second wife Charlotte Jackson (Brown) Herrick (1847–1918). He graduated from Princeton University in 1898, and from Albany Law School in 1900.

He was a member of the New York State Assembly (New York Co., 27th D.) in 1911; and of the New York State Senate (17th D.) in 1913 and 1914.

In 1919, he was appointed by Gov. Al Smith as Narcotic Drug Control Commissioner, holding that office for three years.

He was appointed Manhattan Park Commissioner by Mayor James J. Walker, remaining in that position from 1927 to 1933.

Judge D-Cady Herrick (1846–1926) was his half-brother.

== Personal life and death ==
On July 5, 1916, Herrick married Mary Douglas Bosworth, and they had a daughter: Eileen J. Herrick (born 1919). In 1939, Herrick made the news when he and his wife allegedly prevented Eileen, then an adult, from seeing George Lowther III, a suitor with whom she was enamored, leading Lowther to take the parents to court seeking a writ of habeas corpus. The young couple eloped early the following year, but divorced in 1946.

Herrick died in Albany at the age of 76.

== Sources ==
- Official New York from Cleveland to Hughes by Charles Elliott Fitch (Hurd Publishing Co., New York and Buffalo, 1911, Vol. IV; pg. 360)
- LEGISLATORS DODGE CHOICE FOR SENATOR in NYT on January 13, 1911
- The Princeton Alumni Weekly (issue of April 23, 1919; pg. 579)
- HERRICK RESIGNS; SHEEHY GETS POST in NYT on April 6, 1933 (subscription required)
- Miss E. J. Herrick To Head Juniors At Ice Review in the New York Sun on January 17, 1938

New York State Assembly
Preceded by Charles A. Dana	New York State Assembly; New York County, 27th District; 1911	Succeeded by Charles A. Dana
New York State Senate
Preceded by John G. Saxe	New York State Senate; 17th District; 1913–1914	Succeeded by Ogden L. Mills
