= Mitchell May =

American politician from New York State (1870–1961)

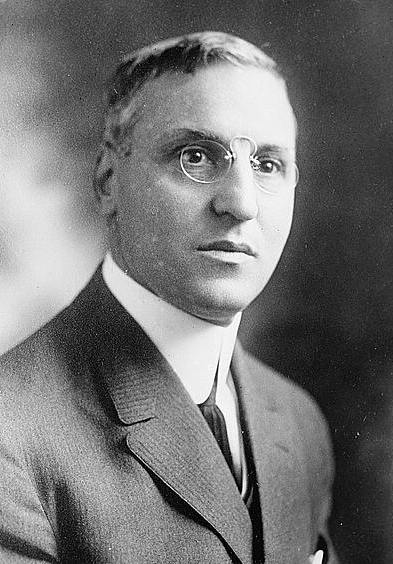

Member of the U.S. House of Representatives from New York's 6th district
- In office March 4, 1899 – March 3, 1901
- Preceded by: James R. Howe
- Succeeded by: George H. Lindsay

44th Secretary of State of New York
- In office January 1, 1913 – December 31, 1914
- Governor: William Sulzer; Martin H. Glynn
- Preceded by: Edward Lazansky
- Succeeded by: Francis Hugo

Personal details
- Born: July 10, 1870 New York City, US
- Died: March 24, 1961 (aged 90) New York City, US
- Party: Republican

Mitchell May (July 10, 1870 – March 24, 1961) was an American lawyer and politician from New York. From 1899 to 1901, he served 1 term in the U.S. House of Representatives.

== Life ==
He attended the public schools and Brooklyn Polytechnic Institute. He graduated from Columbia University Law School in 1892, was admitted to the bar in 1893, and commenced practice in Brooklyn.

== Congress ==
May was elected as a Democrat to the 56th United States Congress, and served from March 4, 1899, to March 3, 1901. From 1906 to 1910, he was a member of the New York City Board of Education. He was an Assistant District Attorney of Kings County from 1910 to 1911.

== Later political career ==
He was Secretary of State of New York from 1913 to 1914, elected in 1912, but defeated for re-election in 1914. He was county judge of Kings County from 1916 to 1921, and was a justice of the New York State Supreme Court from 1922 to 1940, when he retired after reaching the constitutional age limit. Afterwards he resumed the practice of law.

== Later career ==
According to a biographer of Governor Al Smith, May played a role in desegregating a New York country club. As told by Hugh Carey, Smith and May were about to tee off when club officials attempted to stop them because of May's religion—the club did not admit Jewish members. Smith replied that either May would play the round with him, or Smith would have the golf course turned into a state park within a week. They played, and the club changed its membership policy.

== Entertainment industry ==
May was acquainted with several people involved in the entertainment industry, and presided over the ceremony for the second marriage of Frank Capra.

== Death and burial ==
He died on May 24, 1961, and was buried at Staten Island's Valhalla Cemetery, also known as Ocean View. May was the last surviving Representative to have served in the 19th century.

== Religion ==
He was of Jewish faith.

== See also ==
- List of Jewish members of the United States Congress

Party political offices
Preceded by Edward Lazansky	Democratic nominee for Secretary of State of New York; 1912, 1914	Succeeded by Frank M. Stage
U.S. House of Representatives
Preceded by James R. Howe	Member of the U.S. House of Representatives from New York's 6th congressional district 1899–1901	Succeeded by George H. Lindsay
Political offices
Preceded by Edward Lazansky	Secretary of State of New York; 1913–1914	Succeeded by Francis Hugo
