= Robert H. Dietz =

United States Army Medal of Honor recipient

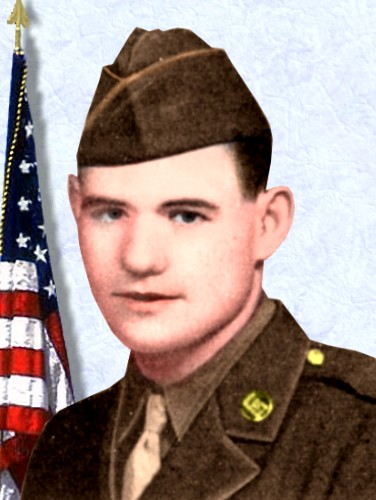
- Born: January 22, 1921; Kingston, New York, US
- Died: March 29, 1945 (aged 24); Kirchhain, Hesse, Germany
- Burial place: Wiltwyck Cemetery, Kingston, New York
- Relatives: Dorothy M. Dietz Durling (sister)
- Military career
- Allegiance: United States of America
- Branch: United States Army
- Service years: 1942–1945
- Rank: Staff Sergeant
- Units: 38th Armored Infantry Battalion, 7th Armored Division
- Conflicts: World War II
- Awards: Medal of Honor

Robert H. Dietz (January 22, 1921 – March 29, 1945) was a United States Army soldier and a recipient of the United States military's highest decoration—the Medal of Honor—for his actions in World War II.

== Biography ==
Dietz joined the Army from his birthplace of Kingston, New York in March 1942, and by March 29, 1945, was serving as a staff sergeant in Company A, 38th Armored Infantry Battalion, 7th Armored Division. On that day, during an attack on Kirchhain, Germany, he single-handedly killed several German soldiers defending a bridge into the city and then disabled demolition charges which had been placed under a second bridge. He was killed by enemy fire immediately afterwards, but had successfully cleared the way for the American troops to enter the city. For these actions, he was posthumously awarded the Medal of Honor nine months later by President Harry Truman, on December 17, 1945. Dietz Memorial Stadium in Kingston is named in his honor and memory.

Dietz, age 24 at his death, was buried at Wiltwyck Cemetery in his hometown of Kingston, New York. Inscribed on his tombstone is a portion of a letter written by President Harry S. Truman that reads: "Sergeant Dietz by his intrepidity and valiant effort on his self imposed mission, singlehandedly opened the road for the capture of Kirchain (Germany) and left his comrades an inspiring example of gallantry in the face of formidable odds."

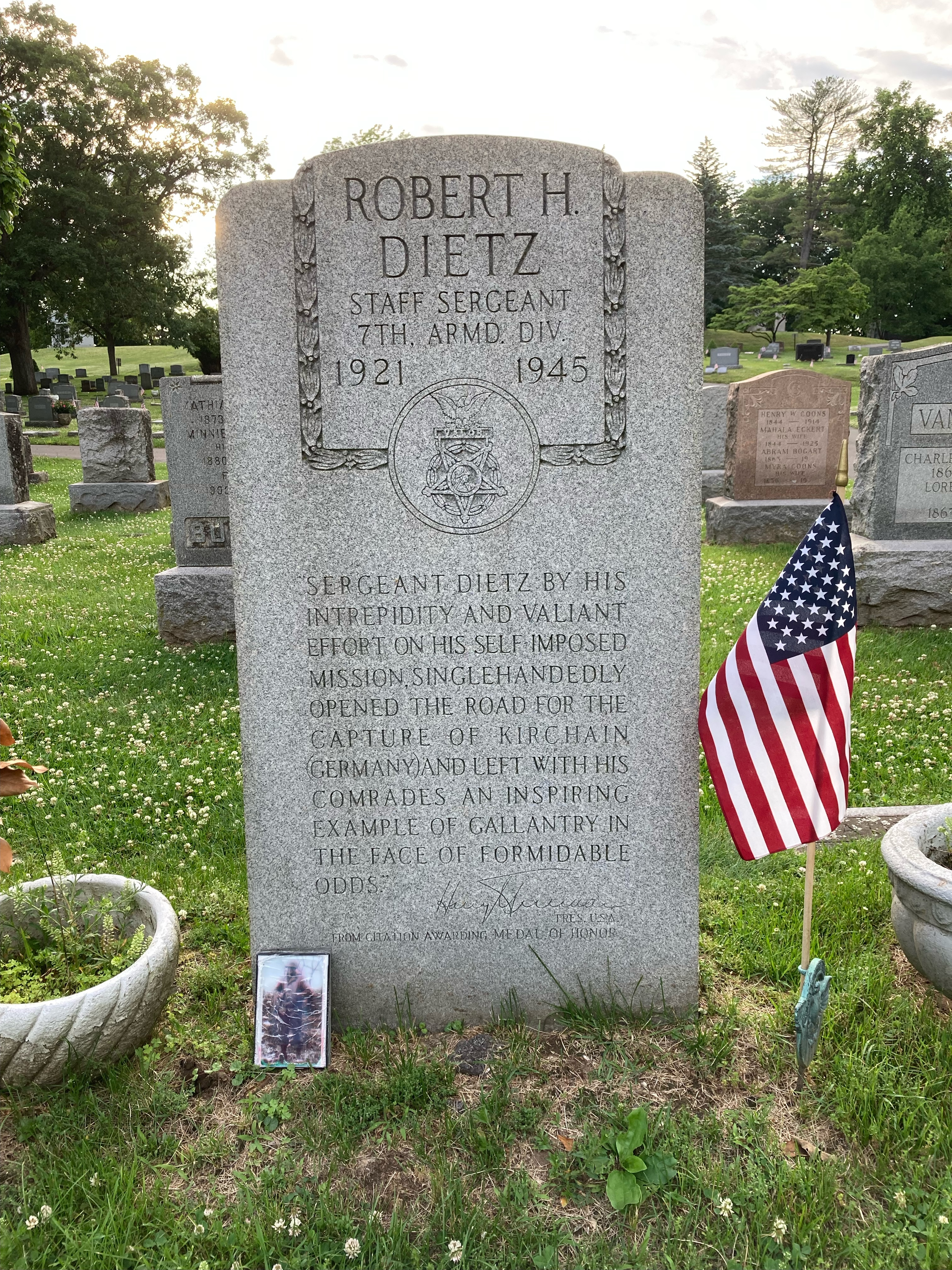
Robert H. Dietz Headstone in Wiltwyck Cemetery

== Awards and decorations ==
SSgt Dietz received the following awards for his service

Badge	Combat Infantryman Badge		
1st row	Medal of Honor		
2nd row	Bronze Star Medal	Purple Heart	Army Good Conduct Medal
3rd row	American Campaign Medal	European–African–Middle Eastern Campaign Medal with one campaign star	World War II Victory Medal

== Medal of Honor citation ==
Staff Sergeant Dietz's official Medal of Honor citation reads:

He was a squad leader when the task force to which his unit was attached encountered resistance in its advance on Kirchhain, Germany. Between the town's outlying buildings 300 yards distant and the stalled armored column were a minefield and 2 bridges defended by German rocket-launching teams and riflemen. From the town itself came heavy small-arms fire. Moving forward with his men to protect engineers while they removed the minefield and the demolition charges attached to the bridges, S/Sgt. Dietz came under intense fire. On his own initiative he advanced alone, scorning the bullets which struck all around him, until he was able to kill the bazooka team defending the first bridge. He continued ahead and had killed another bazooka team, bayoneted an enemy soldier armed with a panzerfaust and shot 2 Germans when he was knocked to the ground by another blast of another panzerfaust. He quickly recovered, killed the man who had fired at him and then jumped into waist-deep water under the second bridge to disconnect the demolition charges. His work was completed; but as he stood up to signal that the route was clear, he was killed by another enemy volley from the left flank. S/Sgt. Dietz by his intrepidity and valiant effort on his self-imposed mission, single-handedly opened the road for the capture of Kirchain and left with his comrades an inspiring example of gallantry in the face of formidable odds.

== See also ==
- List of Medal of Honor recipients
- List of Medal of Honor recipients for World War II
