= Albert Haight =

American judge

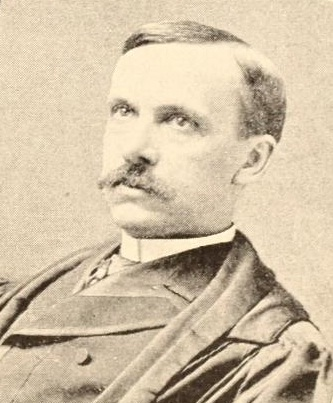
Albert Haight (1902)

Albert Haight (February 20, 1842 – October 1926) was an American lawyer and politician from New York.

== Life ==
He was born on February 20, 1842, in Ellicottville, Cattaraugus County, New York, the son of Henry Haight (born c. 1815) and Sarah Maria (Sisson) Haight (1817–1868). He was admitted to the bar in 1863, and practiced in Buffalo.

He was Judge of the Erie County Court from 1873 to 1877. He was a justice of the New York Supreme Court (8th D.) from 1877 to 1894, and was appointed to the General Term (5th Dept.) in 1884.

In 1887, he made a controversial decision in a trial involving Standard Oil and John D. Archbold, and was severely censured in the press for it. Subsequently Standard Oil pushed his campaign for the Court of Appeals, but it did not work out. At the New York state election, 1889, he ran on the Republican ticket for the New York Court of Appeals but was defeated by Democrat Denis O'Brien.

At the New York state election, 1894, he ran again and this time was elected. He was re-elected at the New York state election, 1908, and retired from the bench at the end of 1912 when he reached the constitutional age limit.

He died in October 1926.
