= William H. Flack =

American politician

William Henry Flack
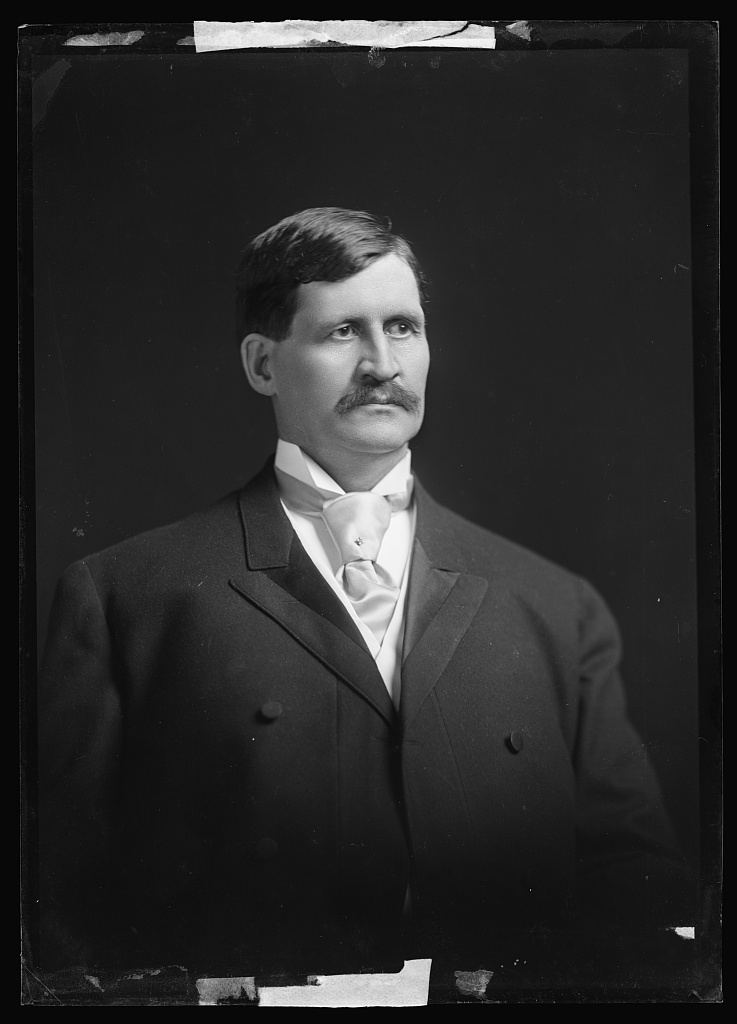
- William Henry Flack
- Born: March 22, 1861; Franklin Falls, New York
- Died: February 2, 1907 (aged 45); Malone, New York
- Resting place: Morningside Cemetery, Malone, New York
- Occupations: Politician and businessman
- Predecessor: John Wilbur Dwight
- Successor: George R. Malby

William Henry Flack (March 22, 1861 – February 2, 1907) was a Republican member of the U.S. House of Representatives from New York from 1903 to 1907.

== Career ==
Flack attended public schools. He became interested in lumbering and tanning. He had some family members in Indiana west of downtown Indianapolis in an area known as Flackville. He was Supervisor of the town of Waverly, New York for seven years and chairman of the board for two years. He was the county clerk of Franklin County from 1898 to 1902 and reelected in 1900. He served as chairman of the Republican county committee 1898–1902. He served as trustee of the village of Malone and elected president of said village in 1902.

=== Congress ===
Flack was elected as a Republican representative to the United States House of Representatives for the congressional district formed from the 26th District (Essex, New York, Franklin, New York, Clinton, New York and St. Lawrence, New York) to the Fifty-eighth and Fifty-ninth Congresses and served from March 4, 1903, until his death. He was interred in Morningside Cemetery.

== See also ==
- List of members of the United States Congress who died in office (1900–1949)

U.S. House of Representatives
Preceded by John W. Dwight	Member of the U.S. House of Representatives from New York's 26th congressional district March 4, 1903 – February 2, 1907	Succeeded by George R. Malby
