= Francis Hugo =

American politician

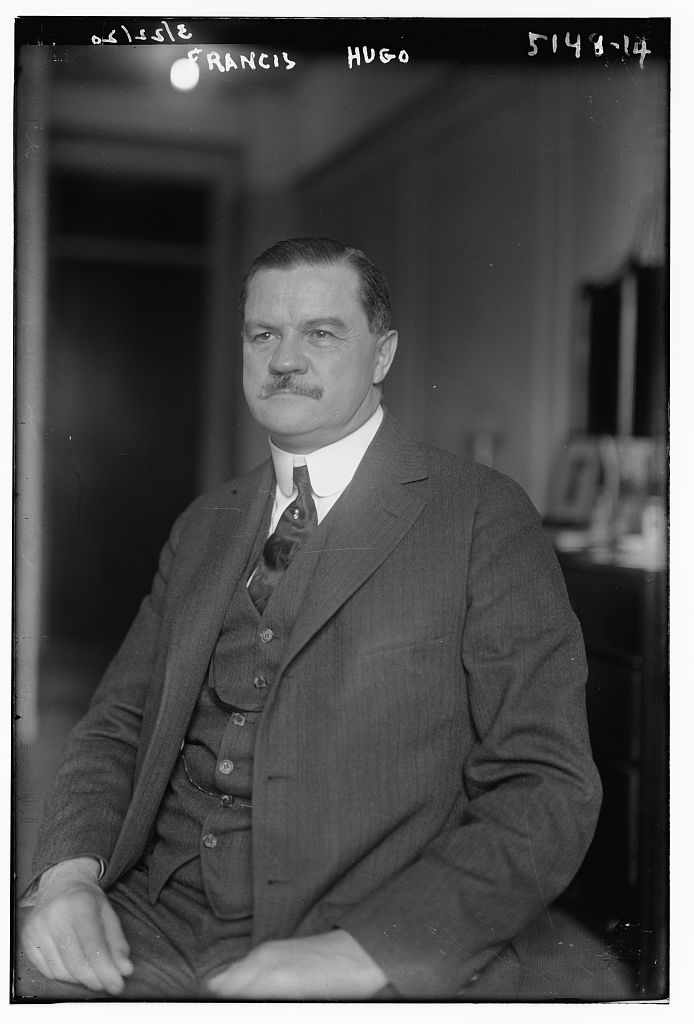
Hugo in 1920

Francis John Bennett Marks Hugo (March 5, 1870 – December 30, 1930) was a Canadian-American politician.

== Biography ==
He was born on March 5, 1870, in Kingston, Ontario, Canada, to Nicholas Trevanion Hugo and Mary Rendle Marks.

Hugo attended Queen's College (now Queen's University) at Kingston and held Bachelor of Arts and Bachelor of Laws degrees. He also earned a law degree from Cornell University.

He married Florence Goodale on June 8, 1899, in Watertown, New York, and their son was Francis Goodale Hugo.

He served as Mayor of Watertown, New York. He was a delegate to the 1912 Republican National Convention.

In 1912, he ran for Secretary of State of New York but was defeated by Democrat Mitchell May. He was Secretary of State of New York from 1915 to 1920, elected in 1914, 1916 and 1918. As Secretary of State, he signed the joint resolution of the Senate and Assembly submitting a women's suffrage ballot question.

In Watertown, Hugo practiced law with Nicholas Doxtater Yost, father of Charles Woodruff Yost.

In 1923, Hugo was appointed by National Non-Theatrical Motion Pictures, Inc. to screen non-commercial films, a function similar to that performed by Will H. Hays for commercial films.

He died on December 30, 1930, at his home at 789 West End Avenue in Manhattan, New York City.

Party political offices
Preceded by Samuel S. Koenig	Republican nominee for Secretary of State of New York; 1912, 1914, 1916, 1918	Succeeded by John J. Lyons
Political offices
Preceded by Mitchell May	New York Secretary of State; 1915–1920	Succeeded by John J. Lyons
