= Frederick Skene =

American politician

New York State Engineer and Surveyor
- In office 1907–1908
- Governor: Charles Evans Hughes
- Preceded by: Henry Arthur Van Alstyne
- Succeeded by: Frank Martin Williams

Dean of School of Technology of City College of New York
- In office 1940–1943

Personal details
- Born: July 25, 1874 Garrison, New York
- Died: August 22, 1943 (aged 69) Queens, New York
- Children: Dorothy Margaret Skene Page

Frederick Skene (July 25, 1874 – August 22, 1943) was an American civil engineer and politician from New York. He was New York State Engineer and Surveyor from 1907 to 1908. He was dean of the school of technology at City College of New York from 1940 to 1943.

== Life ==
He was born on July 25, 1874, in Garrison, New York, the son of Thomas Skene and Marry (Parry) Skene. He lived in Long Island City, Queens.

He graduated from New York University.

He was New York State Engineer and Surveyor from 1907 to 1908, elected on the Democratic Party/Independence League fusion ticket in 1906.

During and after his tenure, suspicions of graft and fraudulent contracts for roadworks came up. In 1910, he was indicted on 17 counts of grand larceny in office. At his trial for one of the indictments he was defended by William Travers Jerome. Skene was acquitted by the jury, and his accuser Charles H. O'Neil, who had been his Confidential Assistant, was arrested on charges of perjury. The other 16 indictments were quashed in 1912.

He was dean of the school of technology of City College of New York until January 1940 when he retired.

He died on August 22, 1943, in Queens, New York, at age 69. His funeral was held in Astoria, New York, and the bell at City College of New York was rung in his honor at noon.

== Boats ==
There is a debris collection vessel owned by the Albany Field Office built in 2024 named after Frederick Skene.

Political offices
Preceded by Henry A. Van Alstyne	New York State Engineer and Surveyor; 1907 – 1908	Succeeded by Frank M. Williams
