= Thomas F. Magner =

American politician

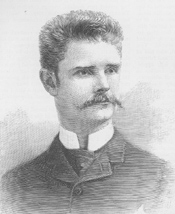

Member of the U.S. House of Representatives from New York
- In office March 4, 1889 – March 3, 1895
- Preceded by: Archibald M. Bliss
- Succeeded by: James R. Howe
- Constituency: 5th district (1889–1893); 6th district (1893–1895)

Personal details
- Born: March 8, 1860 Brooklyn, New York
- Died: December 22, 1945 (aged 85) Brooklyn, New York City, New York
- Resting place: Holy Cross Cemetery
- Party: Democratic

Thomas Francis Magner (March 8, 1860 – December 22, 1945) was an American lawyer and politician who served three terms as a U.S. representative from New York from 1889 to 1895.

He was an uncle of John Francis Carew.

== Biography ==
Born in Brooklyn, New York, Magner attended the public schools. He graduated from St. Xavier College in 1880 and from Columbia University, New York City, in 1882. He taught in a public school in Brooklyn. He studied law. He was admitted to the bar in 1883 and commenced practice in Brooklyn, New York, the same year.

=== Political career ===
He was a member of the New York State Assembly (Kings Co., 6th D.) in 1888.

==== Congress ====
Magner was elected as a Democrat to the 51st, 52nd and 53rd United States Congresses, holding office from March 4, 1889, to March 3, 1895.

=== Later career and death ===
He resumed the practice of law, and served as corporation counsel of the Borough of Brooklyn from 1913 to 1917.

He died, after a long illness, in the Hotel Bossert, Brooklyn, New York on December 22, 1945. He was interred in Holy Cross Cemetery.

== Sources ==
- United States Congress. "Thomas F. Magner (id: M000051)". Biographical Directory of the United States Congress.

New York State Assembly
| Preceded by Thomas F. Farrell | New York State Assembly; Kings County, 6th District; 1888 | Succeeded by Patrick H. McCarren |
U.S. House of Representatives
| Preceded by Archibald M. Bliss | Member of the U.S. House of Representatives from New York's 5th congressional district 1889–1893 | Succeeded by John H. Graham |
| Preceded by John R. Fellows | Member of the U.S. House of Representatives from New York's 6th congressional district 1893–1895 | Succeeded by James R. Howe |
