= Edward Lazansky =

American politician (1872–1955)

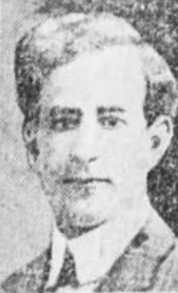
- Lazansky in 1908

Justice of the New York Supreme Court
- In office 1917–1926

Secretary of State of New York
- In office 1911–1912
- Preceded by: Samuel S. Koenig
- Succeeded by: Mitchell May

Personal details
- Born: December 9, 1872 Brooklyn, New York, U.S.
- Died: December 12, 1955 (aged 83) Brooklyn, New York, U.S.
- Spouse: Cora Oppenheim (m. 1910)
- Education: Columbia University
- Occupation: Lawyer; politician

Edward Lazansky (December 9, 1872 – September 12, 1955) was an American lawyer and politician.

== Early life and education ==
Edward Lazansky was born on December 9, 1872 in Brooklyn to Resie and Alois Lazansky.

He graduated B.A. from Columbia University in 1895. He graduated from Columbia Law School in 1897, and was admitted to the bar.

== Career ==
He was Assistant Corporation Counsel of Brooklyn from 1906 to 1908, and a member of the New York City Board of Education from 1908 to 1909.

He was Secretary of State of New York from 1911 to 1912, elected in 1910. He was a delegate to the 1912 and 1916 Democratic National Conventions.

He was a justice of the New York State Supreme Court from 1917 to 1926, and a justice of the Appellate Division from 1926 to 1943.

He was a founder and chairman of the board of trustees of the Brooklyn Jewish Hospital.

== Personal life and death ==
On November 22, 1910, he married Cora Oppenheim in Manhattan.

Lazansky died on September 12, 1955 in Brooklyn.

Party political offices
Preceded by John Sibley Whalen	Democratic nominee for Secretary of State of New York; 1910	Succeeded by Mitchell May
Political offices
Preceded by Samuel S. Koenig	Secretary of State of New York; 1911–1912	Succeeded by Mitchell May
