= 1908 New York state election =

1908 New York gubernatorial election
- November 3, 1908
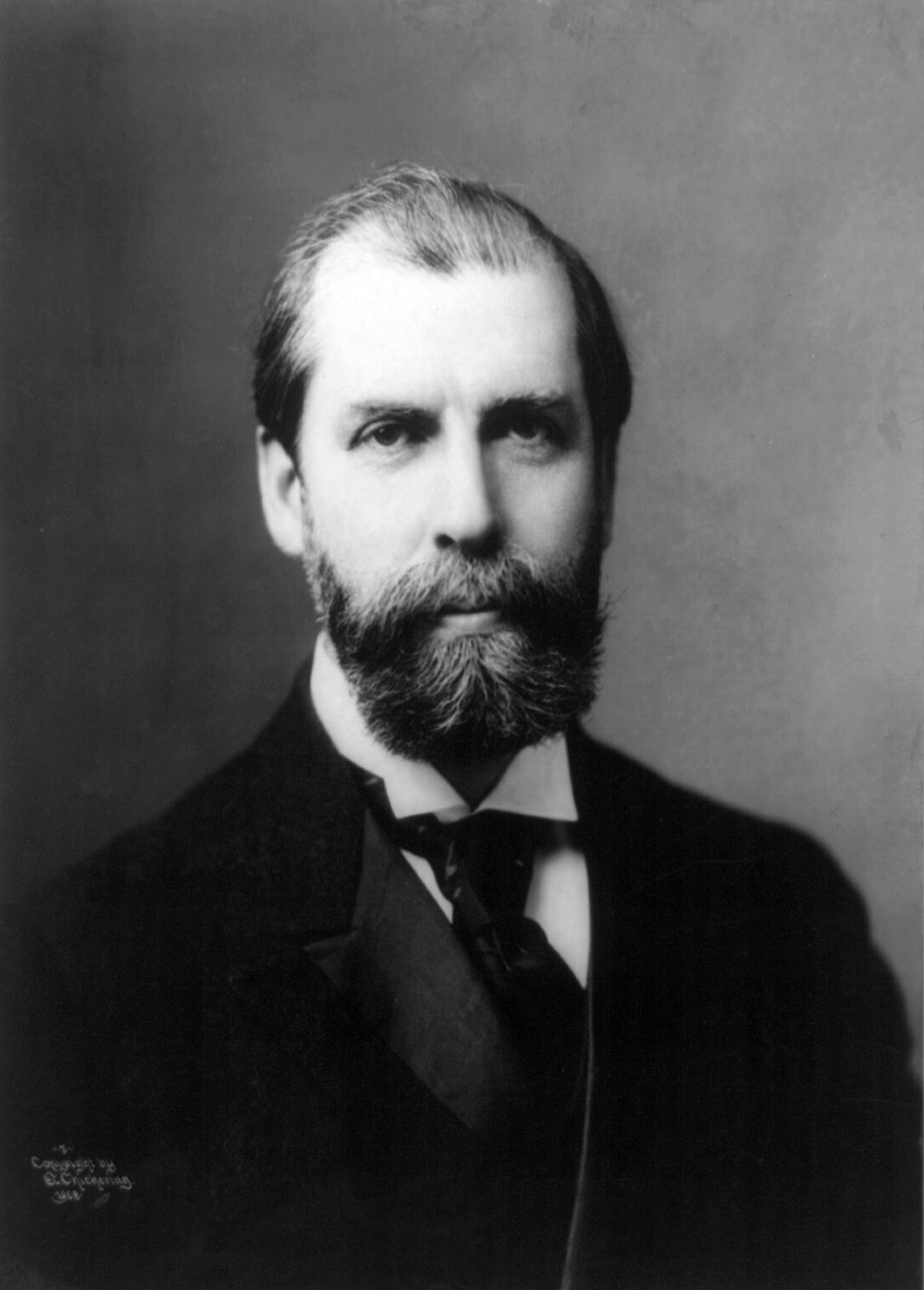

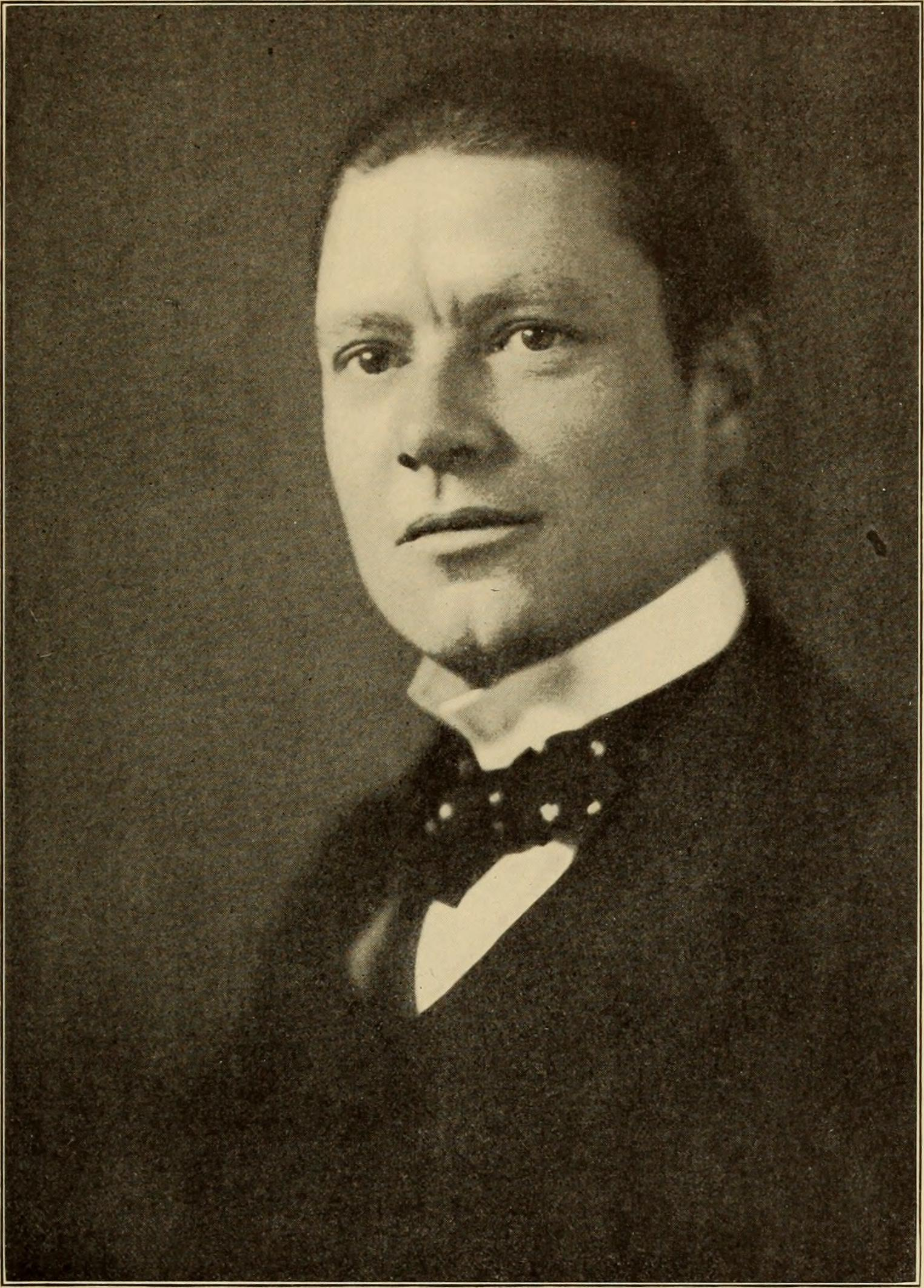
| Nominee | Charles Evans Hughes | Lewis S. Chanler |
| Party | Republican | Democratic |
| Popular vote | 804,651 | 735,189 |
| Percentage | 47.08% | 44.84% |
- County results Hughes: 40–50% 50–60% 60–70% Chanler: 40–50% 50–60%
Governor before election
Charles Evans Hughes
Republican
Elected Governor
Charles Evans Hughes
Republican

The 1908 New York state election was held on November 3, 1908, to elect the governor, the lieutenant governor, the Secretary of State, the state comptroller, the attorney general, the state treasurer, the state engineer and a judge of the New York Court of Appeals, as well as all members of the New York State Assembly and the New York State Senate.

== History ==
The Prohibition state convention met on September 2 at Syracuse, New York. Rev. Dr. George E. Stockwell, of Fort Plain, was nominated for governor on the first ballot (vote: Stockwell 232, Hudson 219). The defeated contender, Marshall A. Hudson, of Syracuse, was nominated for lieutenant governor. The convention also nominated Edgar T. Welch, of Westfield, for secretary of state; Harrison L. Hoyt, of Auburn, for comptroller; William T. Richardson, of Wellsville, for treasurer; W. F. L. Manierre, of New York City, for attorney general; and Albert W. Pierson, of Niagara Falls, for state engineer. Welch declined to run, and the Prohibition State Executive Committee met on September 23 at Syracuse and substituted James C. Crawford, of Mount Vernon, on the ticket. They also nominated Coleridge A. Hart for the Court of Appeals.

The Republican state convention met on September 14 and 15 at Convention Hall in Saratoga Springs, New York. U.S. Secretary of State Elihu Root was Temporary and Permanent Chairman. Governor Charles Evans Hughes was re-nominated on the first ballot (the other candidates were Speaker James W. Wadsworth, Jr. and John Knox Stewart). White, Gaus, O'Malley, Williams and Haight were nominated unopposed. Samuel S. Koenig defeated William O. Barnes, of Rensselaer County, for secretary of state; and Thomas B. Dunn defeated H. Homer Moore, of Queens, for treasurer.

The Democratic state convention met on September 15 and 16 at Rochester, New York. Denis O'Brien was Temporary Chairman until the choice of Alton B. Parker as Permanent Chairman. The incumbent Lt. Gov. Lewis S. Chanler was nominated for governor. The incumbents Whalen, Glynn, Hauser and Republican judge Haight were re-nominated. John Alden Dix was nominated for lieutenant governor, and George M. Palmer for attorney general; all these nominations were made by acclamation. The only contest happened at the nomination for state engineer. Philip P. Farley was nominated on the first ballot (vote: Farley 321, Leonard C. L. Smith 97).

The Independence League state convention met on September 24 at Cooper Union in New York City. James A. Allen was Temporary and Permanent Chairman. State Chairman William Randolph Hearst assailed in a speech Democrats, Republicans, and the big corporations. They nominated by acclamation Clarence J. Shearn for governor; Dr. Daniel W. Finnimore, of Potsdam, for lieutenant governor; Frank H. Stevens, a labor union man of Nassau County, for secretary of state; Willard H. Glen, a lawyer of Syracuse, for comptroller; William I. Sirovich for treasurer; Assistant Attorney General William A. De Ford for attorney general; M. J. Cafiero, of Brooklyn, for state engineer; Reuben Robie Lyon for the Court of Appeals.

== Result ==
The Republican ticket was elected.

The incumbents Hughes and Haight were re-elected. The incumbents Whalen, Glynn and Hauser were defeated.

The Republican, Democratic, Independence League, Socialist and Prohibition parties maintained automatic ballot status (necessary 10,000 votes), the Socialist Labor Party did not re-attain it.

1908 state election results
| Office | Republican ticket | | Democratic ticket | | Independence League ticket | | Socialist ticket | | Prohibition ticket | | Socialist Labor ticket | |
|---|---|---|---|---|---|---|---|---|---|---|---|---|
| Governor | Charles Evans Hughes | 804,651 | Lewis S. Chanler | 735,189 | Clarence J. Shearn | 43,212 | Joshua Wanhope | 33,994 | George E. Stockwell | 18,802 | Leander A. Armstrong | 3,655 |
| Lieutenant Governor | Horace White | 827,416 | John Alden Dix | 707,701 | Daniel W. Finnimore | 39,055 | Gustave A. Strebel | 36,841 | Marshall A. Hudson | 23,239 | Frank E. Passanno | 3,817 |
| Secretary of State | Samuel S. Koenig | 829,737 | John S. Whalen | 707,259 | Frank H. Stevens | 37,891 | Charles W. Noonan | 36,415 | James C. Crawford | 23,100 | Matthew Lechner | 3,787 |
| Comptroller | Charles H. Gaus | 817,015 | Martin H. Glynn | 729,166 | Willard H. Glen | 37,573 | Joel Moses | 37,204 | Harrison L. Hoyt | 22,971 | Joseph A. Orme | 3,817 |
| Attorney General | Edward R. O'Malley | 839,944 | George M. Palmer | 695,876 | William A. DeFord | 37,948 | Henry L. Slobodin | 37,542 | W. F. L. Manierre | 23,194 | John Hall | 3,862 |
| Treasurer | Thomas B. Dunn | 832,449 | Julius Hauser | 703,944 | William I. Sirovich | 37,739 | B. J. Riley | 37,356 | William T. Richardson | 23,120 | Julius Hammer | 3,648 |
| State Engineer | Frank M. Williams | 838,158 | Philip P. Farley | 698,077 | Mario J. Cafiero | 37,557 | F. Wilton James | 37,432 | Albert W. Pierson | 23,339 | George Luck | 8,869 |
| Judge of the Court of Appeals | Albert Haight | 1,309,193 | Albert Haight | 222,550 | Reuben Robie Lyon | 41,232 | S. John Block | 37,874 | Coleridge A. Hart | 23,608 | Edmund Seidel | 3,970 |

== See also ==
- New York gubernatorial elections

== Sources ==
- The Dem. nominees: SKETCHES OF CANDIDATES in NYT on September 17, 1908
- Result: HUGHES'S PLURALITY 69,462 in NYT on December 16, 1908
- Court of Appeals-New York State Red Book 1909
- Result: The Tribune Almanac 1909
