= D-Cady Herrick =

American lawyer and politician (1846–1926)

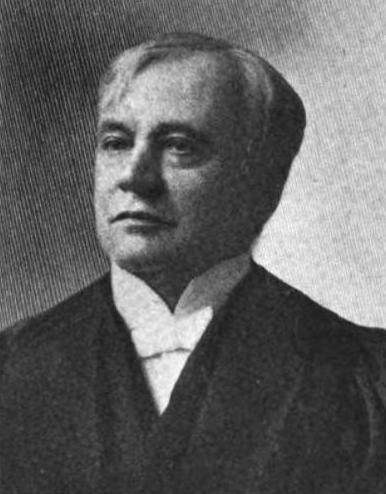

Justice of the New York Supreme Court
- In office 1891–1904

Personal details
- Born: Cady Herrick; April 12, 1846 Esperance, Schoharie County, New York, U.S.
- Died: February 21, 1926 (aged 79) Albany, New York, U.S.
- Resting place: Albany Rural Cemetery
- Party: Democratic
- Spouse: Orissa H. Salisbury (m. 1874; died 1925)
- Children: 3
- Relatives: Walter R. Herrick (half-brother)
- Education: Albany Law School

D-Cady Herrick (April 12, 1846 – February 21, 1926) was an American lawyer and politician.

== Name ==
He was baptized Cady Herrick, but his father thought it better to add an initial hyphened "D-" to the name to avoid class-room jokes, like calling the boy "Katie." Thus the initial did not stand for any given name, and the first name should be pronounced "Dee-CAY-dee." The press typically printed his name D. Cady Herrick, the initial with a period, which led to the general belief that the initial stood indeed for an abbreviated first name. Many people thought it was "Daniel," after Daniel Cady, and The New York Times printed in 1904 "Donald" Cady Herrick as the Democratic nominee for governor. He was not the first New York politician to use an extra "D" which did not stand for any name; Daniel D. Tompkins added the middle initial to distinguish himself from another Daniel Tompkins while studying at Columbia College.

== Life ==
He born on April 12, 1846, in Esperance, Schoharie County, New York, the son of Assemblyman Jonathan R. Herrick (1818–1890) and his first wife Harriet E. (Deuel) Herrick (1825–1856). In 1852, the family removed to Albany, New York.

He graduated from the Albany Classical Institute, and then studied law in the office of Lyman Tremain and Rufus W. Peckham, Sr. They sent him to Albany Law School where he was a classmate of William McKinley. He graduated in 1868, and was admitted to the bar. In 1874, he married Orissa H. Salisbury (d. 1925), and they had three children.

In 1877, Herrick was defeated for District Attorney of Albany County, but in 1880 was re-nominated and elected, and he was re-elected in 1883. He became the chief lieutenant of Daniel Manning, the Democratic boss of Albany. When Manning moved to Washington, D.C. to serve as U.S. Secretary of the Treasury in 1885, Herrick became the Democratic boss of Albany and continued in this role even after becoming a judge on the New York Supreme Court.

In 1886, Herrick resigned as district attorney, and became Corporation Counsel of Albany. In 1888, he was permanent chairman of the Democratic state convention.

In 1891, he was elected to a fourteen-year term on the New York Supreme Court (3rd District), defeating Republican John T. McDonough. He sat on the Appellate Division (Third Department) from 1896 to 1900.

In 1891, he fined the members of the State Board of Canvassers, all Democrats, for their certification of the election returns from Dutchess County, which gave the 15th District seat in the New York State Senate to Democrat Edward B. Osborne, and enabled Democrats to gain control of the State Senate.

In 1897, he overruled the Republican Secretary of State John Palmer's decision to certify the nomination of a candidate for Chief Judge by the "United Democracy".

In 1904, he was nominated for Governor of New York, and resigned from the bench. He was defeated by Republican Frank W. Higgins, and afterwards resumed the practice of law at Albany and New York City.

He was buried at the Albany Rural Cemetery in Menands, New York.

State Senator Walter R. Herrick (born 1877) was his half-brother.

== Sources ==
- THE DEMOCRATIC CANDIDATES in NYT on September 22, 1904
- EX-JUSTICE HERRICK DIES IN 80TH YEAR in NYT on February 22, 1926 (subscription required)
- How He Became "D." Cady Herrick in NYT on September 23, 1904 [apparently correcting the earlier printed "Donald"]
- Short bio at The Albany Institute
- Bio at NY Court History (with portrait)
- Notables buried at Albany Rural Cemetery
- HERRICK, JUST JUDGE AND ABLE POLITICIAN in NYT on September 25, 1904
- KATHARINE L. GRIFFIN HAS CHURCH WEDDING; Married to D-Cady Herrick 2d in Northeast Harbor, Me. in NYT on July 1, 1941 (subscription required)

Party political offices
Preceded by Bird Sim Coler	Democratic nominee for Governor of New York; 1904	Succeeded by William Randolph Hearst
