= John Sibley Whalen =

American politician (1868–1913)

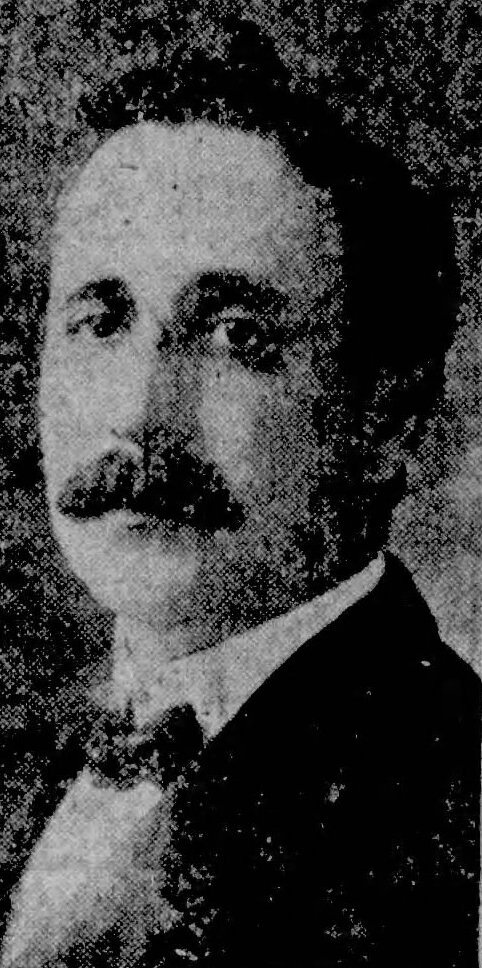
- Whalen in a 1910 newspaper

Secretary of State of New York
- In office January 1, 1907 – December 31, 1908
- Preceded by: John F. O'Brien
- Succeeded by: Samuel S. Koenig

Personal details
- Born: June 30, 1868 Rochester, New York, U.S.
- Died: May 3, 1913 (aged 44) Rochester, New York, U.S.
- Party: Independence
- Occupation: Politician

John Sibley Whalen (June 30, 1868 – May 3, 1913) was an American politician. A member of the Independence Party, he served as Secretary of State of New York from 1907 to 1908.

== Early life ==
John Sibley Whalen was born on June 30, 1868, in Rochester, New York, to Richard Whalen, one of the oldest tobacconists in the United States. He graduated from St. Patrick's Parochial School, Rochester High School, and Rochester Business Institute.

== Career ==
He then engaged in the cigar and tobacco business in Norwich and Oneonta, New York, later returning to Rochester to work for his father's company. He was a member of the Tobacco Workers' Union and President of the Rochester Trade and Labor Council. His high standing in labor circles resulted in his selection by Governor John Alden Dix as First Deputy State Labor Commissioner, and he was nominated for New York Secretary of State by the Independence League, and endorsed by the Democratic Party, and elected in November 1906. In 1908, he was defeated for re-election. He served as deputy commissioner of labor for New York, from 1911 until his death.

== Death ==
Whalen died at his home in Rochester, New York, on May 3, 1913.

Party political offices
Preceded by John Pallace Jr.	Democratic nominee for Secretary of State of New York; 1906, 1908	Succeeded by Edward Lazansky
Political offices
Preceded by John F. O'Brien	New York Secretary of State; 1907–1908	Succeeded by Samuel S. Koenig
