= James R. Howe =

American politician

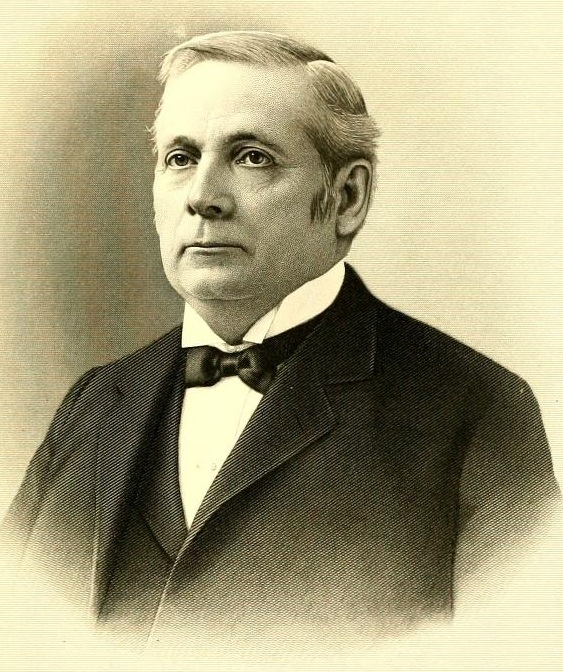

Member of the U.S. House of Representatives from New York's 6th district
- In office March 4, 1895 – March 3, 1899
- Preceded by: Thomas F. Magner
- Succeeded by: Mitchell May

Personal details
- Born: January 27, 1839 New York, New York
- Died: September 21, 1914 (aged 75) North Salem, New York
- Resting place: Green-Wood Cemetery
- Party: Republican

James Robinson Howe (January 27, 1839 – September 21, 1914) was a U.S. representative from New York.

== Biography ==
Born in New York City on January 27, 1839, Howe attended the common schools. He was employed as a clerk in a dry-goods store. He moved to Brooklyn in 1870 and engaged in the dry-goods business.

Howe was elected as a Republican to the Fifty-fourth and Fifty-fifth Congresses (March 4, 1895 – March 3, 1899). He declined to be a candidate for renomination in 1898. Register of Kings County 1900–1902. He served as director of several banks. He died in North Salem, New York, on September 21, 1914. He was interred in Green-Wood Cemetery, Brooklyn.

U.S. House of Representatives
Preceded by Thomas F. Magner	Member of the U.S. House of Representatives from New York's 6th congressional district 1895–1899	Succeeded by Mitchell May
