= Matthew Linn Bruce =

American politician (1860–1936)

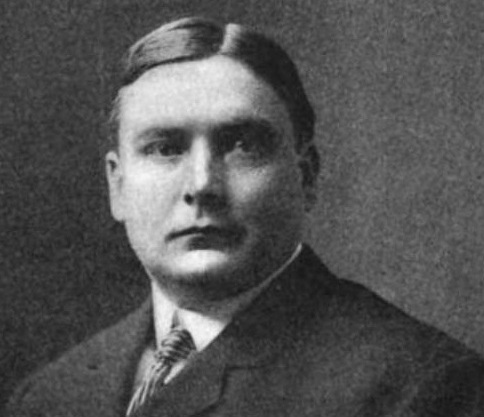
- Bruce as depicted in the October 1904 edition of The Caledonian magazine

Lieutenant Governor of New York
- In office January 1, 1905 – December 5, 1906
- Governor: Frank W. Higgins
- Preceded by: Frank W. Higgins
- Succeeded by: John Raines (acting)

Personal details
- Born: October 1, 1860 Mercersburg, Pennsylvania, U.S.
- Died: February 26, 1936 (aged 75) Albany, New York, U.S.
- Resting place: Andes Cemetery, Andes, New York
- Party: Republican
- Education: Rutgers College
- Occupation: Attorney

Matthew Linn Bruce (October 1, 1860 – February 26, 1936) was an American lawyer and politician from New York.

== Early life and education ==
Bruce was born October 1, 1860, in Mercersburg, Pennsylvania. He was the son of Dr. James Bruce and Mary (Linn) Bruce (c. 1830 – 1907). He was educated at Andes Academy, and graduated A.B. from Rutgers College as valedictorian of the class of 1884. Then he studied law in the office of Cassius M. Shaw at Andes, N.Y., and was admitted to the bar in 1889.

== Career ==
In 1890 Bruce moved to New York City where he resided in the Twenty-first Assembly District. He was managing clerk in the office of Hector M. Hitchings until 1892, and then opened his own law office. In 1894, he married Lillian (Ballantine) Knapp, and they had four children.

In 1903, he was president of the New York County Republican Committee, and conducted the unsuccessful campaign of Mayor Seth Low for re-election.

He was the lieutenant governor of New York from 1905 to 1906, elected in 1904, but defeated for re-election in November 1906 although his running mate Charles Evans Hughes was elected governor. All other Republican candidates were defeated by the nominees of the Democratic/Independence League fusion ticket. On December 5, 1906, he resigned and was appointed by Governor Frank W. Higgins a justice of the New York Supreme Court to fill the vacancy caused by the resignation of Justice Morgan J. O'Brien, and remained on the bench until the end of 1907. In 1908, he resumed the practice of law, but on October 13 of the same year he was reappointed to the Supreme Court by Gov. Hughes to fill the vacancy caused by the resignation of Justice David Leventritt, and remained on the bench until the end of the year. In November 1908, he ran for the Supreme Court on the Republican ticket to succeed himself, but was defeated by the Democratic candidate Irving Lehman.

== Sources ==
- The Rep. nominees, in NYT on September 16, 1904
- Bruce resigned and appointed justice, in NYT on December 6, 1906
- Political Graveyard
- His mother's obit, transcribed from Brooklyn Standard Union of at RootsWeb
- Bios of Men of 1914, transcribed from Builders of Our Nation (American Publishers' Association, 1915)

Party political offices
Preceded by Frank W. Higgins	Republican nominee for Lieutenant Governor of New York; 1904, 1906	Succeeded by Horace White
Political offices
Preceded by Frank W. Higgins	Lieutenant Governor of New York; 1905–1906	Succeeded by John Raines; Acting
