= Edward A. Bond =

American civil engineer and politician

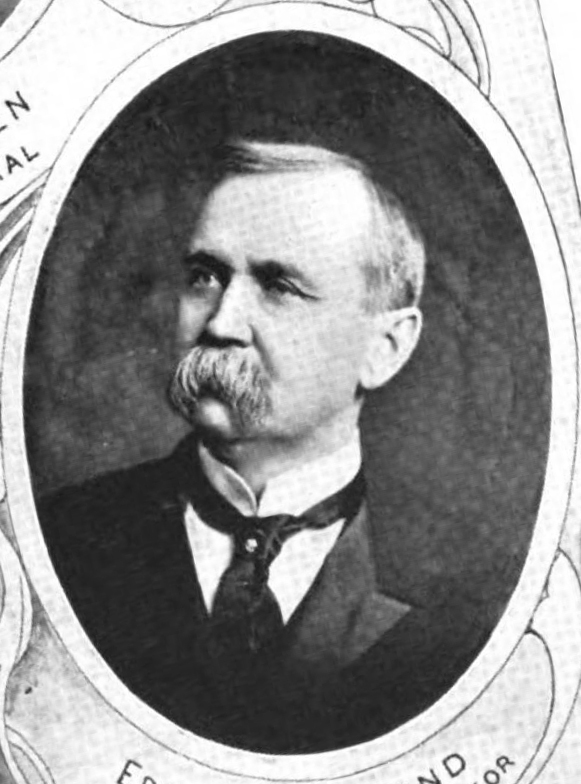
Edward A. Bond (1903)

Edward Austin Bond (April 22, 1849 in Dexter, Washtenaw County, Michigan – December 10, 1929 in New York City) was an American civil engineer and politician from New York. He was New York State Engineer and Surveyor from 1899 to 1904.

== Life ==
He was the son of Hollis Bond and Emily (Faxon) Bond. He was educated in the public schools of Michigan and at the Business College of Utica, New York. From 1867 to 1870, he was in the employ of the Delaware, Lackawanna and Western Railroad between Utica and Binghamton. On November 11, 1873, he married Gertrude Hollenbeck (d. 1903).

In 1875, he was appointed Assistant to Chief Engineer Thomas W. Spencer of the Utica and Black River Railroad. After Spencer's resignation, Bond became Chief Engineer, a position he held until 1886. He was in charge of the construction of the railroad from Louisville, New York, to Clayton, New York, and Ogdensburg, New York. In 1886, he was appointed Chief Engineer and General Manager of the Carthage and Adirondack Railroad from Carthage, New York to Benson Mines and the Oswegatchie River. Removing to Watertown, New York, in 1889, he became a partner in the engineering firm of Hinds and Bond. In 1896 the firm dissolved, and Bond continued the business alone. In 1898, he was President of the Barrie and Napanee Water Works of Ontario, Canada.

He was New York State Engineer and Surveyor from 1899 to 1904, elected in 1898, 1900, and 1902 on the Republican ticket. He resigned on May 1, 1904, and became Chairman of the Advisory Board of Consulting Engineers for the Improvement of the NY State Canals.

On November 10, 1904, he married Clara Estelle Ellis (1849–1907).

He was a member of the American Society of Civil Engineers.

== Sources ==
- Bio transcribed from Our County and Its People: A Descriptive Work on Jefferson County, New York ed. by Edgar C. Emerson (The Boston History Co., Publishers, Syracuse NY, 1898) [gives wrong birth year]
- His brother's and his first wife's deaths, in NYT on April 1, 1903
- His second wife's death, in NYT on October 3, 1907

Political offices
Preceded by Campbell W. Adams	New York State Engineer and Surveyor; 1899–1904	Succeeded by Henry A. Van Alstyne
