= George R. Malby =

American politician

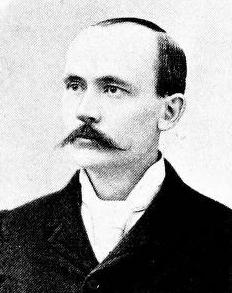

Member of the U.S. House of Representatives from New York
- In office March 4, 1907 – July 5, 1912
- Preceded by: William H. Flack
- Succeeded by: Edwin A. Merritt
- Constituency: 26th district

Personal details
- Born: George Roland Malby; September 16, 1857 Canton, St. Lawrence County, New York
- Died: July 5, 1912 (aged 54) New York City
- Resting place: Ogdensburg Cemetery
- Party: Republican

George Roland Malby (September 16, 1857 – July 5, 1912) was an American politician from New York. He was Speaker of the New York State Assembly in 1894, and served three terms in Congress as a Republican from 1907 to 1912.

== Life ==
He attended Canton Union School and St. Lawrence University. He studied law, was admitted to the bar in 1881, and commenced the practice of law in Ogdensburg, New York.

Malby was the Justice of the Peace of Oswegatchie, New York.

=== State legislature ===
He was a member of the New York State Assembly from 1891 through 1895, representing three St. Lawrence County. He was Minority Leader in 1893, and Speaker in 1894.

He was a member of the New York State Senate (32nd D.) from 1896 to 1906, sitting in the 119th through 129th New York State Legislatures.

=== Congress ===
Malby was elected as a Republican to the 60th, 61st and 62nd United States Congresses, holding office from March 4, 1907, until his death on July 5, 1913.

On December 13, 1911, Malby was the sole dissenter when the House voted 300–1 to terminate relations with Russia based on that nation's discrimination against Jews.

He was buried at Ogdensburg Cemetery in Ogdensburg, N.Y.

== See also ==
- List of members of the United States Congress who died in office (1900–1949)

New York State Assembly
Preceded by N. Martin Curtis	New York State Assembly; St. Lawrence County, 1st District; 1891–1892	Succeeded by district abolished
Preceded by new district	New York State Assembly; St. Lawrence County; 1893–1895	Succeeded by Ira C. Miles (1st D.); Martin V. B. Ives (2nd D.)
Political offices
Preceded by James W. Husted	Minority Leader in the New York State Assembly; 1893	Succeeded by William Sulzer
Preceded by William Sulzer	Speaker of the New York State Assembly; 1894	Succeeded by Hamilton Fish II
New York State Senate
Preceded by Frank W. Higgins	New York State Senate; 32nd District; 1896–1906	Succeeded by William T. O'Neil
U.S. House of Representatives
Preceded by William H. Flack	Member of the U.S. House of Representatives from New York's 26th congressional district 1907–1912	Succeeded by Edwin A. Merritt
