= John F. O'Brien (secretary of state) =

American politician (1859–1927)

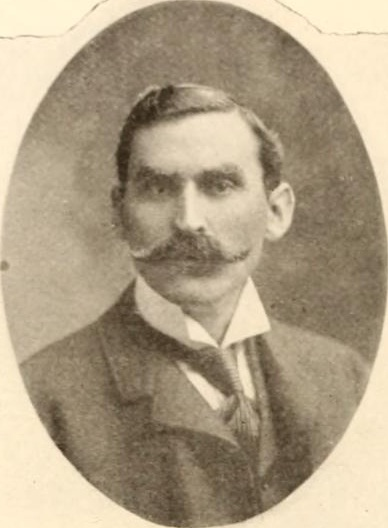
- O'Brien in 1902

Secretary of State of New York
- In office January 1, 1903 – December 31, 1906
- Preceded by: John T. McDonough
- Succeeded by: John S. Whalen

Member of the New York State Assembly from the Clinton County district
- In office January 1, 1901 – December 31, 1902
- Preceded by: Charles E. Johnson
- Succeeded by: H. Wallace Knapp

Personal details
- Born: October 9, 1859 Fort Edward, New York, U.S.
- Died: April 23, 1927 (aged 67) Plattsburgh, New York, U.S.
- Occupation: Businessman; politician

John F. O'Brien (October 9, 1859 – April 23, 1927) was an American businessman and politician. He was Secretary of State of New York from 1903 to 1906.

== Early life ==
O'Brien was born in Fort Edward, New York, on October 9, 1859, the son of James O'Brien. He attended the public schools and Fort Edward Collegiate Institute, and taught school for a year.

== Career ==
Then he entered business, and in 1888 he succeeded his brother Edward in the wholesale commission flour business at Plattsburgh. In 1897, he formed with his partner George C. Kellogg the O'Brien & Kellogg Dock and Coal Company, and acquired control of the docks and waterfront at Plattsburgh, conducting the largest wholesale business of flour, coal, feed and grain in Northern New York.

He was a member of the New York State Assembly (Clinton Co.) in 1901 and 1902. He was Secretary of State of New York from 1903 to 1906, elected at the New York state election, 1902 and the New York state election, 1904 but defeated for re-election at the New York state election, 1906.

He was an alternate delegate to the 1920 Republican National Convention, and a delegate to the 1924 Republican National Convention. He was President of the Plattsburgh National Bank and Trust Company.

== Death ==
He died on April 23, 1927, in Plattsburgh, New York.

New York State Assembly
Preceded by Charles E. Johnson	New York State Assembly; 1901–1902	Succeeded by H. Wallace Knapp
Political offices
Preceded by John T. McDonough	Secretary of State of New York; 1903–1906	Succeeded by John S. Whalen
