= 1897 New York state election =

- November 2, 1897

The 1897 New York state election was held on November 2, 1897, to elect the Chief Judge of the New York Court of Appeals, as well as all members of the New York State Assembly and one member of the New York State Senate. At the same time, the first Mayor of the consolidated City of New York was elected to take office on January 1, 1898.

== History ==
In 1897, there was only one officer to be elected statewide: the Chief Judge of the Court of Appeals, to succeed Charles Andrews whose term would expire at the end of the year because he had reached the constitutional age limit of 70 years.

The Socialist Labor state convention met on August 14 at 64, East Fourth Street in New York City, and nominated Theodore F. Cuno for Chief Judge.

The Democratic State Committee met on September 15 at the Hoffman House in New York City. Alton B. Parker was nominated for Chief Judge on the first ballot(vote: Parker 27, Charles F. Tabor 10, Charles J. Patterson 8, D. Cady Herrick 3).

The Republican State Committee met on September 18 at the Fifth Avenue Hotel in New York City. Charles W. Hackett presided. Federal Judge William J. Wallace was nominated unanimously for Chief Judge.

The nomination of Charles Frederick Adams for Chief Judge on the "United Democracy" ticket was filed shortly before midnight on October 7 at the Secretary of State's office in Albany by two Republicans. Adams declined to run, and Lawrence J. McParlin was substituted on the ticket. Elliott Danforth, the Chairman of the Democratic State Committee, contested the legality of the petition to file a ticket by the United Democracy, and the objections were heard by Secretary of State John Palmer, a Republican, on October 14. At noon on October 18, Palmer ruled that the petition complied with the Election Law. An hour later, Justice D. Cady Herrick, a Democrat, of the New York Supreme Court, issued an injunction to restrain Palmer from certifying to the county clerks that a candidate of the United Democracy had been nominated, pending a decision of the courts, and scheduling a hearing for 3 o'clock p.m. Before the hearing began, McParlin withdrew his candidature, but legal experts held that, if the United Democracy's petition was upheld, his name would appear on the ballot despite his withdrawal. Under the circumstances, Justice Herrick heard the arguments, and decided at 10.30 p.m. to reverse Palmer's decision, and the ticket did not appear on the ballots.

== Result ==
The Democratic candidate Alton B. Parker was elected, the only Democrat elected to a statewide elective state office from New York state election, 1893 to New York state election, 1900.

1897 state election result
Office	Democratic ticket		Republican ticket		Socialist Labor ticket		Prohibition ticket		National Democratic ticket
Chief Judge	Alton B. Parker	554,680	William J. Wallace	493,791	Theodore F. Cuno	20,854	Francis E. Baldwin	19,653	Alton B. Parker

Obs.: "Blank, defective and scattering" votes: 70,180.

== See also ==
- New York state elections

== Sources ==
- The tickets: ELECTIONS IN OTHER STATES in NYT on October 31, 1897
- The tickets: PARKER'S NAME APPEARS TWICE in NYT on October 23, 1897
- Result: ALTON B. PARKER'S PLURALITY in NYT on December 19, 1897
- Result: The Tribune Almanac 1898
- Result in New York County (includes Manhattan and Bronx): in NYT on November 21, 1897
