= Wiltwyck Rural Cemetery =

Cemetery in Kingston, New York, U.S.

- Interactive map of Wiltwyck Rural Cemetery

Details
- Established: 1857
- Location: 145 Pine Grove Ave. Kingston, NY 12401
- Country: United States
- Coordinates: 41.9226°N 74.0049°W
- Owned by: Wiltwyck Rural Cemetery Association
- Size: 85 acres (34 ha)
- Website: www.wiltwyckcemetery.org
- Find a Grave: Wiltwyck Rural Cemetery
- The Political Graveyard: Wiltwyck Rural Cemetery

Wiltwyck Rural Cemetery, also known simply as Wiltwyck Cemetery, is a cemetery in Kingston, New York. It takes its name from the Dutch settlement Wiltwyck, later renamed Kingston by British officials. Wiltwyck Cemetery was first organized in 1850, and reorganized in 1856.

== Background ==
Some notable figures interred in Wiltwyck Cemetery include the Neoclassicist painter, John Vanderlyn, World War II Congressional Medal of Honor winner Robert H. Dietz, and the 1904 Democratic Presidential nominee, Alton Brooks Parker.
