= Samuel Seabury (disambiguation) =

Samuel Seabury (1729–1796) was the first American Episcopal bishop and the Episcopal Church's second presiding bishop.

Samuel Seabury may also refer to:

- Samuel Seabury (1801–1872), rector of the Church of the Annunciation in New York City
- Samuel Seabury (judge) (1873–1958), judge of the New York Court of Appeals
