= Lewis H. Pounds =

American politician (1860–1947)

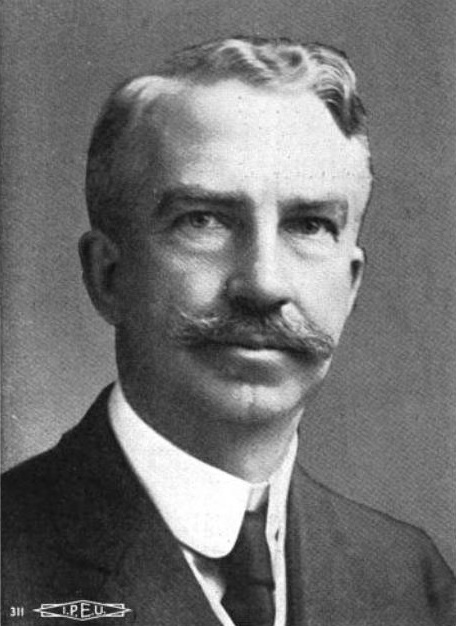
- Pounds, c. 1922

6th Borough President of Brooklyn
- In office January 1, 1914 – December 31, 1917
- Preceded by: Alfred E. Steers
- Succeeded by: Edward J. Riegelmann

Personal details
- Born: April 9, 1860 Eaton Estates, Ohio, U.S.
- Died: December 16, 1947 (aged 87) Brooklyn, New York City, U.S.
- Party: Republican
- Spouse: Carrie Stilson (died 1940)
- Education: Oberlin College; Boston University

Lewis Humphrey Pounds (April 9, 1860 in Eaton, Lorain County, Ohio – December 16, 1947 in Brooklyn, New York) was an American businessman and politician.

== Life ==
He graduated from Oberlin College and Boston University. About 1893 he moved to Brooklyn, New York where he became a real estate broker and developer. He married Carrie Stilson (d. 1940).

He was Brooklyn Commissioner of Public Works when he was elected Borough President of Brooklyn on July 3, 1913. He stayed in office until 1917, the only Republican Borough President of Brooklyn in history. On April 30, 1921, he was appointed one of the original six commissioners of the Port of New York Authority, and later became its president.

He was the last New York State Treasurer, elected in 1924 defeating the incumbent Democrat George K. Shuler. Governor Al Smith undertook a major re-organisation of the State government during his four terms in office, and the State Treasury was merged on January 1, 1927, into the Department of Audit and Control headed by the New York State Comptroller.

In 1932, after the resignation of Jimmy Walker, Pounds ran for Mayor of New York City, but was defeated by Democrat John P. O'Brien.

He was a delegate to the 1908, 1936 and 1940 Republican National Conventions.

He died at his home at 317, East Seventeenth Street, in Brooklyn, and was buried at the Northport Rural Cemetery in Northport, New York.

== Sources ==
- Political Graveyard
- Elected Borough Pres., in NYT on July 4, 1913
- Appointed port commissioner, in NYT on May 1, 1921
- Pres of Port Authority, in NYT on June 17, 1922

Party political offices
Preceded by N. Monroe Marshall	Republican nominee for New York State Treasurer; 1924	Succeeded by None
Political offices
Preceded by Alfred E. Steers	Borough President of Brooklyn; 1914–1917	Succeeded by Edward J. Riegelmann
Preceded by George K. Shuler	New York State Treasurer; 1925–1926	Succeeded by Morris S. Tremaine as New York State Comptroller
