= Alfred E. Steers =

American magistrate and politician

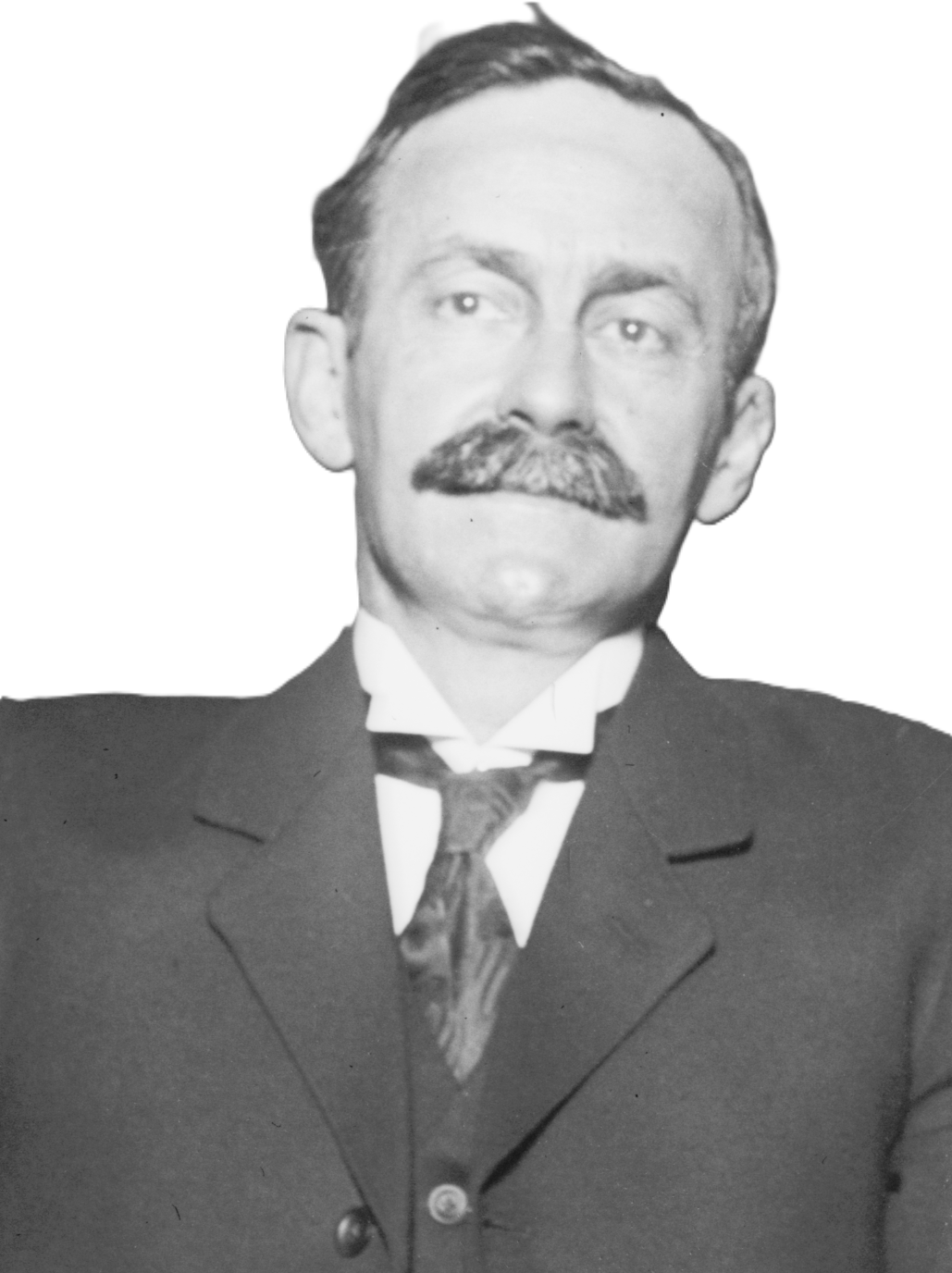
- Steers in 1911
- Born: March 26, 1860
- Died: March 2, 1948 (aged 87)
- Military career
- Allegiance: United States
- Branch: Infantry
- Conflicts: Spanish-American War
- Other work: Politician

Alfred E. Steers (March 26, 1860 – March 2, 1948) was an American politician and magistrate from New York.

== Life ==
Steers was born on March 26, 1860, in Brooklyn, the son of grocer Christopher Steers. After finishing school, he entered the grocery business in Flatbush and opened a broom factory in Manhattan. When his father, brother, and uncle died in a short period of time and left him a significant amount of property, he entered the real estate business.

In 1891, Steers was appointed justice of the peace for Flatbush to fill a vacancy. He was elected to the office a year later and served until Flatbush was annexed into Brooklyn. In 1894, he was appointed a police justice. In 1899, upon the consolidation of Greater New York, he was appointed a city magistrate.

Steers served in the New York National Guard for many years. During the Spanish-American War, he was a captain in the 14th Regiment. During World War I, at the age of 57, he volunteered for service and was sent to Albany as a recruiting officer. He retired in 1924 as a lieutenant colonel.

When Steers wasn't reappointed to the bench in 1909, he ran for Borough president of Brooklyn. A staunch Democrat, he ran under an Independent-Democrat-Republican-Fusion ticket and won the election. He took office the next year. At the end of his term, he was made again appointed city magistrate. He never held a law degree or passed the bar, but he diligently read law since he became justice of the peace and was ranked highly on the bench. He retired in 1933.

In 1884, Steers married Laura G. Kleinfelder. His children were Alfred E. Jr. and Mrs. Mildred Roehle. He was a member of the Freemasons, the Municipal Club, the Knickerbocker Club, and the Cortelyou Club. He was also a director of the Flatbush Boys Club, the Brooklyn Orphan Asylum, the Home for Destitute Children, and the Flatbush Chamber of Commerce. He served as president of the Flatbush Volunteer Fire Department from 1888 to 1890. He was an elder of the Old Flatbush Dutch Reformed Church.

Steers died at home on March 2, 1948. He was buried in Green-Wood Cemetery.

Political offices
Preceded by Bird S. Coler	Borough president of Brooklyn; 1910–1913	Succeeded by Lewis H. Pounds
