= Almet Francis Jenks =

American judge (1853–1924)

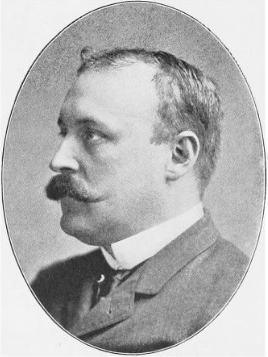

Justice of the New York Supreme Court

Personal details
- Born: May 21, 1853 Brooklyn, New York, US
- Died: September 18, 1924 (aged 71) Greenwich, Connecticut, US
- Party: Democratic
- Education: Yale University; Columbia University
- Occupation: Lawyer, politician

Almet Francis Jenks (May 21, 1853 – September 18, 1924) was an American lawyer and judge from New York. He was a justice of the New York Supreme Court.

== Early life ==
Jenks was born in Brooklyn, New York on May 21, 1853. His father was Grenville T. Jenks, a lawyer. His great-grandfather was John Phililips, the first mayor of Boston.

He graduated from Yale University in 1875. While at Yale, he was a member of Skull and Bones and was the editor of the Yale Literary Magazine. He earned a Bachelor of Laws from Columbia University in 1877.

== Career ==
Jenks was a junior member of the Ward & Jenks law firm from 1878 to 1884. In 1884, he became the assistant district attorney of Kings County, New York. From 1886 to 1894, he was the corporate counsel of Brookyn.

From 1891 to 1895, Jenks was the judge advocate general of New York State under Governor David B. Hill. He was a member of the judiciary committee of the New York Constitutional Convention in 1894. He became the assistant corporation counsel for New York City in 1898, resigning after winning an election to the New York Supreme Court. He was sworn into the court on January 1, 1899.

In 1901, Governor Theodore Roosevelt appointed Jenks to the appellate courty. Jenks was a justice of the New York Supreme Court, Appellate Division, Second Department from 1901 to 1911, being reappointed in 1905 and 1911. He became to court's presiding justice in 1911, serving in that capacity until he retired in April 1921. In 1916, he ran on the Democratic and Independence League tickets for Chief Judge of the New York Court of Appeals but was defeated by Republican/Progressive Frank H. Hiscock.

In April 1921, Jenks returned to private practice as a senior partner along with Gustavus A. Rogers in Jenks & Rogers, citing the low pay for justices as his reason for leaving the bench. Jenks & Rogers represented the National Association of the Motion Picture Industry in censorship letigation. Jenks lectured on professional ethics at St. Lawrence University from 1921 to 1922.

== Personal life ==
In 1891, Jenks married to Lena Barre. The couple had two children, author Almet Francis Jenks Jr and Ruth Jenks.

Jenks was president of the Yale Alumni Association of Long Island from 1915 to 1921. He was a member of the Brooklyn and Hamilton Club and the Society of Colonial Wars.

Jenks died at Kent House hotel in Greenwich, Connecticut on September 18, 1924 at the age of 71.
