= Thomas B. Lockwood =

American lawyer

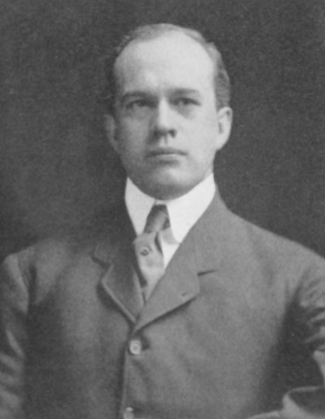
- Born: Thomas Brown Lockwood; February 7, 1873; Buffalo, New York, US
- Died: August 19, 1947 (aged 74); Buffalo, New York
- Burial place: Forest Lawn Cemetery, Buffalo
- Education: Buffalo Normal School; Yale University; Cornell University Law School
- Occupations: Lawyer, banker, politician
- Political party: Democratic
- Spouses: Marion Doon Lobdell (m. 1899; died 1900) Marion Birge (m. 1904; died 1932) Mildred McGuire (m. 1934)

Thomas Brown Lockwood (February 7, 1873 – August 19, 1947) was an American lawyer, banker, politician, and philanthropist from Western New York.

== Early life ==
Lockwood was born in Buffalo, New York on February 7, 1873 and grew up in his parents' mansion on Niagara Street in Buffalo. He was the son of attorney and U.S. Representative Daniel N. Lockwood, and the former Sarah Brown (1847–1898), daughter of Thomas Brown. In Chicago in 1884, his father had nominated his close friend Grover Cleveland for President who appointed him the United States Attorney for the Northern District of New York upon his election. His sister, Elizabeth Lockwood, was the wife of Bronson C. Rumsey.

He was educated at the Buffalo Normal School, before entering Yale University in 1891 where he graduated with the class of 1895, and was a member of Delta Kappa Epsilon and Phi Delta Phi. After he returned to Buffalo, he read law with Rogers, Locke & Milburn, before attending Cornell University Law School before being admitted to the bar in 1897.

== Career ==
After being admitted to the bar, he became a member of the firm of Lockwood, Hoyt & Greene, of which his father was the senior member. After his father's death in 1906, the firm dissolved and he became a solo practitioner with an office at 77 West Eagle Street in Buffalo. He was a trustee of the Erie County Savings Bank, a director of the Third National Bank, and a director of the Federal Telephone Company.

=== Political career ===
In 1906, he was appointed by Buffalo Mayor James N. Adam, a member of the board of park commissioners, serving until 1916; he was president of the board in 1911. In 1910 he was appointed secretary of the Municipal Tuberculosis Commission of Buffalo, created by an act of the State Legislature. In 1911, he resigned as secretary when Mayor Louis P. Fuhrmann appointed him a member of the Small Parks Commission.

In 1912, he became the chairman of the campaign committee of the Erie County Democratic organization. A follower of Woodrow Wilson, Lockwood unsuccessfully sought the Democratic nomination for governor of New York, losing to U.S. Representative William Sulzer who was elected governor.

Lockwood "favor[ed] the enactment of a just and fair workmen's compensation act, the speedy completion of the barge canal and terminals, extension of good roads to all parts of the State, curtailment of State expenses, a systematic movement to check the spread of tuberculosis, the enactment of a system of credits for farmers, self-government for cities, and conservation of the natural resources of the State."

In the 1914 New York state election, he beat William Gorham Rice in the Democratic primary to secure the Lieutenant Governor nomination under sitting Governor Martin H. Glynn, the first Irish American Roman Catholic governor of New York. Both Lockwood and Glynn lost in the general election to Republicans Edward Schoeneck and Charles S. Whitman, respectively.

== Personal life ==
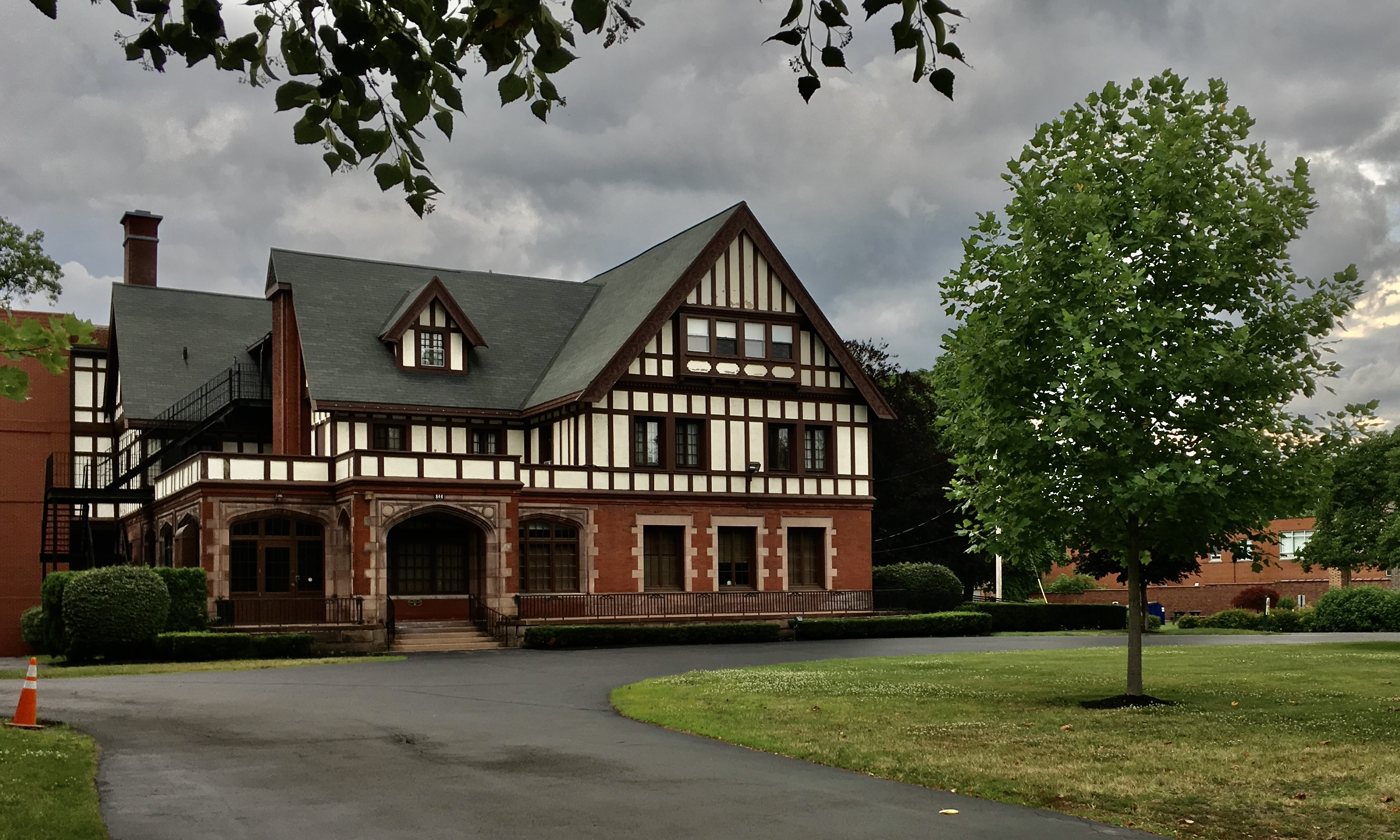
The Lockwood House on Delaware Avenue

Lookwood was married three times throughout his life. His first marriage was in 1899 to Marion Doon Lobdell (1877–1900), a daughter of the Dr. Francis Lobdell, rector of Trinity Episcopal Church in Buffalo. She died at her mother's home on Ashland Avenue on June 3, 1900, and her funeral was held at the family home at 465 Niagara Street.

On November 1, 1904, who married Marion Birge (1881–1932), a daughter of Carrie (née Humphrey) Birge and George K. Birge, founder and president of the Pierce-Arrow Motor Car Company, at the home of her parents. Her sister, Allithea Birge Cary was the wife of architect George Cary. In 1918, Lockwood bought and remodeled 844 Delaware Avenue, which had been built in 1888 and, today, is a contributing property to the Delaware Avenue Historic District. After the death of his wife in 1932, he married Mildred (née Frances) McGuire, a daughter of Thomas Francis, on November 20, 1934, who survived him.

In Buffalo, he was a member of the Saturn Club, the Buffalo Club, the University Club, the Country Club of Buffalo and the Park Country Club. He was also a member of the University Club of New York City.

After a four-year illness, Lockwood died in Buffalo on August 19, 1947. He was buried at the Forest Lawn Cemetery, Buffalo. His widow sold their house for $52,000 to the Catholic Diocese of Buffalo in 1950.

=== Philanthropy ===
In 1935, he gifted his collection of rare books, manuscripts and autographs valued at $500,000 to the University of Buffalo. At the time, it was said that "only Harvard, Yale and the University of Michigan would own more comprehensive collections of first editions and other rare books." He also donated funds for the construction of a four-story library which was built in the spring of 1935 and designed in the Georgian style by Buffalo architect Edward Brodhead Green and was named after him as the Lockwood Memorial Library.

Party political offices
Preceded by Martin H. Glynn	Democratic nominee for Lieutenant Governor of New York; 1914	Succeeded by Thomas J. Kreuzer
