= Gustave Adolph Strebel =

American politician (1875–1945)

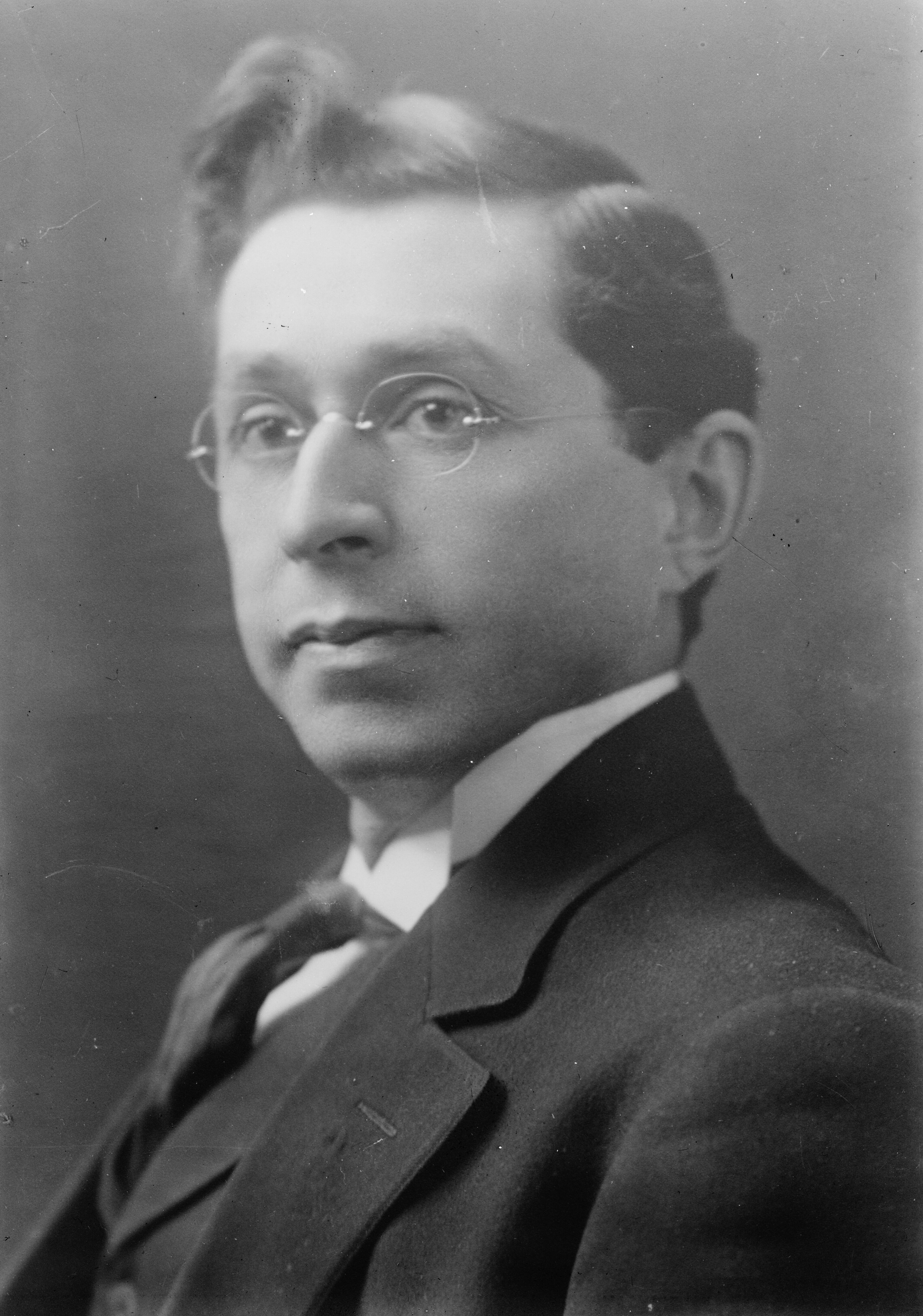
- Strebel c. 1910–1915
- Born: November 11, 1875; Syracuse, New York, U.S.
- Died: November 27, 1945 (aged 70); Syracuse, New York, U.S.
- Political party: Socialist

Gustave Adolph Strebel (November 11, 1875 – November 27, 1945) was president of the New York State Congress of Industrial Organizations. He was the Socialist Party of America candidate for Governor of New York in the New York state election of 1914.

== Biography ==
Strebel was born on November 11, 1875, in Syracuse, New York. He was the Socialist Party of America candidate for Governor of New York in the New York state election of 1914. He died on November 27, 1945, at St. Joseph's Hospital in Syracuse, New York.
