= Vladimir Karapetoff =

American electrical engineer (1876–1948)

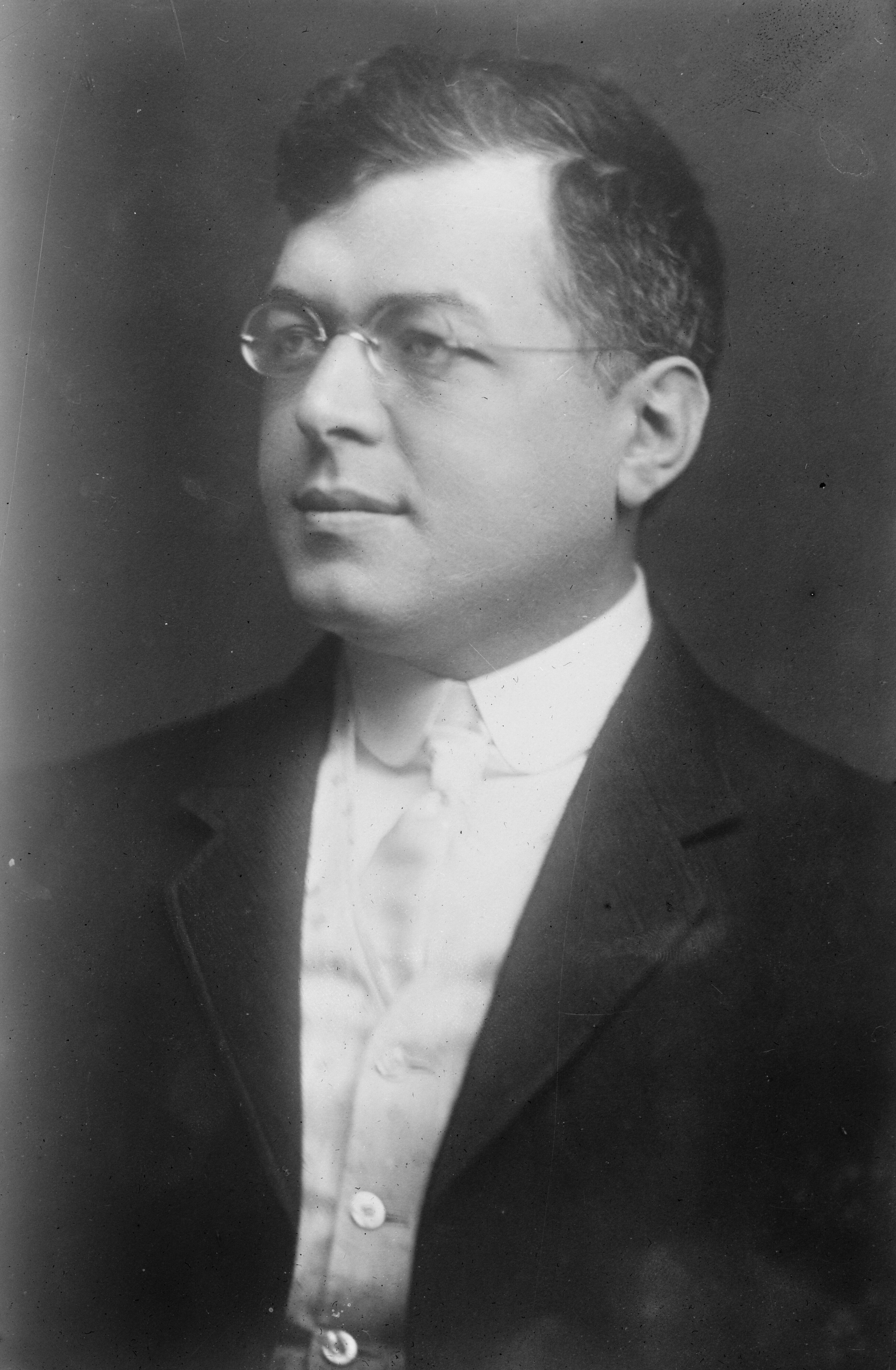
Karapetoff c. 1900s–1910s

Vladimir Karapetoff (January 8, 1876 – January 11, 1948) was a Russian-American electrical engineer, inventor, professor, and author.

== Life ==
Karapetoff was born in Saint Petersburg, Russian Empire in 1876. He was the son of Nikita Ivanovich Karapetov and Anna Joakimovna Karapetova. Karapetoff first studied at Petersburg State University of Means of Communication taking his first certification in 1897 and a second in 1902. During his studies he was a consultant to the Russian government and served as an instructor teaching electrical engineering and hydraulics in three of Saint Petersburg's colleges.

In 1899, he went to the Technische Hochschule Darmstadt to study power systems, he wrote Über Mehrphasige Stromsysteme in 1900.

In 1902, Karapetoff emigrated to the United States and apprenticed at Westinghouse Electric and Manufacturing Company. The following year he began his long association with Cornell University as professor of electrical engineering.

Karapetoff published the first part of his Engineering Applications of Higher Mathematics in 1911, and followed with parts two to five in 1916. That year he also published Electrical Measurements and Testing, Direct and Alternating Current.

The American Institute of Electrical Engineers made him a Fellow in 1912. He became a charter member of the American Association of University Professors in 1915. Karapetoff was a research editor for Electrical World from 1917 to 1926.

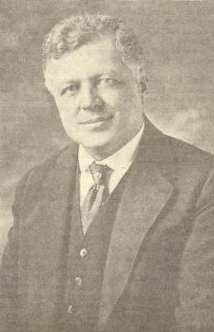
Karapetoff c. 1924

As a member of the Socialist Party of America, Karapetoff ran for the New York State Senate in 1910; and for New York State Engineer and Surveyor in the State elections of 1914, 1920 and 1924.

Karapetoff wrote several articles on special relativity to show that

much of the difficulty in understanding the subject lies in the popular effort to reconcile relativity with our every-day experience. Once this non-technical point of view, with its childish illustrations and analogs, has been abandoned, and the relativity space is considered mathematically per se, the treatment is not different from any other branch of mathematics. Certain postulates are made and a structure is built step by step on these, using mathematical logic and its recognized tools and operations.

In the first three articles in the journal of the Optical Society of America (1924-1929), Karapetoff used the notion of a "velocity angle" α which expressed the relation of a velocity v to the speed of light by sin α = v/c (an equivalent definition was used before in 1921 by Paul Gruner while developing symmetric Minkowski diagrams). In the later articles he used instead the hyperbolic angle u called rapidity in relativity, and determined by tanh u = v/c. As explained in a footnote on page 73 of the 1936 article, when sin α = tanh u, one says that α is the Gudermannian angle of u, and u is the anti-Gudermannian of α. Thus he explains, "the present treatment is in terms of the anti-Gudermannian of the velocity angle previously used." The diagrammatic treatments given by Karapetoff are frequently called Minkowski diagrams in physical science.

In 1930 he gave the first published statement of the Aufbau principle that describes the electron configurations of atoms (although Erwin Madelung had discovered it in 1926, Madelung did not publish until 1936).

In 1928 the Franklin Institute awarded him the Elliott Cresson Medal. Karapetoff was an accomplished cellist, and in 1934 was awarded an honorary doctorate in music by the New York College of Music. On November 25, 1936, he married Rosalie Margaret Cobb at Dobbs Ferry, New York. The Brooklyn Polytechnic Institute bestowed on him the degree of Doctor of Science in 1937. Karapetoff died in 1948, and is buried in Ithaca, Tompkins County, New York.

In his honor, since 1992 Eta Kappa Nu has celebrated significant work of electrical engineers with the Vladimir Karapetoff Outstanding Technical Achievement Award.

== Articles ==
- 1924: "Aberration of light in terms of the theory of relativity as illustrated on a cone and a pyramid", Journal of the Optical Society of America 9(3):223–33.
- 1926: "Straight-line relativity in oblique coordinates; also illustrated by a mechanical model", Journal of the Optical Society of America 13:155.
- 1929: "Relativity transformation of an oscillation into a travelling wave, and DeBroglie's postulate in terms of velocity angle", Journal of the Optical Society of America 19:253.
- 1936: "Restricted relativity in terms of hyperbolic functions of rapidities", American Mathematical Monthly 43:70–82.
- 1939: "The mathematical thread in my life", Scripta Mathematica, 8:63–67.
- 1941: "A general outline of restricted relativity", Scripta Mathematica 8:145–63.
- 1944: "The special theory of relativity in hyperbolic functions", Reviews of Modern Physics 16:33–52, Abstract, link to pdf
- 1945: "The constancy of the velocity of light", in A Collection of Papers in Memory of Sir William Rowan Hamiltion, Scripta Mathematica at Yeshiva College.
