= James L. Wells =

American politician (1843–1928)

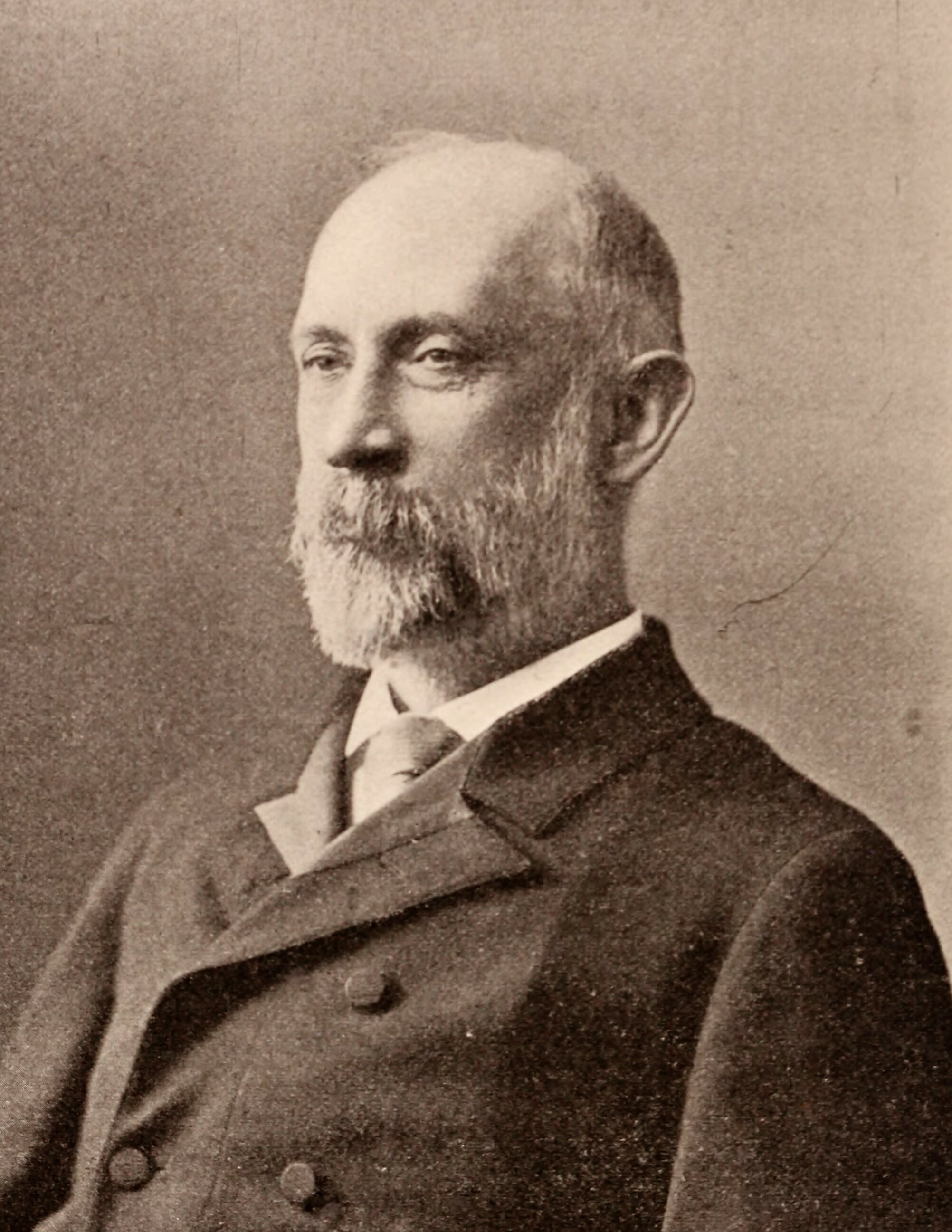
The Hon. James L. Wells, President of the North Side Board of Trade

James Lee Wells (December 16, 1843 – September 5, 1928) was an American businessman and politician. He became known as Father of The Bronx, a title which was officially conferred on him by the Bronx Board of Trade in May 1921.

== Life ==
James L. Wells was born in West Farms, which was then a town in Westchester County, on December 16, 1843. In 1874, West Farms was part of the Bronx District which was annexed by New York County and became the 23rd and 24th Wards. Since 1898, West Farms is a neighborhood in the Borough of The Bronx in New York City.

He graduated from Columbia College in 1865, and became a real estate broker and auctioneer.

He was a member of the New York State Assembly in 1879 (Westchester Co., 1st D.) and 1880 (New York Co., 24th D.). He was a member of the Board of Aldermen of New York City from 1881 to 1883.

He was again a member of the State Assembly (New York Co., 24th D.) in 1892. In June 1895, he was appointed by Mayor William L. Strong a Commissioner of Taxes and Assessments to fill the unexpired term of John Whalen until 1899. Mayor Seth Low appointed him president of the Tax Commission.

He was the Republican and Citizens Union candidate for borough president of The Bronx in 1901, but was defeated. He was a delegate to the 1912, 1920 and 1924 Republican National Conventions.

He was New York State Treasurer from 1915 to 1920, elected at the New York state election, 1914, and re-elected at the New York state election, 1916, and the New York state election, 1918.

He was president of the North Side Board of Trade, a director of the Twenty-third Ward Bank, a trustee of the Dollar Savings Bank, and president of the Real Estate Auctioneers' Association of New York City.

His daughter Edith Wells married Rev. Charles C. Harriman, Rector of St. Ann's Church in The Bronx, in 1908, and died three years later aged 23.

He died at his home at 277 Alexander Avenue, in the Bronx on September 5, 1928.

Party political offices
Preceded by William Archer	Republican nominee for New York State Treasurer; 1914, 1916, 1918	Succeeded by N. Monroe Marshall
New York State Assembly
Preceded by William F. Moller	New York State Assembly; Westchester County, 1st District; 1879	Succeeded by David O. Bradley
Preceded by District eliminated	New York State Assembly; New York County, 24th District; 1880	Succeeded by William W. Niles
Preceded by Christopher C. Clarke	New York State Assembly; New York County, 24th District; 1892	Succeeded by Frederick P. Hummel
Political offices
Preceded by Homer D. Call	New York State Treasurer; 1915–20	Succeeded by N. Monroe Marshall
