= John T. Norton =

American politician

John Thomas Norton (February 4, 1865 – April 16, 1942) was an American lawyer and politician from New York.

== Life ==
Norton was born on February 4, 1865, in Troy, New York, son of Thomas Norton, superintendent of Clinton Iron Works and city alderman, and Rose Shattuck. His parents were both Irish immigrants; Thomas came from County Tipperary, Rose from Belfast. His orphaned first cousin Mary Theresa Norton was also raised with him and her son, James T. Lee, was also the maternal grandfather of Jacqueline Kennedy Onassis, First Lady of the United States from 1960 to 1963.

Norton graduated from Troy High School in 1882. He then entered Williams College, graduating from there in 1886. After graduating, he began to study law in the law office of Smith, Fursman & Cowen. In January 1888, he moved to Buffalo and worked as a managing clerk for Wadsworth & Loveridge. In October that year, he was admitted to the bar in Rochester and returned to Troy. He then entered a partnership with M. H. Myers in 1889. After Myers' death, he practiced law on his own. He was the village attorney for Greenbush.

In 1894, Norton was elected to the New York State Assembly as a Democrat, representing Rensselaer County 1st District. He served in the Assembly in 1895 and 1896. In the 1900 New York state election, he was the Democratic candidate for Secretary of State of New York. He lost the election to John T. McDonough.

Norton served as corporation counsel of Troy from 1902 to 1904. In 1905, he unsuccessfully ran for district attorney as an independent Democrat. From 1911 to 1914, he served as deputy Attorney General of New York and was in charge of the Conservation Bureau of the Attorney General's office. He was New York governor Martin H. Glynn's legal advisor. In the 1916 New York state election, he was the Democratic candidate for Judge of the Court of Appeals.

In 1931, then-New York governor Franklin D. Roosevelt appointed Norton special prosecutor in the assault case of Legs Diamond. Diamond was acquitted, but was found shot the next day.

In 1891, Norton married Margaret Hammond. Their children were Josephine, Margaret, Thomas John, and Helen Norton Roff. He was a member of the New York State Bar Association. He served as president of the Rockwood Manufacturing Company of Fulton County and the Forbes Manor Realty Company of Rensselaer. He was a Catholic.

Norton died at home on April 16, 1942. He was buried in St. Mary's Cemetery.

New York State Assembly
Preceded by William M. Keenan	New York State Assembly; Rensselaer County, 1st District; 1895	Succeeded by Edward McGraw
Preceded by John M. Chambers (New York politician)	New York State Assembly; Rensselaer County, 2nd District; 1896	Succeeded by William Hutton, Jr.
