= American Party (1914) =

Minor United States political party formed in 1914

The American Party was a short-lived minor political party during the early 20th century. It was "formed by a number of disgruntled Democrats and admirers of William Sulzer". The party was incorporated on April 13, 1914, at Albany.

== Background ==
Sulzer had been a long-time Democratic U.S. Representative, and was elected Governor of New York in 1912. He was impeached when rebelling against the domination by Tammany boss Charles Francis Murphy, and was removed from office in October 1913. In November 1913, he was elected on the Progressive ticket to a seat in the New York State Assembly (6th District), but he thought it was necessary to have an own party to run at the next state election in 1914 with the aim to defeat Martin H. Glynn, his Lieutenant Governor who had succeeded to the governorship and whom Sulzer considered a back-stabber.

== Electoral history ==
At the 1914 New York state election, the party ran only Sulzer as candidate for Governor, and adopted the Liberty Bell as symbol on the ballot. Since the party didn't have automatic ballot access, they were required to gather signatures and file petitions for all candidates, which they did for Sulzer but did not bother about for their other candidates which the American Party Executive Committee endorsed. Nevertheless, these candidates could be voted for: the candidates of other parties which were endorsed by the "Americans" could be voted for at their name printed on the ballot, and any candidate's name could be written in the "no-party" column and x-ed there. Sulzer received 70,655 votes for Governor on the American ticket which gave the party automatic ballot access for the next election.

On July 22, 1916, attending a meeting of the American Federation of Patriotic Societies at Minneapolis, Sulzer stated that he would accept the American Party's nomination for U.S. President at the national convention due to open on July 25. The Convention nominated Sulzer for President and I. G. Pollard, of Indiana, for U.S. Vice President.

At the 1916 New York state election, the party ran a full ticket, but in the primary less than 80 votes were cast. The incumbent Republican Governor Charles S. Whitman disputed the nomination with his Democratic challenger Samuel Seabury. Whitman won by a single vote: 38 to 37. Robert Bacon, who lost the Republican nomination for U.S. Senator from New York, won the American nomination defeating the Democratic candidate William F. McCombs, also by a single vote: 23 to 22. Bacon tried to withdraw, but could not. According to the election law, any candidate who won nomination, had to go on the ballot. However he urged his friends to vote for Republican William M. Calder. Also nominated were Democrats Thomas J. Kreuzer for Lieutenant Governor, and William W. Farley for Attorney General; and Eugene M. Lane for Treasurer and Ephraim H. Keyes for State Engineer. In the election, Whitman received only 2,265 votes on the American ticket, which made the party lose the automatic ballot access. After this fiasco, the party disbanded.

In 1917, Sulzer made campaign speeches for John Purroy Mitchel and received $5,000 in cash as compensation. He also offered to add the American Party to Mitchel's Fusion, and campaign in the party's name which was however turned down by Mitchel's campaign manager Josiah T. Newcomb.
