= George K. Shuler =

American war hero and politician

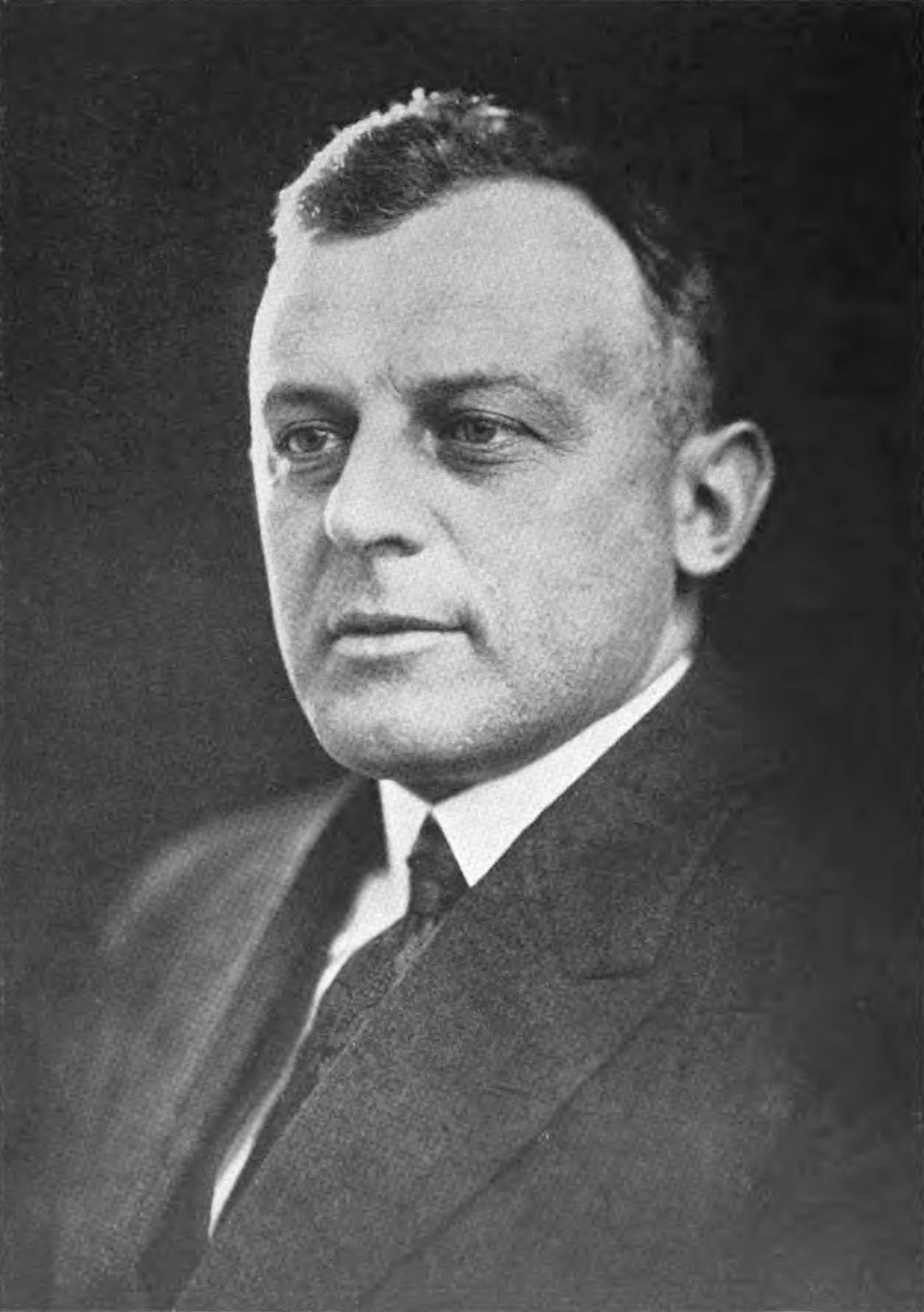
- Shuler in 1923

New York State Treasurer
- In office January 1, 1923 – December 31, 1924
- Preceded by: N. Monroe Marshall
- Succeeded by: Lewis H. Pounds

Personal details
- Born: December 15, 1884 Lyons, New York, US
- Died: October 16, 1942 (aged 57) The Bronx, New York, US
- Resting place: Long Island National Cemetery, East Farmingdale, New York, US
- Party: Democratic
- Spouse: Blanche Stewart
- Children: 2

Military service
- Allegiance: United States
- Branch: United States Marine Corps
- Years of service: 1910–1922
- Rank: Major
- Commands: 3rd Battalion, 6th Marine Regiment
- Battles/wars: Battle of Veracruz (1914); World War I
- Awards: Navy Distinguished Service Medal; Army Distinguished Service Medal; Silver Star (3)

George Kent Shuler (December 15, 1884 – October 16, 1942) was an American war hero and politician.

== Early life ==
Shuler was born in Lyons, New York. He graduated from Lyons High School in 1902. Shuler then went to Chicago, Illinois, where he worked in the union stock yards for three years. For the next two years, he worked in Los Angeles, California and at mining camps in Nevada and Death Valley.

Returning to the east coast in one of the first cross-country automobile trips, Shuler worked in a surveying party on the New York State barge canal from November 1907 to April 1909. He then went to Washington, D.C., where he got a job as a reporter for The Washington Post.

== Military career ==
While working for The Post, Shuler took courses at Dowd's Army and Navy Academy. He passed the examination for second lieutenant in the United States Marine Corps and was commissioned in October 1910. In 1914, he participated in the occupation of Veracruz, Mexico. Shuler was promoted to first lieutenant in June 1916 and then to captain in August 1916.

During World War I, Shuler went to France in the first American troop convoy as a Marine company commander in June 1917. In 1918, he received a temporary promotion to major and assumed command of the 3rd Battalion, 6th Marines. Shuler was nominated for the Distinguished Service Cross three times, but each time received the Silver Star for his combat valor instead. After the armistice, he served as part of the army of occupation in Germany from December 1918 to April 1919.

Shuler was awarded both the Army Distinguished Service Medal and the Navy Distinguished Service Medal for his wartime service. He also received the Legion of Honour and the Croix de Guerre with three palms from France.

After the war, Shuler reverted to the rank of captain. He was later permanently advanced to the rank of major. On July 30, 1922, while still a captain, Shuler commanded the detachment of four or five Marines that was dispatched by Secretary of the Interior Albert Fall to evict a drilling rig crew belonging to the Mutual Oil Company from the Teapot Dome oil field in Natrona County, Wyoming, thus precipitating one of the most notable scandals of the administration of President Warren G. Harding. The eviction proceeded without incident; the officials of the company even provided lunch to Captain Shuler and the men of his detachment after drilling operations had ceased.

== Political career ==
Shuler ran for Congress in New York's 36th congressional district in 1920. He was New York State Treasurer from 1923 to 1924, elected in 1922. He was a delegate to the 1924 Democratic National Convention.

== Personal life ==
Shuler married Blanche Stewart, and they had two daughters. In later life, he lived in Brooklyn, New York City.

Shuler died at the Veterans Hospital in the Bronx on October 16, 1942. He was interred at Long Island National Cemetery.

== See also ==
- Political Graveyard
- List of recipients, at Home of the Heroes
- His candidacy for Lt. Gov announced, mentioning his war heroism, in NYT on September 25, 1922
- The Dem. ticket, in NYT on September 30, 1922

Party political offices
Preceded by John F. Healy	Democratic nominee for New York State Treasurer; 1922, 1924	Succeeded by None
Political offices
Preceded by N. Monroe Marshall	New York State Treasurer; 1923–1924	Succeeded by Lewis H. Pounds
