= Frederick P. Hummel =

American lawyer and politician (1856–1915)

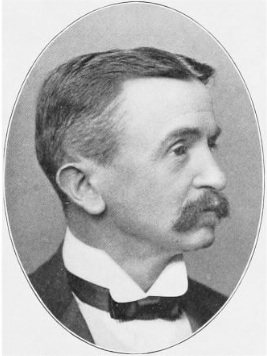

Member of the New York State Assembly
- In office 1893
- Constituency: New York County 24th District

Personal details
- Born: Frederick Philip Hummel; March 12, 1856 New York, New York, US
- Died: October 15, 1915 (aged 59) New York, New York, US
- Resting place: Woodlawn Cemetery
- Party: Democratic
- Spouse: Katie Goldsmith (m. 1885)
- Children: 3
- Education: NYU School of Law
- Occupation: Lawyer, politician

Frederick Philip Hummel (March 12, 1856 – October 15, 1915) was a lawyer and politician from New York City.

== Life ==
Hummel was born on March 12, 1856, in New York City, New York, the son of German immigrants Philip Hummel and Sophie Merx.

Hummel attended public schools. He worked as a law clerk from 1869 to 1879. He began attending the New York University School of Law in 1878 and graduated from there with an LL.B. in 1879. He was then admitted to the bar and began practicing law in New York City. In 1892, he was elected to the New York State Assembly as a Democrat, representing the New York County 24th District. He served in the Assembly in 1893. While in the Assembly, he introduced a bill to punish people for obtaining property under false pretenses. He became active in real estate developments in Yorkville in 1890. By the time he died, he was a member of the law firm Hummel & Holbert.

In 1885, Hummel married Katie Goldsmith. They had three daughters.

Hummel died at home in Marble Hill on October 15, 1915. He was buried in Woodlawn Cemetery.

New York State Assembly
Preceded by James L. Wells	New York State Assembly; New York County, 24th District; 1893	Succeeded by Robert V. Stadtfeld
