= 1916 New York state election =

1916 New York gubernatorial election
- November 7, 1916
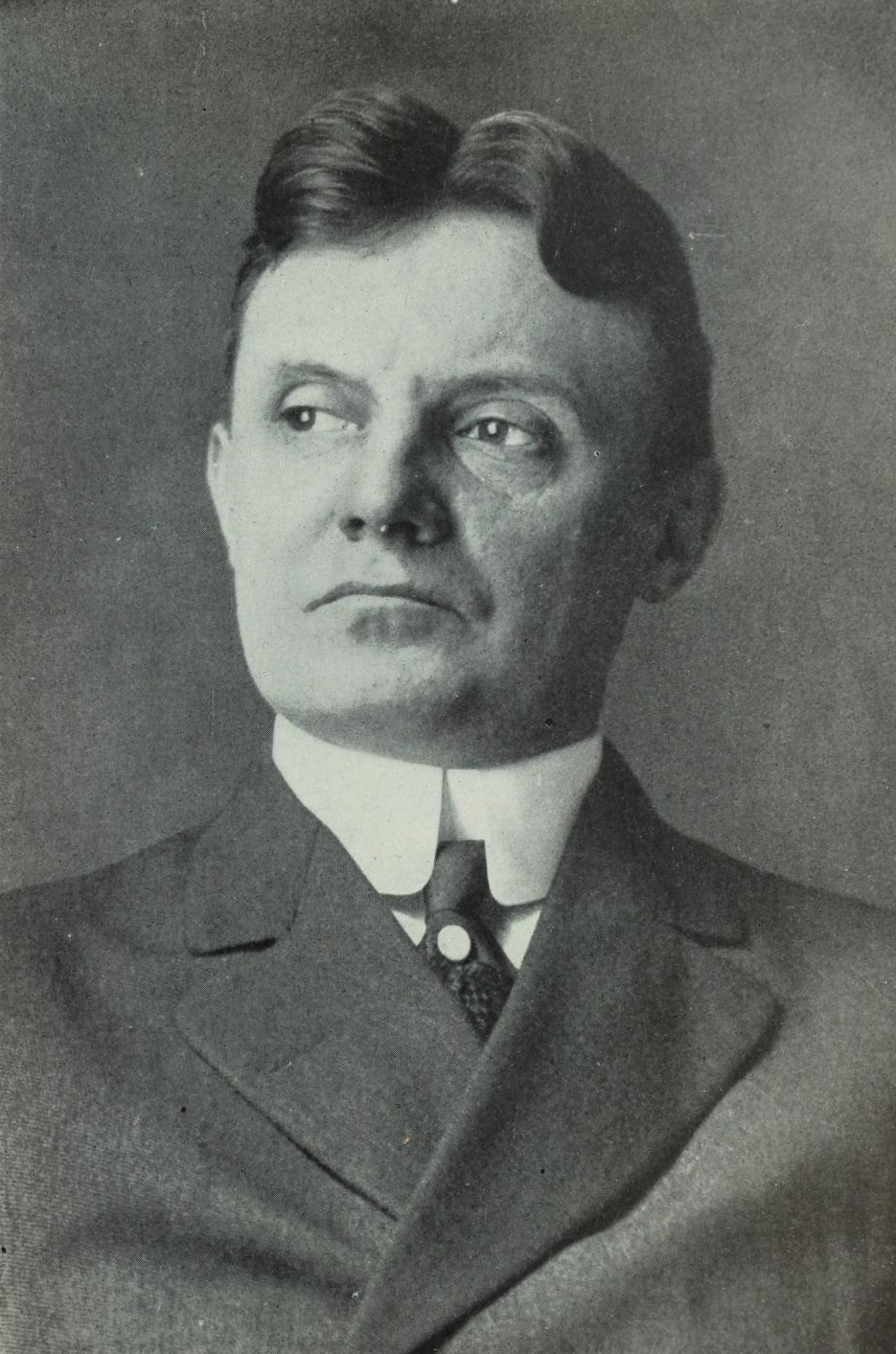

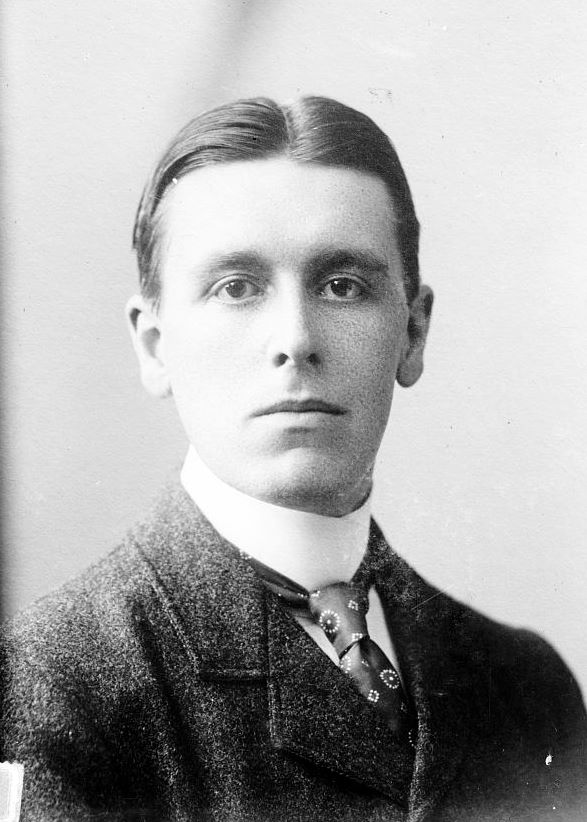
Nominee	Charles S. Whitman	Samuel Seabury
Party	Republican	Democratic
Alliance	American; Independence; Progressive
Popular vote	850,020	686,862
Percentage	52.31%	42.27%
- County results Whitman: 50–60% 60–70% Seabury: 50–60%
Governor before election
Charles S. Whitman
Republican
Elected Governor
Charles S. Whitman
Republican

The 1916 New York state election was held on November 7, 1916, to elect the governor, the lieutenant governor, the secretary of state, the state comptroller, the attorney general, the state treasurer, the state engineer, a U.S. senator, the chief judge and an associate judge of the New York Court of Appeals, as well as all members of the New York State Assembly and the New York State Senate.

== History ==
The primaries were held on September 19.

=== Republican primary ===
1916 Republican primary results
Office				
Governor	Charles S. Whitman	254,177	William M. Bennett	44,720
Lieutenant Governor	Edward Schoeneck			
Secretary of State	Francis M. Hugo			
Comptroller	Eugene M. Travis	216,878	James F. Hooker	53,710
Attorney General	Egburt E. Woodbury			
Treasurer	James L. Wells			
State Engineer	Frank M. Williams			
Chief Judge	Frank H. Hiscock			
Judge of the Court of Appeals	Cuthbert W. Pound			
U.S. Senator	William M. Calder	153,373	Robert Bacon	144,366

=== Democratic primary ===
1916 Democratic primary results
Office				
Governor	Samuel Seabury	158,718	(unopposed)	
Lieutenant Governor	Thomas J. Kreuzer			
Secretary of State	Frank M. Stage			
Comptroller	Joseph W. Masters			
Attorney General	William W. Farley			
Treasurer	Maurice S. Cohen			
State Engineer	Henry R. Beebe			
Chief Judge	Almet F. Jenks			
Judge of the Court of Appeals	John T. Norton			
U.S. Senator	William F. McCombs	99,307	Thomas F. Conway	52,756

=== Progressive primary ===
1916 Progressive primary results
Office				
Governor	Charles S. Whitman	11,483	Samuel Seabury	6,020
Lieutenant Governor	L. Bradley Dorr	7,390	Edward Schoeneck	7,257
Secretary of State	Francis M. Hugo			
Comptroller	Eugene M. Travis			
Attorney General	Robert H. Elder			
Treasurer	Frank P. Tucker			
State Engineer				
Chief Judge	Frank H. Hiscock	7,965	Almet F. Jenks	6,272
Judge of the Court of Appeals	Cuthbert W. Pound			
U.S. Senator	Bainbridge Colby	7,006	William M. Calder	6,875

=== Independence League primary ===
1916 Independence League primary results
Office				
Governor	Charles S. Whitman	1,763	Samuel Seabury	691
Lieutenant Governor				
Secretary of State				
Comptroller				
Attorney General				
Treasurer				
State Engineer				
Chief Judge	Almet F. Jenks			
Judge of the Court of Appeals	John T. Norton			
U.S. Senator	Bainbridge Colby			

=== American Party primary ===
1916 American Party primary results
Office				
Governor	Charles S. Whitman	38	Samuel Seabury	37
Lieutenant Governor				
Secretary of State				
Comptroller				
Attorney General				
Treasurer				
State Engineer				
Chief Judge				
Judge of the Court of Appeals				
U.S. Senator	Robert Bacon	23	William F. McCombs	22

== Result ==
The whole Republican ticket was elected.

The incumbents Whitman, Schoeneck, Hugo, Travis, Woodbury, Wells and Williams were re-elected.

The Republican, Democratic, Socialist and Prohibition parties maintained automatic ballot access (necessary 10,000 votes); the Independence League, Progressive and American parties lost it; and the Socialist Labor Party did not re-attain it.

36 Republicans and 15 Democrats were elected to the New York State Senate, to sit in the 140th and 141st New York State Legislatures (1917–1918).

99 Republicans, 49 Democrats and 2 Socialists were elected to the New York State Assembly, to sit in the 140th New York State Legislature (1917).

1916 state election results
Office	Republican ticket		Democratic ticket		Socialist ticket		Prohibition ticket		Progressive ticket		Independence League ticket		Socialist Labor ticket		American ticket	
Governor	Charles S. Whitman	835,820	Samuel Seabury	686,862	Algernon Lee	62,560	Charles E. Welch	21,773	Charles S. Whitman	6,669	Charles S. Whitman	5,266	Jeremiah D. Crowley	3,847	Charles S. Whitman	2,265
Lieutenant Governor	Edward Schoeneck	812,646	Thomas J. Kreuzer	638,894	Stephen J. Mahoney	60,402	Clarence Z. Spriggs	34,295	L. Bradley Dorr	7,146	Edward Schoeneck		Boris Reinstein	4,313	Thomas J. Kreuzer	
Secretary of State	Francis M. Hugo	840,554	Frank M. Stage	619,284	Pauline M. Newman	63,318	Neil D. Cranmer	23,340	Francis M. Hugo		Francis M. Hugo		John Hall	5,092	Francis M. Hugo	
Comptroller	Eugene M. Travis	833,361	Joseph W. Masters	618,759	Charles W. Noonan	62,904	George A. Norton	22,335	Eugene M. Travis		Joseph W. Masters		Anthony Houtenbrink	4,641	Joseph W. Masters	
Attorney General	Egburt E. Woodbury	819,269	William W. Farley	619,695	S. John Block	63,391	Claude W. Stowell	21,059	Robert H. Elder	10,237	William A. DeFord	8,407	Erwin A. Archer	4,005	William W. Farley	
Treasurer	James L. Wells	841,710	Maurice S. Cohen	592,569	Eugene Wood	62,575	William J. Richardson	22,229	Frank P. Tucker	7,167	James L. Wells		John P. Gilly	4,126	Eugene M. Lane	9,210
State Engineer	Frank M. Williams	814,794	Henry R. Beebe	619,493	George H. Warner	64,347	William B. Timbrell	20,873	Frank M. Williams		Frank M. Williams		Lewis F. Alrutz	4,181	Ephraim H. Keyes	5,136
Chief Judge	Frank H. Hiscock	822,995	Almet F. Jenks	605,528	Louis B. Boudin	63,996	Erwin J. Baldwin	24,007	Frank H. Hiscock		Almet F. Jenks		Jacob Alexander	5,507	Almet F. Jenks	
Judge of the Court of Appeals	Cuthbert W. Pound		John T. Norton		Hezekiah D. Wilcox		Coleridge A. Hart		Cuthbert W. Pound		John T. Norton					
U.S. Senator	William M. Calder	839,314	William F. McCombs	605,933	Joseph D. Cannon	61,167	D. Leigh Colvin	19,302	Bainbridge Colby	15,339	Bainbridge Colby		August Gillhaus	4,086	William F. McCombs	

Obs.:

- Numbers are total votes on all tickets for candidates who ran on more than one ticket, except for Whitman. The votes received for governor were used to determine ballot access.

== See also ==
- New York gubernatorial elections
- New York state elections

== Sources ==
- Names on primary ballot: CANDIDATES RUSH TO FILE PETITIONS in NYT on August 23, 1916
- Candidates in the primaries: PROGRESSIVE VOTE FACTOR IN PRIMARIES in NYT on September 17, 1916
- Early returns of the primaries: Nominees Chosen at the Primaries in NYT on September 20, 1916
- Primary results: CALDER BEAT BACON 9,007 in NYT on September 27, 1916
- Sketches of Hiscock and Jenks: FOR CHIEF JUDGE OF THE COURT OF APPEALS in NYT on October 14, 1916
- Early returns: WHITMAN BEATS SEABURY; CALDER CHOSEN SENATOR in NYT on November 8, 1916,

Vote totals from New York Red Book 1917
