= William Jones Seabury =

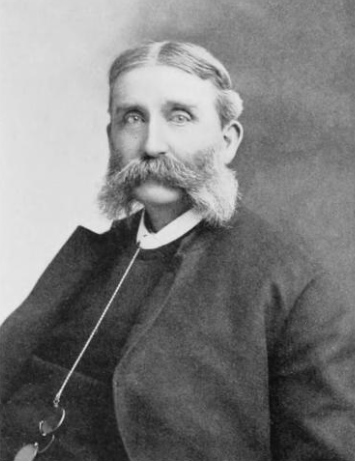
- Born: January 25, 1837; New York, New York, US
- Died: August 30, 1916 (aged 79); East Hampton, New York, US
- Occupations: Priest, lawyer, writer
- Children: Samuel Seabury
- Father: Samuel Seabury

William Jones Seabury (January 25, 1837 – August 30, 1916) was an American Episcopal priest, canon lawyer, and author.

== Biography ==
William Jones Seabury was born in New York City on January 25, 1837, the son of Samuel Seabury (1801–1872) and great-grandson of Bishop Samuel Seabury. William Jones Seabury served as rector of the Church of the Annunciation in New York from 1868 to 1898; he was the father of notable American judge Samuel Seabury.

He died at his son's summer home in East Hampton, New York on August 30, 1916, and was buried at Trinity Church Cemetery in Manhattan.

== Bibliography ==
- Suggestions in Aid of Devotion and Godliness, Designed Chiefly for Choristers (1878)
- Lectures on Apostolic Succession (1893)
- An Introduction to the Study of Ecclesiastical Polity (1894)
- Notes on the Constitution of 1901 (1902)
- Memoir of Bishop Seabury (1908)
