= George Kelley Paperback and Pulp Fiction Collection =

Collection of magazines and books

Coordinates: 43.0008°N 78.7895°W

The George Kelley Paperback and Pulp Fiction Collection is a collection of over 30,000 pulp magazine and paperback fiction works that is housed in the Special Collections unit, in the University at Buffalo Libraries at the State University of New York at Buffalo. Noted as one of the best preserved collections of pulp material and paperbacks in modern times, it was donated to UB Libraries in 1994 by Dr. George Kelley, a professor at Erie Community College in Buffalo, New York.

The collection spans genres from adventure, crime and horror to Westerns, fantasy and science fiction, including books, pulp magazines, fanzines and other literature. According to UB Libraries, there are hundreds of paperbacks from the 1940s, thousands from the 1950s and 1960s and more from the 1970s and 1980s. Many of these are paperback originals which have never appeared in hardcover editions.

== George Kelley ==
Kelley, an alumnus of SUNY at Buffalo, donated the collection to the Lockwood Memorial Library in 1994. Kelley received a doctorate of philosophy from SUNY at Buffalo in 1996, and has received master's degrees from UB in business administration, library science, and English. He is currently a professor of Business Administration at Erie Community College. After being an avid collector of comic books in his youth, Kelley began collecting paperback books and fiction magazines in his late youth and continued to do so until the 1990s. A majority of his collection was amassed during the 1970s when he would frequent used book stores on his work-related travels across the country. Kelley was keen on preserving his collection throughout the years, storing the works in Ziploc bags.

== Dr. Thomas and Margarete Shaw ==
In addition to Kelley's collection, Dr. Thomas Shaw and his wife, Margarete Shaw, have also contributed a large number of gifts and books to the collection. The Shaws’ contribution to the collection is entirely composed of fantasy and science-fiction based works and magazines.

== Notable authors ==
(Note: Some of this information was derived from the main UB Libraries website, which lists authors and in some cases, pseudonyms. Pseudonyms are noted, and links to their respective author/publishing firm have been provided, if available.)

- Edward S. Aarons
- Poul Anderson
- Isaac Asimov
- James Axler (Note: pseudonym for publishing franchise, see linked article)
- J. G. Ballard
- Ray Bradbury
- Marion Zimmer Bradley
- Dan Brennan
- Carter Brown
- Lolah Burford
- William S. Burroughs
- James M. Cain
- Lou Cameron (Note: See Classics Illustrated - Artists)
- Henry Cecil
- Raymond Chandler
- Arthur C. Clarke
- Bill Crider
- Samuel R. Delany
- Philip K. Dick
- Gordon R. Dickson
- Andre Dubus
- David Eddings
- George A. Effinger
- Harlan Ellison
- Jack Finney
- Erle Stanley Gardner
- Edward Gorman
- Bill Granger
- Charles L. Grant
- Zane Grey
- Dashiell Hammett
- John Hardesty
- J. D. Hardin (Note: see Donald Bain - Hardin Western Series)
- Matt Harding
- Stephen King/Richard Bachman (Note: Stephen King can be found in the collection under Richard Bachman, a pseudonym. Reportedly the Kelley collection contains an elusive English version of one of his books)
- Joe R. Lansdale
- Richard Laymon
- Ursula K. Le Guin
- Richard Levinson
- Jake Logan (Note: See Slocum Westerns)
- Jack London
- H. P. Lovecraft
- John D. MacDonald
- Ed McBain
- William Moore ?
- David Morrell
- Harry Patterson
- Richard Patterson
- Don Pendleton
- Bill Pronzini
- Ellery Queen
- Joanna Russ
- Jon Sharpe
- Robert Silverberg
- Clifford Simak
- David C. Smith
- Mickey Spillane
- Clay Tanner
- Ross Thomas
- Jim Thompson
- Tereska Torrès
- E.C. Tubb
- Gore Vidal
- Lionel White
- Gene Wolfe
- Ed Wood
- Cornell Woolrich
- Timothy Zahn
- Roger Zelazny

== Relevance of collection ==
Academically, the George Kelley Paperback and Pulp Fiction Collection stands as a vast resource of cultural information that is reflected in the discourse of the works and their imagery, especially sub-culture's social attitudes and behaviors, as well as evolving gender roles and identities in mid-20th century America. Further, some works published first in paperback form in the George Kelley Paperback and Pulp Fiction Collection have been noted for their alternative lifestyle storylines and content, suggesting an informative understanding of the gay and lesbian world, providing literature oriented towards homosexuality around the 1950s.

For many of the works in the collection, their documentation via the University at Buffalo's library system represents the first time the works have been acknowledged in a national or universal library system (WorldCat)

Some have appraised the collection's value into the millions of US dollars.

== Popular culture ==
The most valuable book in the collection, according to George Kelley, is an original copy of Junkie by William S. Burroughs, with a value estimated at around US $2500. Junkie is often cited as the seminal literature on heroin addiction in America.

According to Dr. George Kelley, his passion for collecting paperbacks and fiction magazines emerged in his adolescence after his mother had disposed of his personal collection of over 1000 comic books while he was away at camp. Dr. George Kelley admits that he decided to donate the collection to University at Buffalo, after receiving an ultimatum from his wife who told him: "I can't get to the washer and dryer because of all the shelving. Do you want clean clothes...or books?" Dr. Kelley chose clean clothes. Every work in the collection continues to be housed in the original Ziploc bag it was placed in when Dr. George Kelley added them to the collection.

A work from the collection,The Guilty Are Afraid by James Hadley Chase, had the honor of being the 37th million record to the WorldCat database, in June 1997.

The collection is currently located in a closed stacks area of the Lockwood Memorial Library at the University at Buffalo, awaiting space being made available for its future permanent home at the Special Collections Unit at Capen Libraries. The collection is available for access to the general public.

A discovery seminar, instructed by Judy Adams-Volpe, the former director of communications for the UB Libraries, offered UB students the opportunity to explore the collection in depth. Through the functions of the seminar, many of the works' plots have been summarized into an online database (plot summary database), as well as cover-art scans of several of the collections' more notable covers.

== See also ==
- Billy Ireland Cartoon Library & Museum
- Fred Waring Cartoon Collection
- Michigan State University Comic Art Collection
