= 1914 New York state election =

1914 New York gubernatorial election
- November 3, 1914
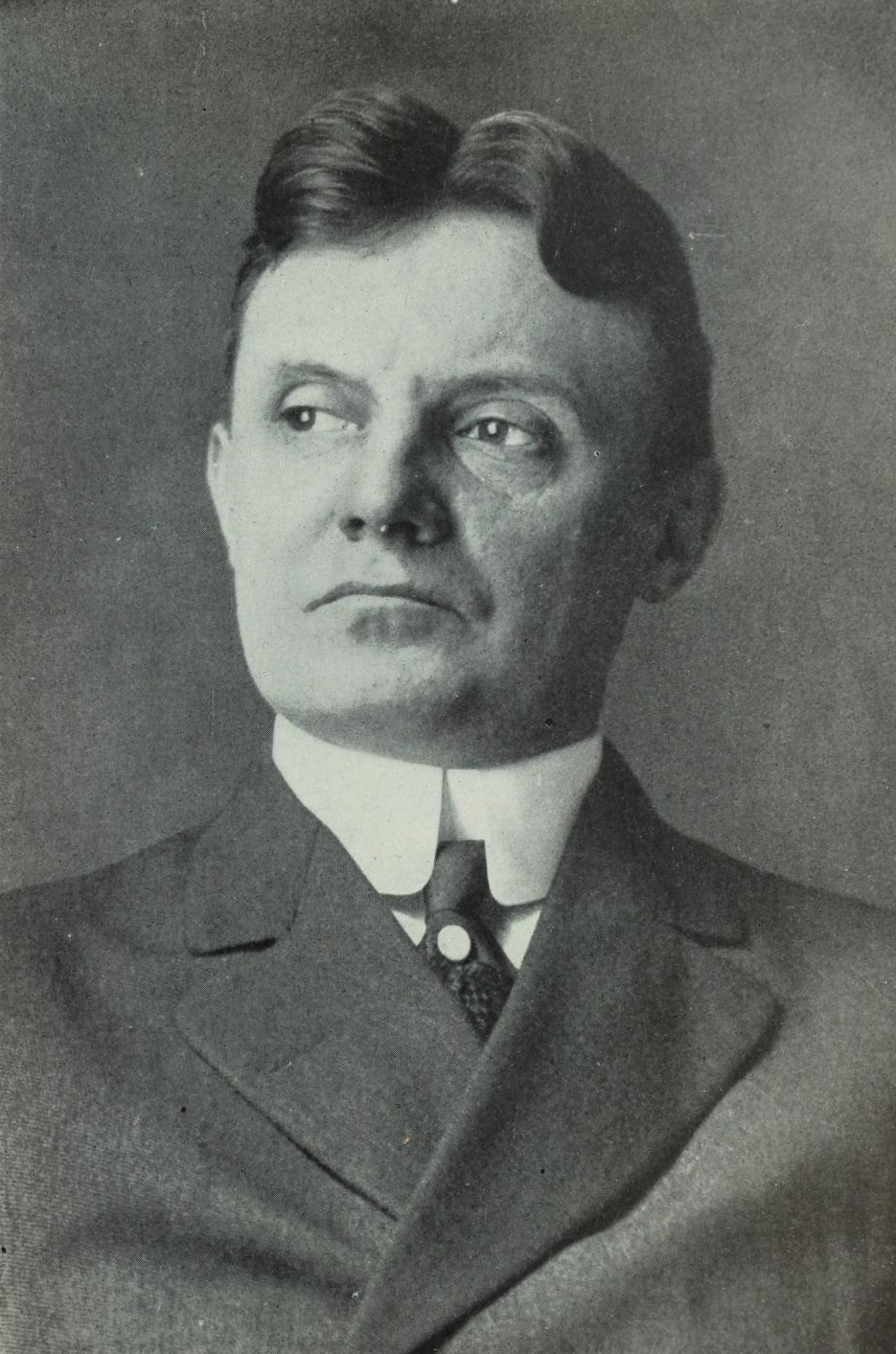

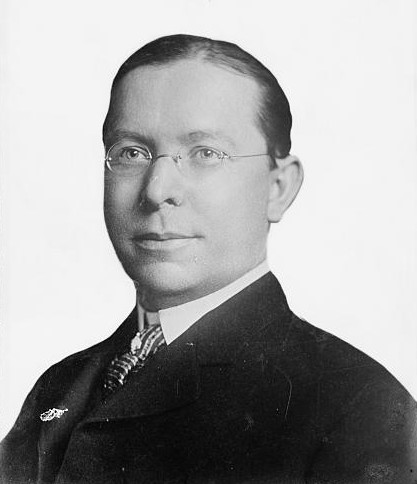

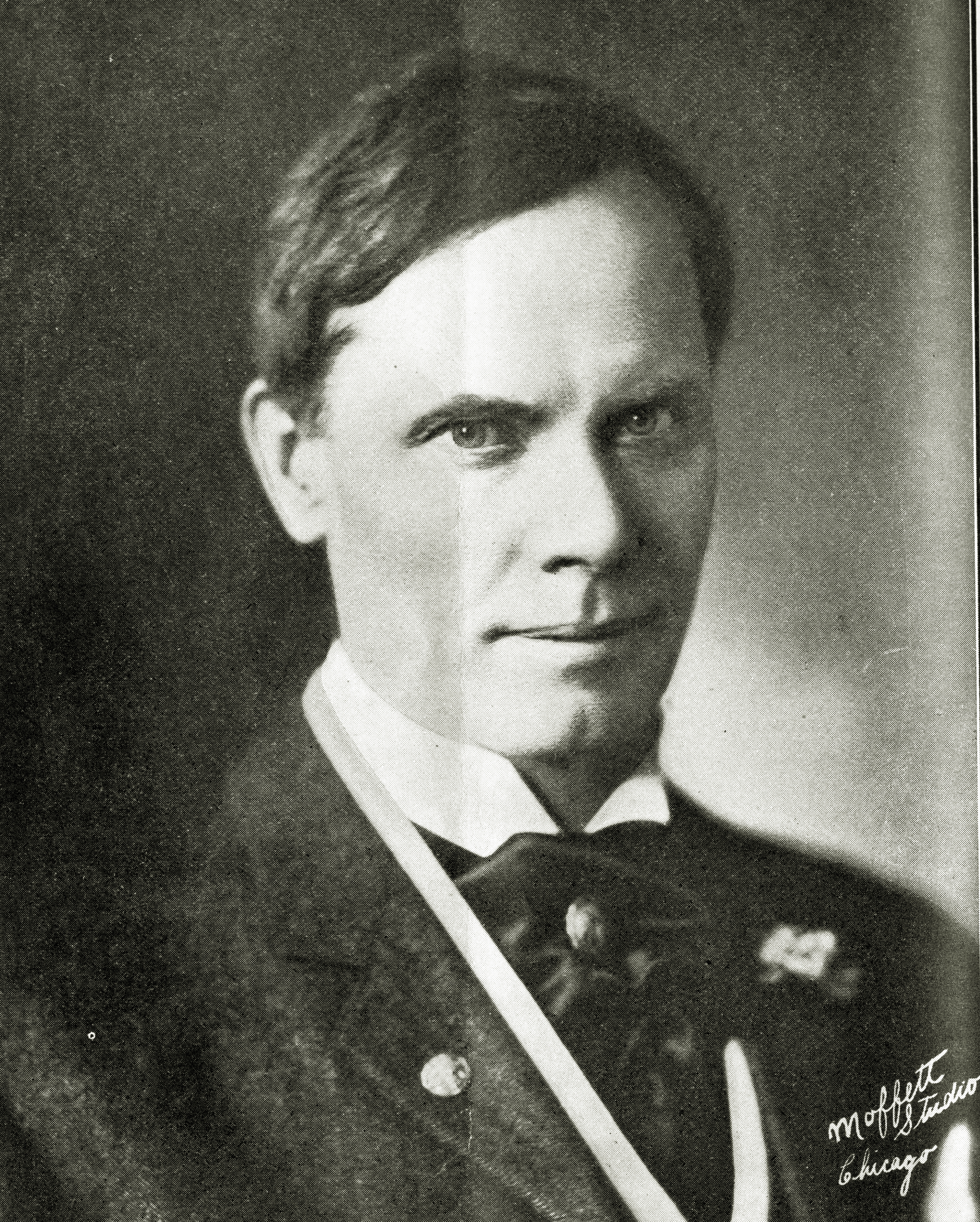
Nominee	Charles S. Whitman	Martin Glynn	William Sulzer
Party	Republican	Democratic	American
Alliance		Independence; Independent	Prohibition; Independent
Popular vote	686,701	541,269	126,270
Percentage	47.69%	37.59%	8.77%
- County results Whitman: 30–40% 40–50% 50–60% 60–70% Glynn: 40–50% 50–60% Sulzer: 30–40%
Governor before election
Martin Glynn
Democratic
Elected Governor
Charles S. Whitman
Republican

The 1914 New York state election was held on November 3, 1914, to elect the governor, the lieutenant governor, the secretary of state, the state comptroller, the attorney general, the state treasurer, the state engineer, a U.S. senator and a judge of the New York Court of Appeals, as well as all members of the New York State Assembly and the New York State Senate, and delegates-at-large to the New York State Constitutional Convention of 1915.

== History ==
This was the first time that U.S. Senators from New York were elected by general ballot. Until 1911, the U.S. Senators had been elected by the New York State Legislature, but the lengthy stalemate between Tammany and a faction led by State Senator Franklin D. Roosevelt, who had decided to impede the election of William F. Sheehan or any other crony of Tammany boss Charles F. Murphy, led to a constitutional amendment. Since 1914, the U.S. Senators have been elected with the state officers on the state ticket, and selected in the party primaries.

The Socialist state convention met on July 5 at Rochester, New York. They nominated Charles Edward Russell for U.S. Senator; Gustave Adolph Strebel for governor; Stephen J. Mahoney, of Buffalo, for lieutenant governor; Mrs. Florence C. Kitchelt, of Rochester, for secretary of state; Charles W. Noonan, of Schenectady, for comptroller; James C. Sheehan, of Albany, for treasurer; Frederick O. Haller, of Buffalo, for attorney general; Prof. Vladimir Karapetoff, of Cornell University, for state engineer; and Louis B. Boudin for the Court of Appeals.

The Prohibition State Committee met on August 15 at Syracuse, New York, and voted to nominate Ex-Governor William Sulzer for governor instead of the previously selected Charles E. Welch, who then ran for lieutenant governor.

This was the first state election at which the parties with "party status" - at this time, the Democratic, Republican and Progressive parties - were required to hold primary elections to nominate candidates for state offices. The primaries were held on September 28.

=== Republican primary ===
1914 Republican primary results
Office						
Governor	Charles S. Whitman	120,073	Harvey D. Hinman	61,952	Job E. Hedges	43,012
Lieutenant Governor	Edward Schoeneck	78,563	Seth G. Heacock	68,303	Frank A. Sidway	57,348
Secretary of State	Francis M. Hugo	71,037	William D. Cunningham	67,050	Eugene H. Porter	58,845
Comptroller	Eugene M. Travis	88,765	James Hooker	62,414	Samuel Strasburger	48,519
Attorney General	Egburt E. Woodbury	124,009	Edward R. O'Malley	72,467		
Treasurer	James L. Wells	184,043				
State Engineer	Frank M. Williams	159,243	Arthur O'Brien	36,892		
Judge of the Court of Appeals	Emory A. Chase	180,394				
U.S. Senator	James W. Wadsworth, Jr.	89,960	William M. Calder	82,895	David Jayne Hill	37,102

=== Democratic primary ===
1914 Democratic primary results
Office						
Governor	Martin H. Glynn	175,772	John A. Hennessy	68,387		
Lieutenant Governor	Thomas B. Lockwood	158,159	William Gorham Rice	57,305		
Secretary of State	Mitchell May	167,198	Sidney Newborg	43,251		
Comptroller	William Sohmer	158,309	George G. Davidson, Jr.	58,077		
Attorney General	James A. Parsons	151,122	John Larkin	57,096		
Treasurer	Albert C. Carp	147,443	Charles E. Sunderlin	55,055		
State Engineer	John A. Bensel	146,533	Raleigh Bennett	58,485		
Judge of the Court of Appeals	Samuel Seabury	139,694	John N. Carlisle	65,820		
U.S. Senator	James W. Gerard	138,815	Franklin D. Roosevelt	63,879	James F. McDonough	17,862

=== Progressive primary ===
1914 Progressive primary results
Office				
Governor	Frederick M. Davenport	18,643	William Sulzer	14,366

The other Progressive candidates were nominated unopposed.

The Socialist Labor ticket was filed with the Secretary of State on October 9, 1914. They nominated a full ticket.

Ex-Governor Sulzer's aim was to defeat Glynn whom he considered a back-stabber. For this purpose he organized the American Party, and accepted the nomination by the Prohibition Party. He also sought the nomination of the Progressive Party, but was defeated in their primary. The American Party Executive Committee also endorsed a full slate (Prohibitionists Welch and Clements; Progressives Call and Colby; Democrat Seabury; Charles Horowitz for comptroller; Charles Podsenick for attorney general; and Robert Butler for State Engineer) for the other offices, but did not file a petition to nominate them, so they did not appear on the ballot in the American column.

== Result ==
Almost the whole Republican ticket was elected; only Justice Seabury managed to defeat the Republican candidate Emory A. Chase.

The incumbents Glynn, May, Sohmer, Parsons, Call and Bensel were defeated.

The Republican, Democratic, Independence League, Progressive, Socialist and Prohibition parties maintained automatic ballot access (necessary 10,000 votes for governor), the American Party attained it, and the Socialist Labor Party did not re-attain it.

34 Republicans and 17 Democrats were elected to a two-year term (1915–16) in the New York State Senate.

100 Republicans, 49 Democrats and one Progressive were elected for the session of 1915 to the New York State Assembly.

1914 state election results
Office	Republican ticket		Democratic ticket		Independence League ticket		American ticket		Prohibition ticket		Progressive ticket		Socialist ticket		Social Labor ticket	
Governor	Charles S. Whitman	686,701	Martin H. Glynn	412,253	Martin H. Glynn	125,252	William Sulzer	70,655	William Sulzer	54,189	Frederick M. Davenport	45,686	Gustave Adolph Strebel	37,793	James T. Hunter	2,350
Lieutenant Governor	Edward Schoeneck	622,493	Thomas B. Lockwood	534,660	Edward Schoeneck		(none)		Charles E. Welch	44,484	Chauncey J. Hamlin	113,385	Stephen J. Mahoney	51,304	Jeremiah D. Crowley	3,566
Secretary of State	Francis M. Hugo	601,857	Mitchell May	561,429	Mitchell May		(none)		John R. Clements	68,049	Sydney W. Stern	72,371	Florence Cross Kitchelt	52,970	Edmund Moonelis	3,490
Comptroller	Eugene M. Travis	657,373	William Sohmer	553,254	William Sohmer		(none)		Neil D. Cranmer	29,373	John B. Burnham	68,111	Charles W. Noonan	51,845	Charles E. Berns	3,579
Attorney General	Egburt E. Woodbury	651,869	James A. Parsons	529,045	Edward R. O'Malley	12,132	(none)		Walter T. Bliss	27,949	Robert H. Elder	77,945	Frederick O. Haller	52,808	John Hall	3,711
Treasurer	James L. Wells	622,811	Albert C. Carp	526,025	Homer D. Call		(none)		Edward A. Packer	29,071	Homer D. Call	117,628	James C. Sheehan	54,202	Anthony Houtenbrink	3,561
State Engineer	Frank M. Williams	677,393	John A. Bensel	509,944	John Martin	9,686	(none)		James Adamson	27,723	Lloyd Collis	68,110	Vladimir Karapetoff	51,980	August Gillhaus	3,676
Judge of the Court of Appeals	Emory A. Chase	594,414	Samuel Seabury	650,468	Samuel Seabury		(none)		Coleridge A. Hart	28,337	Samuel Seabury		Louis B. Boudin	52,225	Edmund Seidel	5,054
U.S. Senator	James W. Wadsworth, Jr.	639,112	James W. Gerard	571,419	James W. Gerard		(none)		Francis E. Baldwin	27,813	Bainbridge Colby	61,977	Charles Edward Russell	55,266	Erwin A. Archer	3064

Obs.:

- The vote for governor defines the ballot access.
- Numbers are total votes on all tickets for candidates who ran on more than one ticket, except for governor.
- Glynn also polled 3,764 votes; and Sulzer 1,426; in the "no-party column," a blank space provided for write-in candidates.

== See also ==
- New York gubernatorial elections

== Sources ==
- Petitions for tickets: PETITIONS FILED IN ALBANY in NYT on September 9, 1914
- The primary ballots: HENNESSY'S NAME LEADS in NYT on September 15, 1914
- Result (parcial) of Primaries: VOTE FOR GOVERNOR AND SENATOR in NYT on September 29, 1914
- The tickets, and sketches of candidates for Governor and Senator: FULL TICKETS OF THE PARTIES in NYT on October 25, 1914
- Result (final) of Primaries: PRIMARY CALLED OUT HALF STATE VOTE in NYT on October 9, 1914
- Result: WHITMAN WON BY 145,432 in NYT on December 5, 1914
- Vote totals from New York Red Book 1915
