= Eaton Estates, Ohio =

- Census-designated place
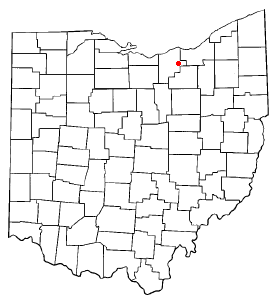
- Location of Eaton Estates, Ohio
- Coordinates: 41°18′22″N 82°00′41″W
- Country: United States
- State: Ohio
- County: Lorain
- Township: Eaton

Area
  - Total: 0.87 sq mi (2.26 km^{2})
  - Land: 0.87 sq mi (2.25 km^{2})
  - Water: 0.0039 sq mi (0.01 km^{2})
- Elevation: 801 ft (244 m)

Population (2020)
  - Total: 1,155
  - Density: 1,328.4/sq mi (512.88/km^{2})
- Time zone: UTC-5 (Eastern (EST))
  - Summer (DST): UTC-4 (EDT)
- FIPS code: 39-24262
- GNIS feature ID: 2392986

Eaton Estates is an unincorporated community and census-designated place (CDP) in Lorain County, Ohio, United States. The population was 1,155 at the 2020 census.

== Geography ==
Eaton Estates is located in eastern Lorain County in central Eaton Township. It is bordered to the south by the village of Grafton, to the east by unincorporated North Eaton, and to the northwest by the unincorporated hamlet of Eaton.

Ohio State Route 82 forms part of the northern boundary of the CDP, and State Route 83 forms the western boundary. SR 82 leads east 9 miles (14 km) to Strongsville and west 3.5 miles (5.6 km) to Brentwood Lake, while SR 83 leads north 5 miles (8 km) to North Ridgeville and south 11 miles (18 km) to Litchfield. Elyria, the Lorain county seat, is 7 miles (11 km) to the northwest, and downtown Cleveland is 26 miles (42 km) to the northeast.

According to the United States Census Bureau, the Eaton Estates CDP has a total area of 0.89 square miles (2.3 km^{2}), of which 1.7 acres (6,851 m^{2}), or 0.30%, are water. Land in Eaton Estates drains to Willow Creek, a northwest-flowing tributary of the Black River, which flows north to Lake Erie at Lorain.

== Demographics ==
Historical population
Census	Pop.	Note	%±
2020	1,155		—
U.S. Decennial Census

As of the census of 2000, there were 1,409 people, 458 households, and 382 families residing in the CDP. The population density was 1,601.7 inhabitants per square mile (618.4/km^{2}). There were 470 housing units at an average density of 534.3 per square mile (206.3/km^{2}). The racial makeup of the CDP was 98.23% White, 0.43% African American, 0.14% Native American, 0.21% Asian, 0.21% from other races, and 0.78% from two or more races. Hispanic or Latino of any race were 1.28% of the population.

There were 458 households, out of which 40.8% had children under the age of 18 living with them, 60.5% were married couples living together, 13.1% had a female householder with no husband present, and 16.4% were non-families. 14.0% of all households were made up of individuals, and 5.7% had someone living alone who was 65 years of age or older. The average household size was 3.08 and the average family size was 3.35.

In the CDP, the population was spread out, with 30.7% under the age of 18, 7.2% from 18 to 24, 32.4% from 25 to 44, 20.0% from 45 to 64, and 9.7% who were 65 years of age or older. The median age was 33 years. For every 100 females, there were 99.9 males. For every 100 females age 18 and over, there were 100.2 males.

The median income for a household in the CDP was $48,804, and the median income for a family was $51,027. Males had a median income of $31,768 versus $19,861 for females. The per capita income for the CDP was $16,041. About 5.9% of families and 7.0% of the population were below the poverty line, including 9.4% of those under age 18 and none of those age 65 or over.
