= John M. Chambers (politician) =

American politician (1845–1916)

Member of the New York State Assembly from the 1st Rensselaer County district
- In office January 1, 1902 – December 31, 1903
- Preceded by: Hugh Galbraith
- Succeeded by: Frank L. Stevens

Member of the New York State Assembly from the 2nd Rensselaer County district
- In office January 1, 1893 – December 31, 1895
- Preceded by: Levi E. Worden
- Succeeded by: John T. Norton

Personal details
- Born: John Miller Chambers; July 21, 1845 Ireland
- Died: June 11, 1916 (aged 70) Lansingburgh, New York, U.S.
- Party: Republican
- Spouses: Anna E. Densmore (m. 1873; died 1878); Olive Addie Howes (m. 1882)
- Occupation: Grocer; clerk; politician

John Miller Chambers (July 21, 1845 – June 11, 1916) was an Irish-American businessman and politician from New York.

== Life ==
Chambers was born on July 21, 1845, in Ireland. He immigrated to America when he was very young. He lived in Lansingburgh from around 1851.

When he was young he entered the grocery business in Lansingburgh, starting the firm Davenport & Chambers. He ran the business until his death.

Chambers served as village clerk, receiver of taxes, town supervisor, school trustee, and village trustee. In 1892, he was elected to the New York State Assembly as a Republican, representing the Rensselaer County 2nd District. He served in the Assembly in 1893, 1894, 1895, 1902, and 1903.

Chambers was married twice: first, on April 28, 1873, to Anna E. Densmore, who predeceased him in 1878, and second, on August 26, 1882, to Olive Addie Howes. He was survived by two daughters from his marriage with Olive: Mary C. and Anna M. He was an active member of the local Presbyterian Church and served on its board of trustees. He was a member of the Freemasons and the Royal Arch Masonry.

Chambers died at home on June 11, 1916.

New York State Assembly
Preceded by Levi E. Worden	New York State Assembly; Rensselaer County, 2nd District; 1893-1895	Succeeded by John T. Norton
Preceded by Hugh Galbraith	New York State Assembly; Rensselaer County, 1st District; 1902-1903	Succeeded by Frank L. Stevens
