= University at Buffalo Libraries =

Coordinates: 43°00′05″N 78°47′22″W

- Location: Buffalo, New York
- Branches: 9

Collection
- Size: 4 Million Volumes

Other information
- Director: Evviva Weinraub Lajoie
- Website: library.buffalo.edu

The University at Buffalo Libraries is the university library system of the University at Buffalo. The library's collections includes some 3.8 million print volumes, as well as media, and special collections. The Libraries subscribe to some 350 research databases and 10,000 electronic journals.

Notable collections include the George Kelley Paperback and Pulp Fiction Collection, the James Joyce Collection, the Love Canal Collections, and the Robert Graves Collection.

== Libraries ==
=== Oscar A. Silverman Library ===
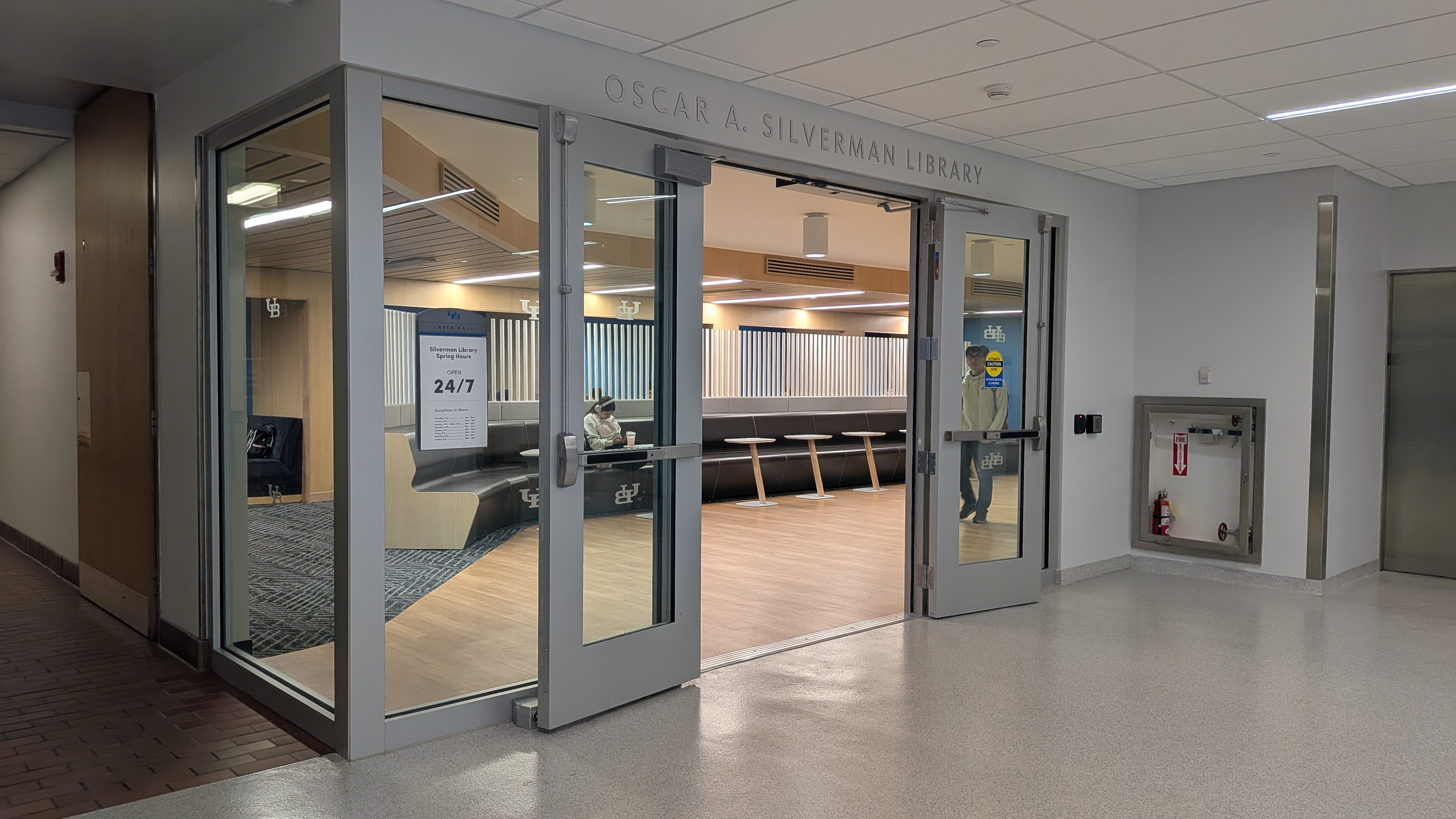
The entrance to Oscar A. Silverman Library from inside Capen Hall.

In 2016, the Silverman Library's $7.2 million renovation was completed. A 2013 student survey about the library highlighted the need for more access to food, natural light, security, and power or USB ports for laptops, phones, and other electronic devices used by students. Over 200,000 books were removed to the Libraries Annex, other libraries on campus, or weeded to make room for group study rooms, study carrels, classrooms, a café, soundproof rooms, and over 1,000 power outlets. The library was closed for two years while renovations took place.

=== Lockwood Memorial Library ===
Lockwood Memorial Library is the largest of UB's libraries and is located on the North Campus. Its collections include over one million books, journals, government documents, and reference materials, supporting students and faculty in the schools of Arts and Sciences, Education, Engineering and Applied Sciences, Management, and Social Work. Among the notable collections housed within Lockwood are the Science & Engineering Information Center, the East Asian Collection, a Government Documents collection, a Graphic Novel Collection, an International Leisure Reading Collection, a Juvenile Collection, and a Map Collection. The George Kelley Paperback and Pulp Fiction Collection is also located within Lockwood. The Music Library, a separate unit of the UB Libraries, occupies the fifth floor of the building.

=== Music Library ===
The Music Library is located on the fifth floor of Lockwood Memorial Library on the North Campus. It supports the instructional and research needs of the UB Department of Music and provides resources to related disciplines. In addition to serving the university community, the Music Library also serves the local arts community of the Buffalo region and functions as a resource for casual listeners.

=== Abbott Library ===
Abbott Library is located in Abbott Hall on UB's South Campus at 3435 Main Street. Its collections and services support the research and instructional needs of students and faculty in UB's five health sciences schools: the Jacobs School of Medicine and Biomedical Sciences, the School of Dental Medicine, the School of Nursing, the School of Pharmacy and Pharmaceutical Sciences, and the School of Public Health and Health Professionals. The library's third floor houses the Architecture & Planning collection, which focuses on the fields of architecture, design, urban and regional planning, historic preservation, landscape architecture, and urban and environmental studies.

Abbott Library also contains the Robert L. Brown History of Medicine Collection, a special collection of historical materials spanning all areas of the health sciences, including dentistry, medicine, nursing, pharmacy, and public health.

The Polish Room, founded in 1955, is a special collection housed within Abbott Library that preserves Polish cultural and historical heritage through a collection of over 12,000 items.

=== Charles B. Sears Law Library ===
The Charles B. Sears Law Library is named for the Honorable Charles Brown Sears (1870–1949), a jurist and longtime supporter of the University of Buffalo who served as Vice Chairman of the University Council and received the Chancellor's Medal in 1944. The library occupies six floors in the center of O'Brian Hall on the North Campus, and is often referred to as "the heart of the Law School." Its collection comprises more than 470,000 volumes, augmented by an extensive array of online legal and cross-disciplinary resources. The library is described in its mission statement as the only research-level law library for New York legal materials in the Western New York region. When the School of Law moved to O'Brian Hall in 1973, the law library was named in Sears's honor.

=== Libraries Annex ===
The Libraries Annex is a high-density storage facility of more than 21,000 square feet located at 3850 Rensch Road in Amherst, New York. It houses more than one million low-use books and journals transferred from the active library collections. The building includes a document delivery scanning and processing center and staff work areas. Materials held at the Annex can be requested by patrons through the Libraries' Delivery+ service, with individual journal articles and book chapters delivered electronically, and books delivered to a campus library, a self-serve locker, a department office, or a home address. The Annex is not open to the public for on-site browsing.

== History ==
In 1922, Ruth Bartholomew was appointed as the first University Librarian. The library was originally located in Foster Hall but was moved to larger quarters in the second floor of Hayes Hall.

In 1929, Thomas B. Lockwood (1873–1947) donated $500,000 to the University of Buffalo for the construction of a library building. In the spring of 1935, the library was moved to the newly constructed Lockwood Memorial Library building. Designed by noted Buffalo architect E.B. Green and built in classic Georgian architectural style, the building was an elegant, four-story structure located at the heart of the South Campus. In addition to providing funds for the building, Lockwood also donated his personal collection of rare books.

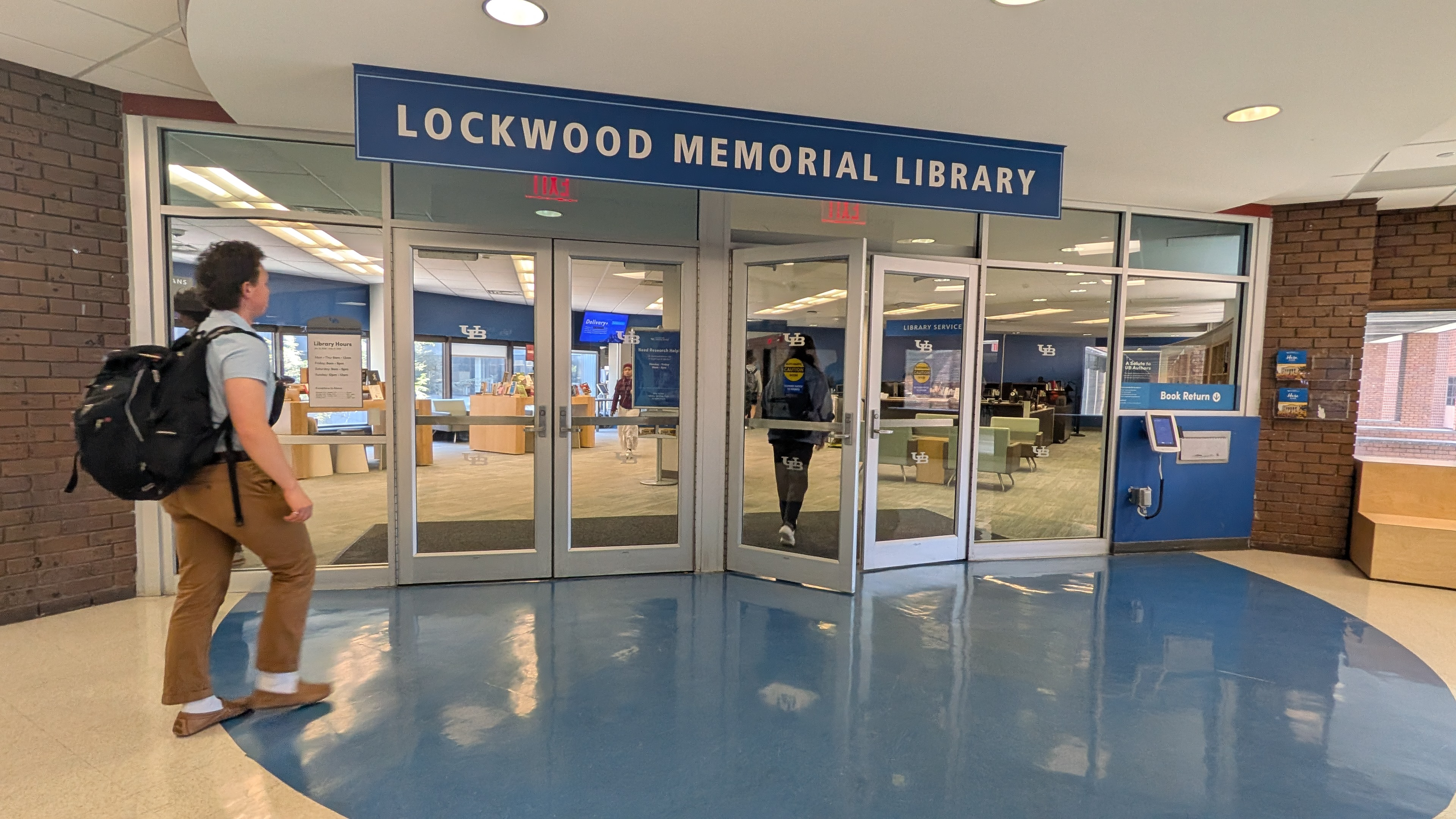
The interior entrance to Lockwood Memorial Library

On April 19, 1979, the new Lockwood Memorial Library was officially opened. Designed for the new campus in Amherst, the Lockwood Memorial Library name was to be placed on the new library in recognition of the original endowment established by Mr. Lockwood. The original Lockwood Memorial Library, renamed Charles D. Abbott Hall / Health Sciences Library, was renovated and enlarged in 1983–1985.

On June 16, 2023, the library system announced that it received $10 million in funding towards building a James Joyce museum.
