= Levi E. Worden =

American builder and politician

Levi Edmond Worden (March 28, 1849 – May 20, 1928) was an American builder and politician from New York.

== Life ==
Worden was born on March 28, 1849, in Grand Rapids, Michigan, the son of Harvey L. Worden and Ann Eliza Manning. When he was a boy, he moved with his family to Lloyd, New York, where his father manufactured agricultural implements.

In December 1863, during the American Civil War, Worden enlisted in the 16th New York Heavy Artillery Regiment as a private in Company B. He was mustered out with his company in August 1865. He participated in the Siege of Petersburg and the Second Battle of Fort Fisher.

After the War, he became a carpenter and moved to Bath-on-the-Hudson (today part of the city of Rensselaer). In 1880, he moved to Hoosick Falls. In 1883, he became a member of the contracting firm Easton & Rising, which then became Easton, Rising and Worden. The firm eventually became Worden and Son, Inc., with Worden as its president. The firm erected a number of buildings in and around Hoosick Falls, including the Municipal Building. He was also First Vice President of the People's National Bank of Hoosick Falls, and from 1887 to 1889 was the town supervisor of Hoosick.

In 1890, Worden was elected to the New York State Assembly as a Republican, representing the Rensselaer County 2nd District. He served in the Assembly in 1891 and 1892. While in the Assembly, he introduced and helped pass a bill that prohibited New York prisons from manufacturing shirts, collars, and cuffs. He later served three terms as Acting Superintendent of the Poor of Rensselaer County. He was a political advisor and close friend of New York governor Frank S. Black.

Worden was an active member of the Grand Army of the Republic, serving as commander of his local post. He was also a freemason and a member of the Independent Order of Odd Fellows, the Benevolent and Protective Order of Elks, and the Knights of Pythias. He served as deacon of the First Baptist Church of Hoosick Falls. He married Catherine Jane MacNab in 1868. Their children were Mrs. M. J. Early, Bertha A., Edith I., and Edmund L.

Worden died at home on May 20, 1928. He was buried in the family plot in Maple Grove Cemetery.

New York State Assembly
Preceded by Joseph S. Saunders	New York State Assembly; Rensselaer County, 2nd District; 1891-1892	Succeeded by John M. Chambers (New York politician)
