= N. Monroe Marshall =

American politician

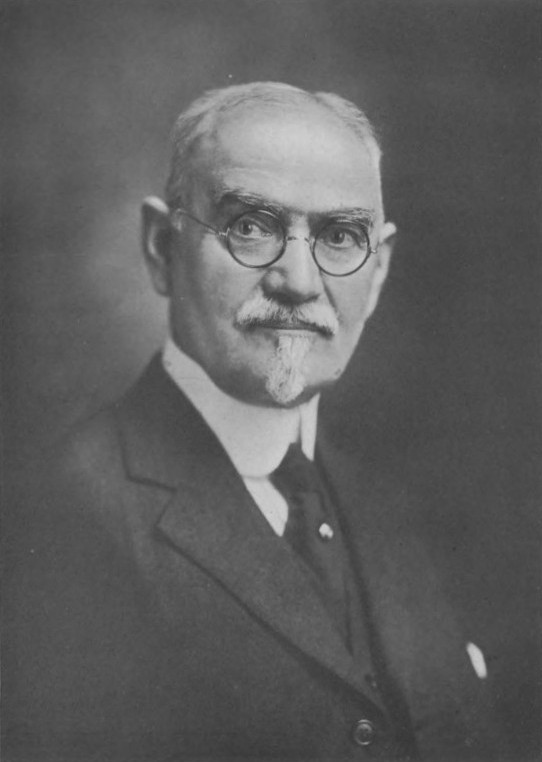
Marshall in 1921

Nathaniel Monroe Marshall (June 13, 1854, in Schuyler Falls, Clinton County, New York – February 16, 1935, in Malone, Franklin County, New York) was an American banker and politician.

== Life ==
He was the son of Nathaniel Marshall and Ann L. (Hackstaff) Marshall. In 1874, he became a telegraph operator and station agent for the Chateaugay Railroad at Plattsburgh, New York. Later he removed to Bellmont, New York, where he was employed as a bookkeeper by the Chateaugay Ore and Iron Company. On May 15, 1877, he married Lucy Ann Bellows (d. 1920), and they had two daughters and a son.

He entered politics as a Republican, and in 1885, he was supervisor of the Town of Bellmont, and the same year was elected county clerk of Franklin County, which post he held for two terms. Afterwards he became a claim adjuster for the Fidelity and Casualty Company until 1895, when he became vice president of the Farmers National Bank of Malone. In 1896, he transferred to the Peoples National Bank, later Peoples Trust Company, of Malone, of which he was vice president until 1898, president until 1930, and chairman of the board until his death.

He was a member of the New York State Senate (34th D.) from 1915 to 1920, sitting in the 138th, 139th, 140th, 141st, 142nd and 143rd New York State Legislature. He was New York State Treasurer from 1921 to 1922, elected at the New York state election, 1920, but defeated for re-election at the New York state election, 1922. He was a delegate to the 1928 Republican National Convention.

== Sources ==
- The state tickets, in NYT on November 5, 1922
- Shatagee Woods History: Hon. N. M. Marshall Ends Useful Life of Public Service at blogspot.com Obit in the Malone Farmer on February 20, 1935

Party political offices
Preceded by James L. Wells	Republican nominee for New York State Treasurer; 1920, 1922	Succeeded by Lewis H. Pounds
New York State Senate
Preceded by Herbert P. Coats	New York State Senate; 34th District; 1915–1920	Succeeded by Warren T. Thayer
Political offices
Preceded by James L. Wells	New York State Treasurer; 1921–1922	Succeeded by George K. Shuler
