= Samuel Seabury (judge) =

American judge (1873–1958)

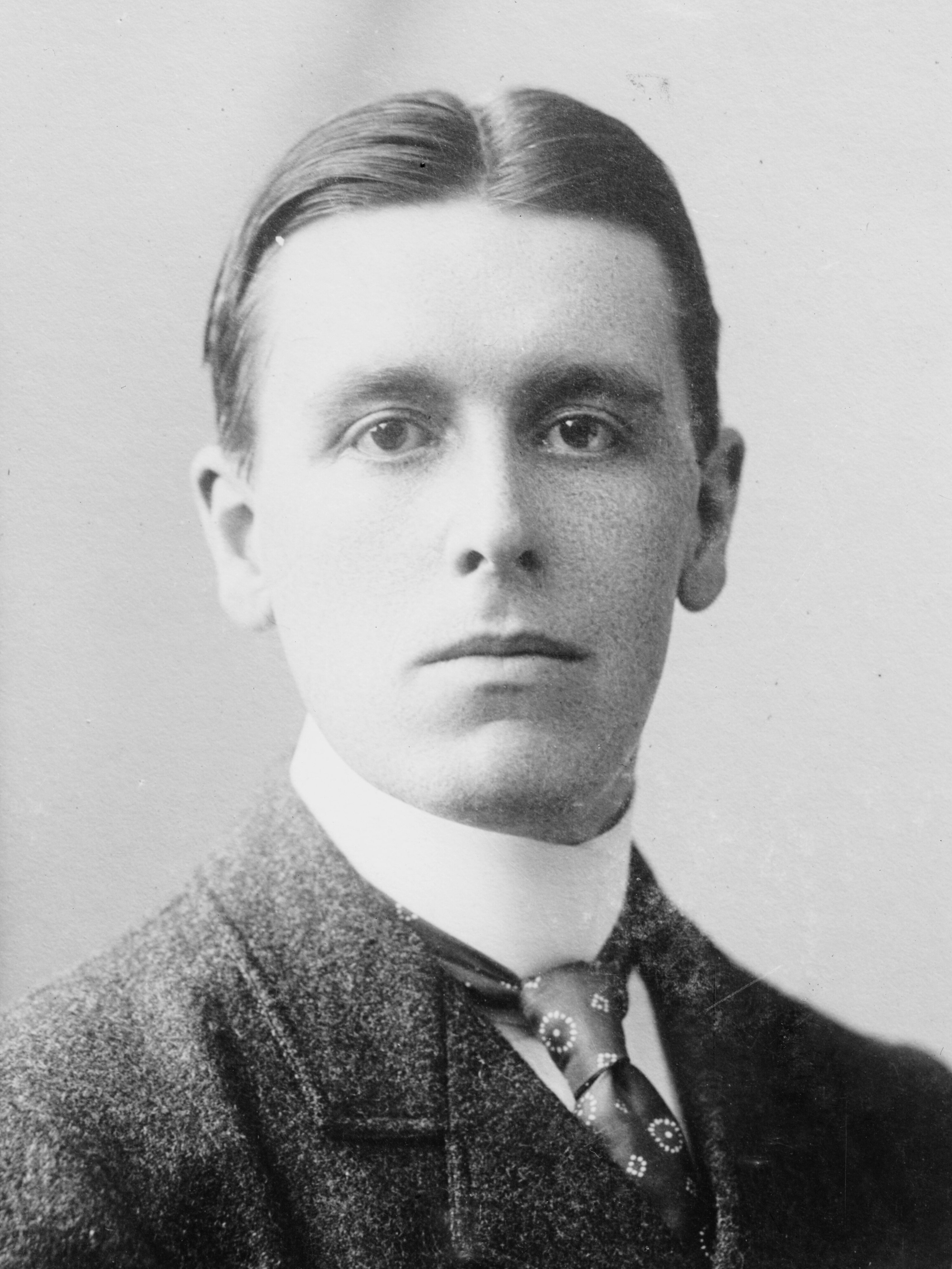
- Seabury c. 1901

Associate Judge of the New York Court of Appeals
- In office December 8, 1914 – January 15, 1917
- Preceded by: William B. Hornblower
- Succeeded by: Benjamin N. Cardozo

Justice of the New York Supreme Court
- In office January 1, 1907 – December 8, 1914

Judge of the New York City Court
- In office January 1, 1902 – December 31, 1906

Personal details
- Born: February 22, 1873 New York City, New York, U.S.
- Died: May 7, 1958 (aged 85) East Hampton, New York, U.S.
- Party: Democratic
- Other political affiliations: Jefferson Democracy (1897); Labor (1899); Citizens Union (1901); Liberal Democratic (1902); Municipal Ownership (1905); Independence (1906–1916); Progressive (1913–1916); American (1916); Republican (1934); City Fusion (1933–1941)
- Spouse: Maud Richey (m. 1900; died 1950)
- Relatives: Samuel Seabury (1729–1796) (ancestor); Samuel Seabury (1801–1872) (ancestor); Thomas Richey (father-in-law)
- Occupation: Judge, attorney, politician
- Known for: Seabury Commission

Samuel Seabury (February 22, 1873 – May 7, 1958) was an American lawyer and politician from New York. Seabury is famous for dedicating himself to a campaign against the corrupt Tammany dominance of New York City politics. He later presided over the extensive 1930–32 investigations of corruption in the New York City municipal government, which became known as the 'Seabury Hearings'. Seabury became a Georgist after reading Progress and Poverty. He applauded New York's adoption of proportional representation in 1937 as a way to democratize the city.

== Family ==
The Seabury family contained multiple Episcopal ministers including Samuel's great-great-grandfather, Samuel Seabury, who he was named after. This Samuel Seabury was the son of William Jones Seabury, professor of canon law (and himself the son of theologian Samuel Seabury), and Alice Van Wyck Beare. On June 6, 1900, this Sam Seabury married Maud Richey (d. 1950), daughter of Episcopal priest and seminary professor Thomas Richey. They had no children.

== Legal and judicial career ==
Seabury graduated from New York Law School in 1893, and was admitted to the bar in 1894. In 1899, he ran on the Independent Labor, Republican, and other minor parties', tickets for the New York City Court but was defeated by the Tammany Hall candidate. In 1901, Seabury ran again for the City Court, this time on the Citizens Union ticket, and was elected to a ten-year term.

Seabury initially ran for a seat on the New York City Board of Aldermen during the 1897 election, but withdrew in order to focus on supporting Henry George's mayoral campaign. Seabury was elected to the city court in 1901, being the youngest judge at age 28.

In 1905, Seabury ran for the New York Supreme Court (actually a trial court) on the Municipal Ownership League ticket headed by William Randolph Hearst for Mayor, but was defeated. In 1906, he ran again, this time on the Democratic and Independence League fusion ticket headed by Hearst for Governor, and was elected to a fourteen-year term.

In 1913, Seabury ran on the Progressive ticket for the New York Court of Appeals, the state's highest court, but was defeated. The following year, he ran again, this time on the Democratic, Progressive, Independence League, and American tickets, and was elected to a fourteen-year term, becoming the only Democrat elected that year. On December 8, 1914, Seabury was appointed to the Court of Appeals three weeks before his elective term would begin, to fill the vacancy caused by the death of William B. Hornblower.

Theodore Roosevelt opposed incumbent Governor Charles S. Whitman and convinced Seabury to run in the 1916 gubernatorial election. Franklin D. Roosevelt supported Seabury and helped him win the Democratic nomination. However, Theodore did not obtain the Progressive nomination for him, causing Seabury to state that "Mr. President, you are a blaitherskite". He also failed to receive the support of Tammany Hall. Whitman defeated Seabury in the election.

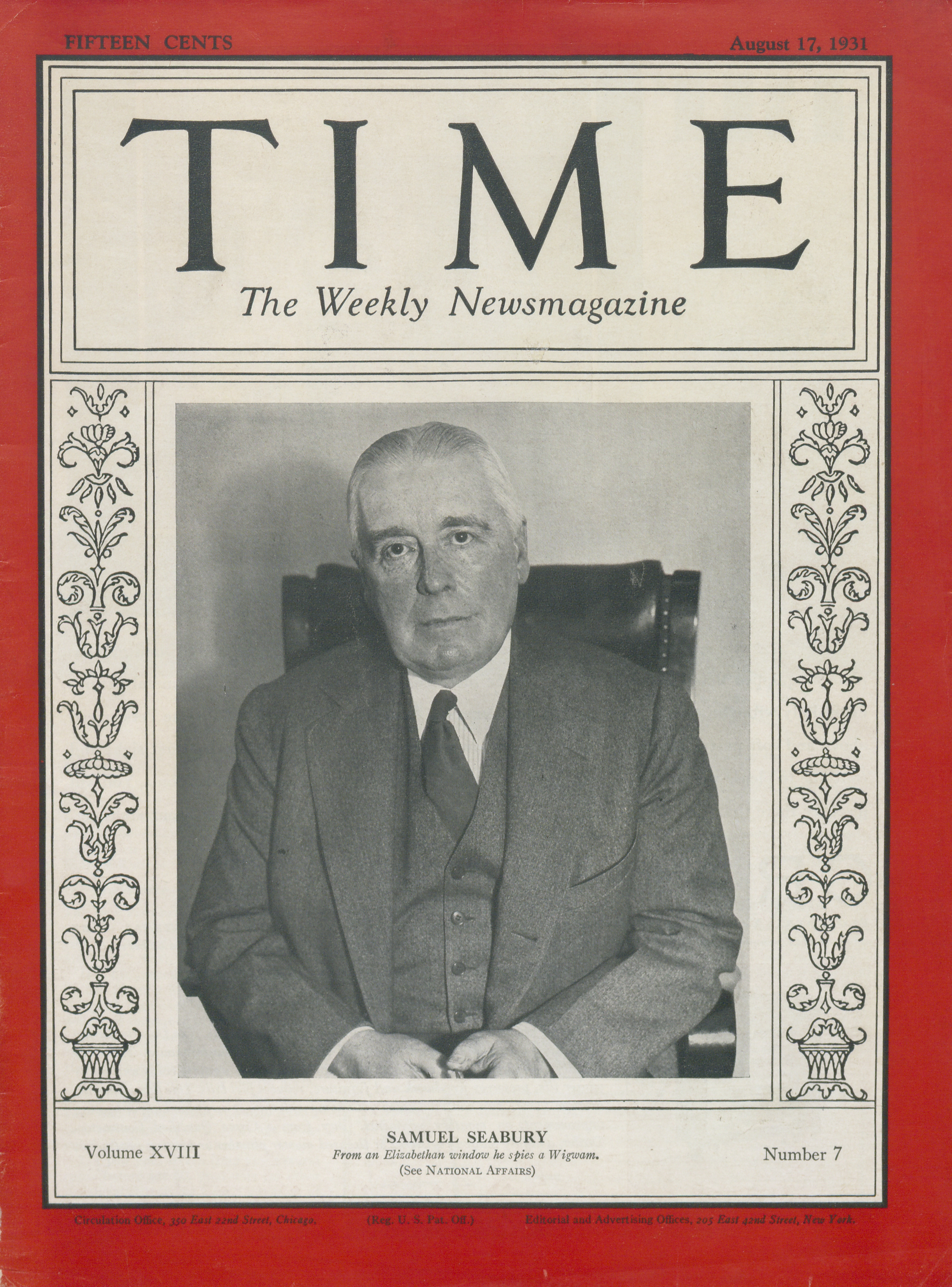
Seabury on the cover of Time magazine, August 17, 1931

Seabury then resumed his private law practice. Active in the New York City Bar Association with William Nelson Cromwell, Seabury succeeded Cromwell as that organization's president from 1939 to 1941.

In 1930–1932, Seabury became lead investigator of the Hofstadter Committee (sometimes called the Seabury Investigations), a joint legislative committee which investigated corruption in New York's municipal courts and police department and called over a thousand witnesses. Those investigations forced Jimmy Walker out of the office of Mayor of New York City. In 1950, Seabury published The New Federalism, expressing doubts about increasing governmental power.

Seabury innovated a form of proportional representation that NYC adopted for city elections in 1937 and used for several elections. He supplied the foreword to George H. Hallett, Jr.'s 1937 book Proportional Representation, in which he claimed that New York's adoption of proportional representation would do away with gerrymandering, break the monopoly held by the party machine, and secure independence of choice to every voter, and other good things.

In 1950, Seabury published The New Federalism, expressing doubts about increasing governmental power.

== Investigative technique ==
Seabury's chief counsel, Isidore Kresel, pioneered the innovative investigative technique that Seabury used in his investigations of Tammany Hall during the Seabury Commission. This technique has since become standard. Prior to this technique, an investigative commission or committee relied on interviews and public testimony from confessors to inform on decisions and outcomes of investigations. Kresel's method relied, instead, on gathering incredible amounts of facts pertaining to the investigation, including bank account documents, brokerage accounts, leases, title records, and income tax returns, and then using these documents to confront a witness during questioning.

== Death and legacy ==
An invalid for several years, Seabury died at Hand's Nursing Home in East Hampton.

In 1932, Seabury received The Hundred Year Association of New York's Gold Medal Award "in recognition of outstanding contributions to the City of New York."

A park was named to honor Judge Seabury. On the corner of 96th street and Lexington Avenue, it was renovated in 2005–2006.

== Works cited ==
- Kessner, Thomas (1989). Fiorello H. LaGuardia and the Making of Modern New York. McGraw Hill Education. ISBN 0-07-034244-X.

Party political offices
Preceded by Martin H. Glynn	Democratic nominee for Governor of New York; 1916	Succeeded by Al Smith
