= North Eaton, Ohio =

Unincorporated community in Ohio, U.S.

Coordinates: 41°18′48″N 81°58′53″W

North Eaton is an unincorporated community in Lorain County, in the U.S. state of Ohio.

== History ==
The origin of the name North Eaton is obscure; the name may be a transfer from Eaton, New York. A post office called North Eaton was established in 1833, and remained in operation until 1928.
