= National Association of the Motion Picture Industry =

American film organization

The National Association of the Motion Picture Industry (NAMPI) was an American film industry self-regulatory body created by the Hollywood studios in 1916 to answer demands for film censorship by states and municipalities.

== History ==
The system consisted of a series of "Thirteen Points", a list of subjects and storylines they promised to avoid. However, there was no method of enforcement if a studio film violated the Thirteen Points content restrictions. The NAMPI tried to prevent New York from becoming the first state with its own film censorship board in 1921, but failed. NAMPI was ineffective and was replaced when the studios hired Will H. Hays to oversee the film content restrictions in 1922.

== Epidemic response ==
In 1918, the Association asked New York City Health Commissioner Royal S. Copeland to forward to them his observations regarding any relation between the motion picture theaters and the influenza epidemic in New York. Dr. Copeland had decided to permit the motion picture theaters to remain open. Nonetheless, in as much as two-thirds of movie houses had been closed by local boards of health, the Association decided to halt the release of new features.

== See also ==
- Film censorship in the United States
