= Edward Schoeneck =

American politician (1875–1951)

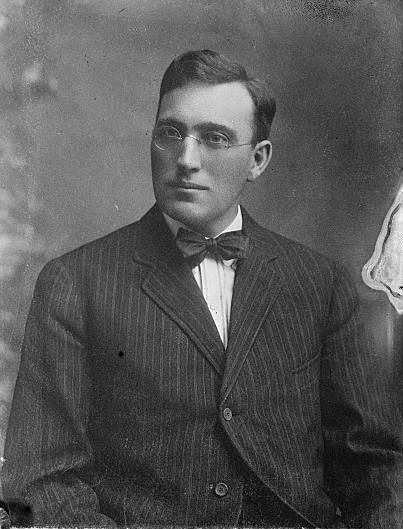
Schoeneck c. 1910

Edward Schoeneck (August 1, 1875 in Syracuse, Onondaga County, New York – June 22, 1951 in Syracuse, Onondaga County, New York) was an American lawyer and politician. He was the lieutenant governor of New York from 1915 to 1918.

== Life ==
He studied law at Syracuse University and was admitted to the bar in 1903. In 1902, he was elected to the Board of Supervisors of Onondaga County. He was a member of the New York State Assembly (Onondaga Co., 2nd D.) in 1904, 1905, 1906 and 1907. He was Mayor of Syracuse from 1910 to 1913.

In 1910, he ran for Lieutenant Governor on the ticket with Henry Lewis Stimson, but was defeated. He was Lieutenant Governor of New York from 1915 to 1918, elected on the Republican ticket in 1914 and 1916 with Governor Charles S. Whitman, but both were defeated for re-election in 1918.

He was a delegate to the New York State Convention to ratify the 21st Amendment in 1933.

== Sources ==
- "Schneiderham to Schroder". Index to Politicians. PoliticalGraveyard.com.
- Rines, George Edwin, ed. (1920). "Schoeneck, Edward" . Encyclopedia Americana.

Party political offices
Preceded by Horace White	Republican nominee for Lieutenant Governor of New York; 1910	Succeeded by James W. Wadsworth Jr.
Preceded by James W. Wadsworth Jr.	Republican nominee for Lieutenant Governor of New York; 1914, 1916, 1918	Succeeded by Jeremiah Wood
New York State Assembly
Preceded by Frederick D. Traub	New York State Assembly; Onondaga County, 2nd District; 1904–1906	Succeeded by Fred W. Hammond
Preceded by Charles H. Gregory	New York State Assembly; Onondaga County, 1st District; 1907	Succeeded by John C. McLaughlin
Political offices
Preceded by Robert F. Wagner; Acting	Lieutenant Governor of New York; 1915–1918	Succeeded by Harry C. Walker
