= Forestdale (agency) =

Non-profit foster care agency

Forestdale, Inc. is a non-profit agency that provides foster care, preventive and other family services in New York City. It is located in the Forest Hills section of Queens.

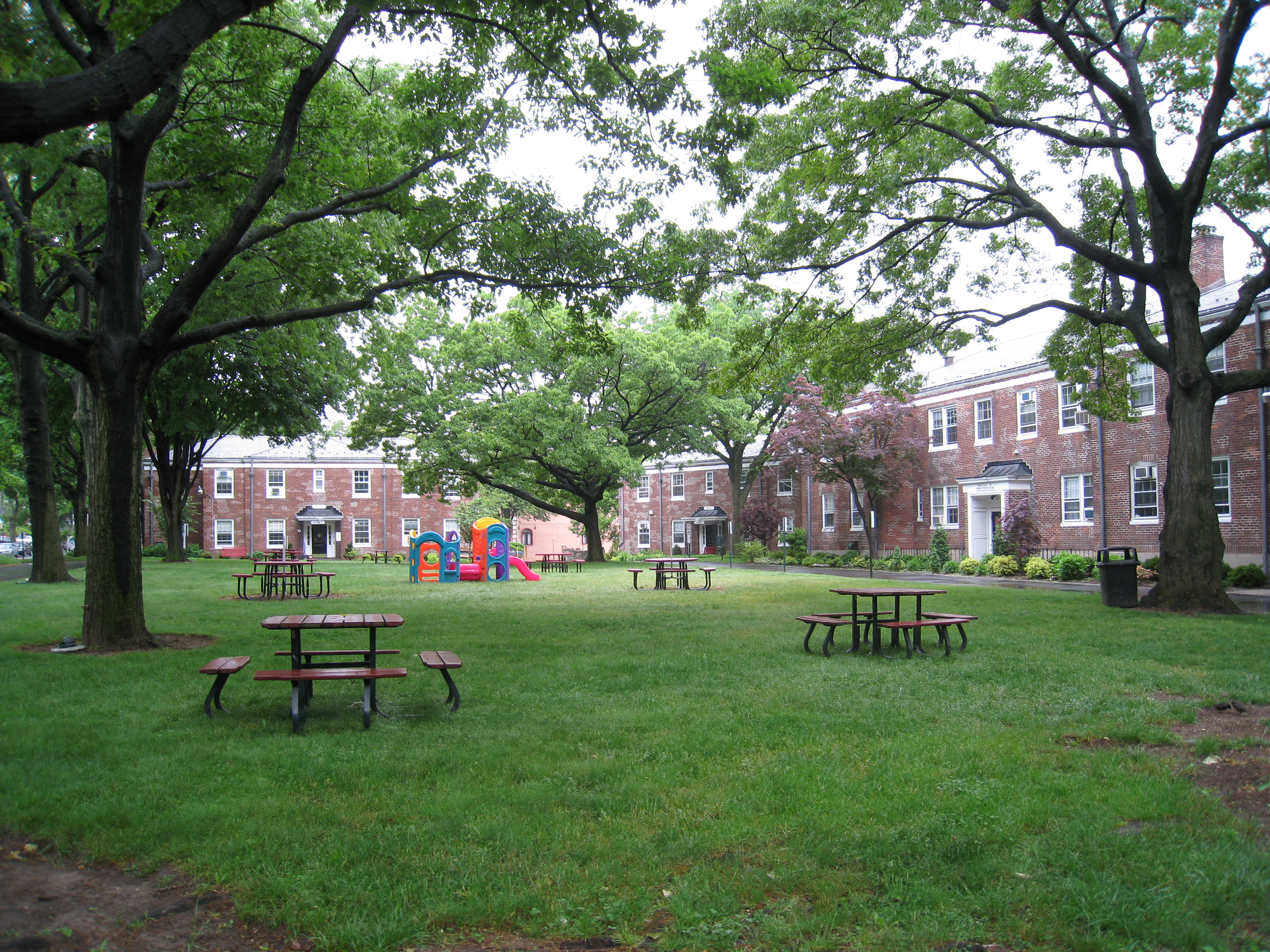
View of the Forestdale grounds

Forestdale receives support and oversight from the New York City Administration for Children's Services (ACS).

Forestdale sponsors the Fathering Initiative, a program for fathers who want to take an active role in their children’s lives. The Fathering Initiative provides parenting classes, links to education and job resources, and individual counseling. It is funded by the New York City Department of Youth and Community Development, with additional support from private foundations, including the National Fatherhood Initiative.

== History ==
Forestdale is the descendant of the Brooklyn Industrial School Association and Home for Destitute Children, which was founded in 1854. The goal of the Industrial School was to teach poor children basic trade skills. By 1880 the organization ran five separate schools in neighborhoods including Brooklyn Heights, Williamsburg, and Bedford-Stuyvesant.

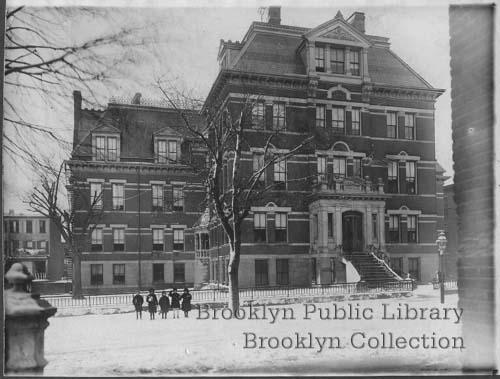
Brooklyn Industrial School and Home for Destitute Children, 1915. From the Brooklyn Collection of the Brooklyn Public Library

In the late 19th century, shifting immigration patterns and the emergence of the public school system led to the closing of the Industrial Schools. The organization changed its name to the Brooklyn Home for Children, and focused on providing residential care for abused and abandoned children.

The Brooklyn Home for Children was one of many New York City orphanages to participate in the Orphan Train movement, in which orphaned children were sent to the Western United States, usually to live with rural families.

In 1941, the Brooklyn Home for Children was bequeathed a parcel of land in Forest Hills, Queens to construct a five-building residential campus. That same year, the agency launched its foster boarding home program. In 1980, the agency closed its residential program to focus on foster care and adoption and eight years later changed its name to Forestdale.
