= Samuel Seabury (1801–1872) =

American Episcopal clergyman

Samuel Seabury (1801–1872) was an American Protestant Episcopal clergyman, grandson of Bishop Samuel Seabury. He was born at New London, Connecticut, was ordained priest in the Protestant Episcopal church (1828), was editor of The Churchman (1833–1849), rector of the Church of the Annunciation in New York City (1838–1868), and professor of biblical learning in the General Theological Seminary (1862–1872). He published:

- The Continuity of the Church of England in the Sixteenth Century (1853)
- Supremacy and Obligation of Conscience (1860)
- American Slavery Justified (1861)
- The Theory and Use of the Church Calendar (1872)
- Discourses on the Holy Spirit (edited by his son, with memoir, 1874)

He married Mary Anna Schuyler, daughter of Samuel Jones (Chancellor of the State of New York). Both Seabury and his wife are buried in Trinity Church Cemetery and Mausoleum in Manhattan.

== See also ==
- William Jones Seabury
