= 1911 United States Senate election in New York =

- January 17–March 31, 1911

201 members of the New York Assembly 101 votes needed to win
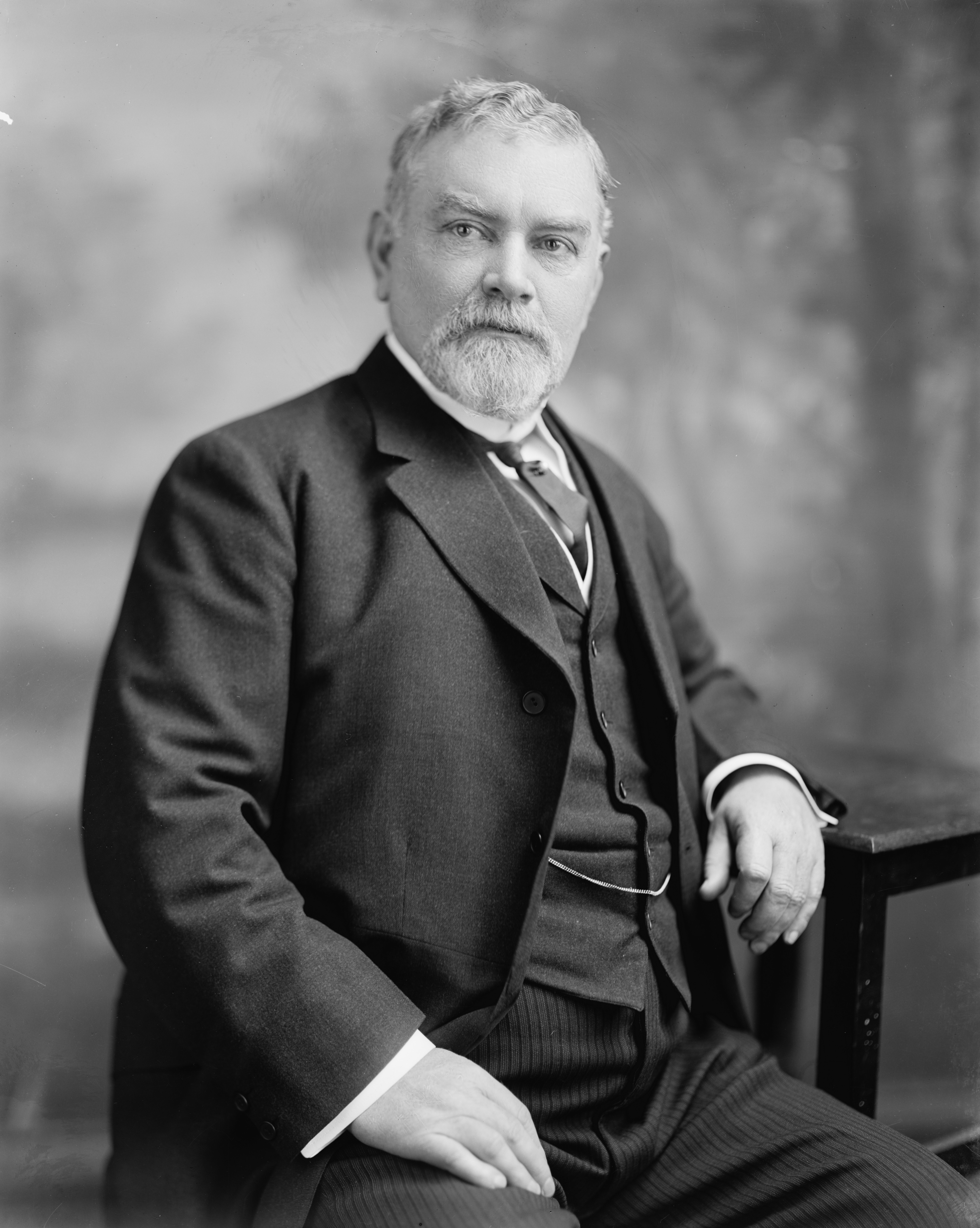

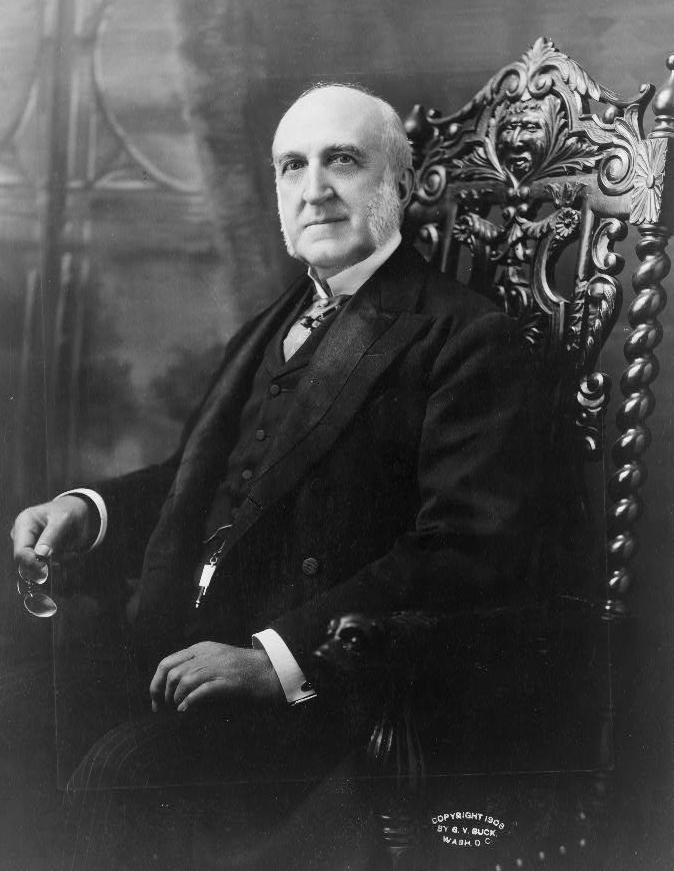
Nominee	James A. O'Gorman	Chauncey Depew
Party	Democratic	Republican
Electoral vote	112	80
Percentage	58.33%	41.67%
Senator before election
Chauncey Depew
Republican
Elected Senator
James A. O'Gorman
Democratic

The 1911 United States Senate election in New York was held from January 17 to March 31, 1911, by the New York State Legislature to elect a U.S. Senator to represent the State of New York in the United States Senate.

The initial Democratic choice for Senator, former Lieutenant Governor William F. Sheehan, was defeated. Although Sheehan had the support of Tammany Hall, insurgent Democratic legislators led by State Senator Franklin Delano Roosevelt revolted against the machine and deadlocked balloting until March. The Roosevelt faction forced a second Democratic caucus in late March to nominate Judge James A. O'Gorman, who was elected on March 31.

== Background ==
Republican Chauncey M. Depew had been re-elected to this seat in 1905, and his term would expire on March 3, 1911.

In the 1910 state election, 29 Democrats, 21 Republicans and 1 Independence Senators were elected for a two-year term (1911–1912), along with 86 Democrats, 63 Republicans and 1 Independence Leaguer were elected for the session of 1911 to the Assembly. The 134th New York State Legislature met from January 4 to October 6, 1911, at Albany, New York.

== Candidates ==
=== First Democratic caucus ===
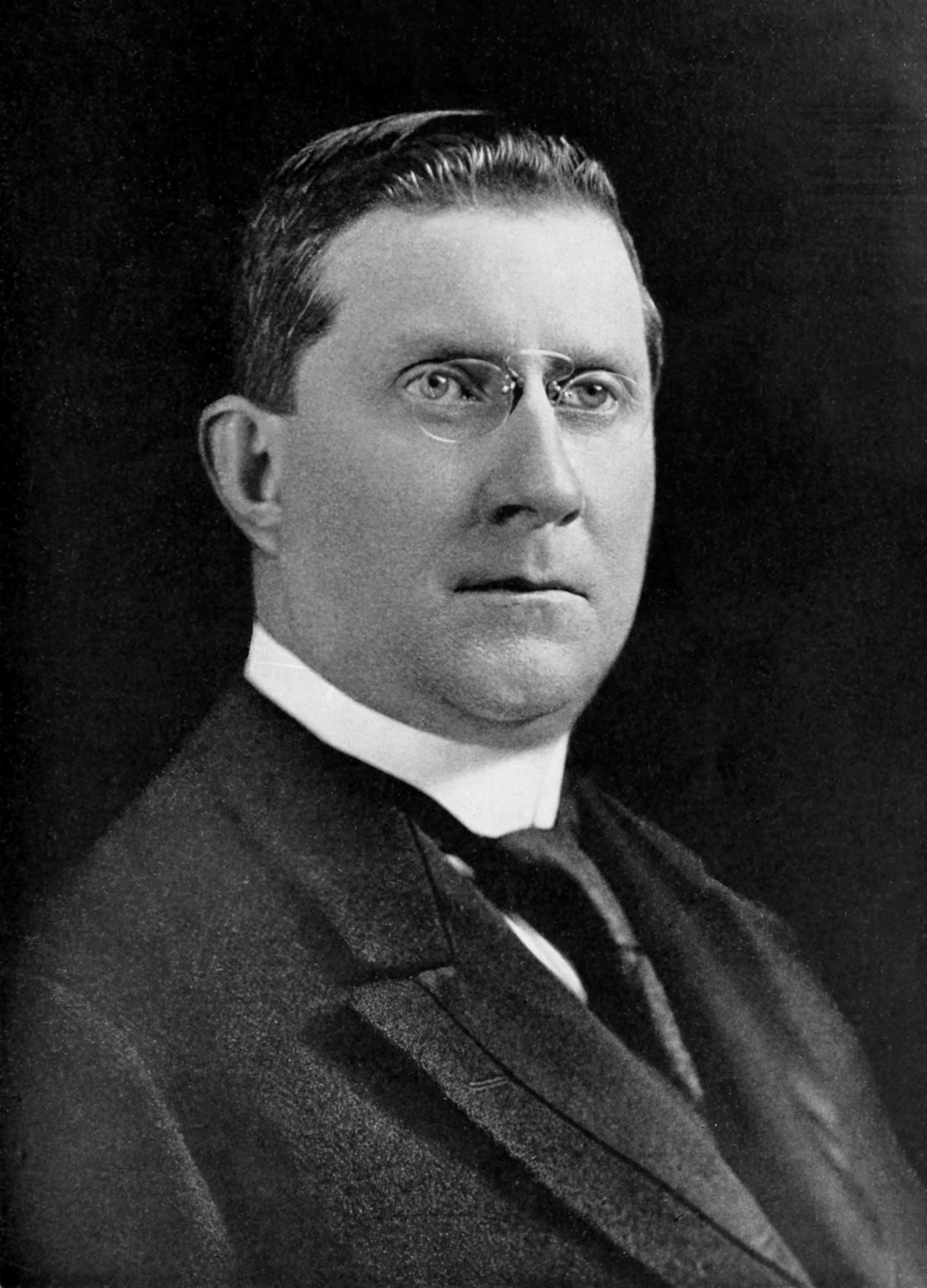
Boss Murphy, leader of Tammany Hall

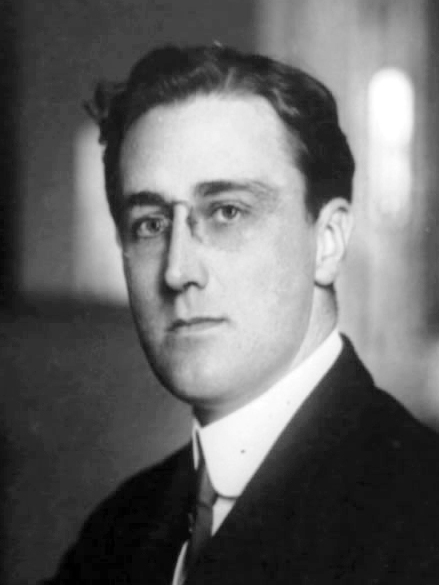
Franklin Roosevelt, leader of the Insurgent faction

Ex-Lieutenant Governor William F. Sheehan announced his candidature formally in a letter to Mayor of Buffalo Louis P. Fuhrmann which was published on December 30, 1910. Before the State election, when a Democratic victory seemed to be improbable, Sheehan had made an agreement with Tammany Hall leader Charles Francis Murphy that the Tammany men would support Sheehan for the U.S. Senate.

The Democratic caucus met on January 16. 91 State legislators attended, but 25 were absent. Speaker Daniel D. Frisbie presided. The caucus nominated Sheehan. Edward M. Shepard, the defeated Democratic candidate for Mayor of New York in the election of 1901; and Ex-Supreme Court Justice D. Cady Herrick, the defeated Democratic candidate for Governor of New York in the election of 1904, also received votes at this caucus.

At the same time, an anti-Sheehan faction (in the press referred to as "the Insurgents") of 19 State legislators met at the Hampton Hotel, led by State Senator Franklin D. Roosevelt and issued a statement repudiating to take part in a caucus which follows orders from non-member political bosses.

1911 First Democratic caucus for United States Senator result
Candidate	First ballot
√ William F. Sheehan	√ 62
Edward M. Shepard	22
D. Cady Herrick	7

=== Republican caucus ===
The Republican caucus met on January 16. They re-nominated the incumbent U.S. Senator Chauncey M. Depew unanimously.

== Election proceedings ==
=== Deadlock ===
On January 17, both houses of the state legislature took ballots separately, but no choice was made in either. Sheehan received the votes of the 91 caucus attendees, only 1 short for a nomination in the state senate, and 8 short in the Assembly. On January 18, the state legislature met in joint session, compared the votes of the previous day, found that no choice was made, and proceeded to a joint ballot. On the joint ballot, Assemblyman Lewis S. Chanler, who had been lieutenant governor from 1907 to 1908, and the defeated Democratic candidate for the U.S. Senate in the election of 1909, deserted Sheehan, who received 90 votes, 9 short of election. As no choice was made, joint ballots continued to be taken every day, Monday through Saturday, at noon. Governor of New York John Alden Dix refused to interfere in the contest, but continued to talk privately to Mayor of New York William J. Gaynor, Boss Murphy and a few prospective compromise candidates.

On February 7, after the 18th ballot, the majority leaders, Robert F. Wagner of the state senate and Al Smith of the Assembly, called a conference for the next morning at which both factions would discuss the further proceedings. Both factions met on February 8, maintained their positions, and nothing came of it. About this time, Edward M. Shepard was taken seriously ill, and he would die a few months later.

On February 20, after the 28th ballot, Congressman Martin W. Littleton announced formally his candidature for the senatorship. Littleton had received a few scattering votes throughout the balloting, but nothing came of it.

On February 23, after the 31st ballot, a letter was received from Congressman William Sulzer stating that, if a compromise candidate was sought, he would take the senatorship. Sulzer had received a few scattering votes since the 11th ballot, but nothing came of it either.

On February 25, after the 34th ballot, Edward M. Shepard withdrew from the contest and advised the election of a compromise candidate. Most of the Insurgents then voted for two ballots for John D. Kernan, and then for Littleton.

On February 28, after the 36th ballot, Sheehan sent an open letter to the State legislators in which he declared himself for a new caucus, and his acceptance of any candidate the caucus would choose. The Insurgents answered that a new caucus was useless.

On March 3, after the 39th ballot, Governor Dix advised to abandon Sheehan, and instead to elect immediately someone "whose choice will unite the Democratic Party." Sheehan however refused to withdraw from the contest unless a new caucus chose another candidate, and none of the legislators followed Dix's advice.

On the same day, the term of the incumbent Chauncey M. Depew ended, and the seat became vacant on March 4.

=== Late election ===
President William H. Taft called a special session of the U.S. Senate to convene on April 4, and all parties expressed their hope that a U.S. Senator be elected by then.

On March 7, after the 42nd ballot, Mayor Gaynor seconded Gov. Dix, and advised to abandon Sheehan. Boss Murphy however re-affirmed his support for Sheehan, and the deadlock continued as before.

Intense negotiations followed to make the way clear for a new caucus. On March 18, Boss Murphy consented to a new caucus if the Insurgents accepted the candidate chosen, whoever it be. State Senator Roosevelt refused to be led into this trap, and on March 20 told Gov. Dix that the Insurgents would not be bound by the new caucus choice, expecting the Tammany majority to nominate somebody as objectionable as Sheehan, like Daniel F. Cohalan, De Lancey Nicoll or John B. Stanchfield. On March 22, after the 55th ballot, a conference of all Democratic legislators met and agreed unanimously to call a new caucus for March 27, to reconsider the nomination made on January 16.

=== Results, up to 58th ballot ===
1911 United States Senator (Class 1) election result
Candidate	Party	Senate Jan 17	Assembly Jan 17	Joint ballot Jan 18	2nd joint ballot Jan 19	3rd joint ballot Jan 20	4th joint ballot Jan 21	5th joint ballot Jan 23	6th joint ballot Jan 24	7th joint ballot Jan 25	8th joint ballot Jan 26	9th joint ballot Jan 27
William F. Sheehan	Democratic	25	66	90	88	60	18	86	85	85	82	20
Chauncey M. Depew	Republican	20	59	80	81	52	10	81	80	79	77	12
Edward M. Shepard	Democratic	2	12	13	13	11	11	13	11	11	10	9
Alton B. Parker	Democratic	—	6	7	7	3	2	1	1	1	1	1
James W. Gerard	Democratic	1	1	3	2	2	—	2	2	2	2	2
D. Cady Herrick	Democratic	1	1	2	2	3	3	3	1	1	1	—
Martin W. Littleton	Democratic	1	1	2	2	2	3	3	3	3	3	3
John D. Kernan	Democratic	—	—	—	2	4	4	4	4	4	5	7
Morgan J. O'Brien	Democratic	—	—	—	1	1	1	1	2	2	2	2
Martin H. Glynn	Democratic	—	—	—	—	2	2	1	1	1	1	1
Simon W. Rosendale	Democratic	—	—	—	—	1	—	—	—	—	—	—
John Alden Dix	Democratic	—	—	—	—	—	—	1	1	1	1	1
Curtis N. Douglas	Democratic	—	—	—	—	—	—	—	3	3	1	—
Seymour Van Santvoord	Democratic	—	—	—	—	—	—	—	—	—	1	2
John C. R. Taylor	Democratic	—	—	—	—	—	—	—	—	—	1	1

1911 United States Senator (Class 1) election result
Candidate	Party	10th joint ballot Jan 28	11th joint ballot Jan 30	12th joint ballot Jan 31	13th joint ballot Feb 1	14th joint ballot Feb 2	15th joint ballot Feb 3	16th joint ballot Feb 4	17th joint ballot Feb 6	18th joint ballot Feb 7	19th joint ballot Feb 8	20th joint ballot Feb 9	21st joint ballot Feb 10
William F. Sheehan	Democratic	9	67	82	82	69	14	7	66	85	86	75	8
Chauncey M. Depew	Republican	4	61	74	77	64	11	5	59	81	80	72	4
Edward M. Shepard	Democratic	5	10	10	10	10	7	2	9	10	10	10	4
John D. Kernan	Democratic	4	7	9	9	9	8	2	9	9	9	8	2
Martin W. Littleton	Democratic	3	3	3	3	3	2	1	3	3	3	3	2
Morgan J. O'Brien	Democratic	2	2	2	2	2	2	—	2	2	2	2	1
Seymour Van Santvoord	Democratic	2	2	—	—	—	—	—	—	—	—	—	—
Martin H. Glynn	Democratic	1	3	3	3	3	3	2	3	3	3	3	1
Alton B. Parker	Democratic	1	1	1	1	1	—	—	1	1	1	1	1
James W. Gerard	Democratic	1	—	—	—	—	—	—	—	—	—	—	—
John C. R. Taylor	Democratic	—	1	1	1	1	1	—	1	1	1	1	—
William Sulzer	Democratic	—	1	1	1	1	—	—	1	1	1	2	2
George L. Rives	Democratic	—	—	—	—	—	—	—	—	—	—	—	1
J. Hampden Dougherty	Democratic	—	—	—	—	—	—	—	—	—	—	—	1

1911 United States Senator (Class 1) election result
Candidate	Party	22nd joint ballot Feb 11	23rd joint ballot Feb 13	24th joint ballot Feb 14	25th joint ballot Feb 15	26th joint ballot Feb 16	27th joint ballot Feb 17	28th joint ballot Feb 18	29th joint ballot Feb 20	30th joint ballot Feb 21	31st joint ballot Feb 22	32nd joint ballot Feb 23	33rd joint ballot Feb 24
William F. Sheehan	Democratic	5	7	81	81	76	15	5	47	78	79	66	11
Chauncey M. Depew	Republican	2	2	71	72	66	7	4	44	76	73	60	4
Edward M. Shepard	Democratic	2	4	9	3	4	—	1	3	4	12	15	10
William Sulzer	Democratic	1	2	3	3	3	2	—	3	3	3	3	2
Martin W. Littleton	Democratic	1	1	3	3	3	3	1	3	3	3	3	2
Martin H. Glynn	Democratic	1	1	3	3	2	1	—	1	1	1	1	1
J. Hampden Dougherty	Democratic	1	1	1	1	1	1	—	—	1	—	—	—
George L. Rives	Democratic	1	—	—	—	—	—	—	—	—	—	—	—
John D. Kernan	Democratic	—	2	6	15	14	10	5	13	13	4	1	1
George F. Peabody	Democratic	—	1	1	—	—	—	—	—	—	—	—	—
Morgan J. O'Brien	Democratic	—	—	1	1	1	1	—	1	2	2	1	1
Alton B. Parker	Democratic	—	—	1	1	1	—	—	1	1	1	1	—
John C. R. Taylor	Democratic	—	—	1	—	—	—	—	—	—	—	—	—
Herman N. Hansen	Ind. League	—	—	—	—	1	1	1	—	—	—	—	—
John J. Hopper	Ind. League	—	—	—	—	—	—	—	2	2	2	2	1
John N. Carlisle	Democratic	—	—	—	—	—	—	—	—	—	1	1	—

1911 United States Senator (Class 1) election result
Candidate	Party	34th joint ballot Feb 25	35th joint ballot Feb 27	36th joint ballot Feb 28	37th joint ballot Mar 1	38th joint ballot Mar 2	39th joint ballot Mar 3	40th joint ballot Mar 4	41st joint ballot Mar 6	42nd joint ballot Mar 7	43rd joint ballot Mar 8	44th joint ballot Mar 9	45th joint ballot Mar 10	46th joint ballot Mar 11
William F. Sheehan	Democratic	5	9	80	77	66	9	6	6	80	79	65	3	2
Chauncey M. Depew	Republican	—	4	75	71	59	3	2	2	74	75	57	4	1
Edward M. Shepard	Democratic	2	—	—	—	—	—	—	—	—	—	—	—	—
Martin W. Littleton	Democratic	1	4	7	18	18	13	3	14	18	17	16	9	1
John J. Hopper	Ind. League	1	1	2	1	1	1	1	1	2	2	2	1	—
John D. Kernan	Democratic	—	10	11	—	1	1	—	—	—	—	1	—	—
Morgan J. O'Brien	Democratic	—	2	2	3	3	2	1	1	4	4	4	1	—
William Sulzer	Democratic	—	2	2	2	2	2	—	2	2	2	2	1	—
John N. Carlisle	Democratic	—	1	1	1	1	1	—	1	—	1	1	1	1
Martin H. Glynn	Democratic	—	1	1	1	—	1	1	—	1	1	1	1	—
J. Hampden Dougherty	Democratic	—	1	1	—	—	—	—	—	—	—	—	—	—
Edward M. Grout	Democratic	—	1	1	—	—	—	—	—	—	—	—	—	—
Thomas F. Conway	Democratic	—	1	—	—	—	—	—	—	—	—	—	—	—
Simon W. Rosendale	Democratic	—	1	—	—	—	—	—	—	—	—	—	—	—
Alton B. Parker	Democratic	—	—	1	1	1	—	—	—	1	1	1	—	—
Edward Lazansky	Democratic	—	—	—	1	1	—	—	—	—	—	—	—	—
Luke D. Stapleton	Democratic	—	—	—	—	1	1	—	—	—	—	—	—	—
Isaac M. Kapper	Democratic	—	—	—	—	—	—	—	1	1	1	1	—	—
Thomas M. Mulry	Democratic	—	—	—	—	—	—	—	1	—	—	—	—	—
Herman Ridder	Democratic	—	—	—	—	—	—	—	—	1	1	1	—	—

1911 United States Senator (Class 1) election result
Candidate	Party	47th joint ballot Mar 13	48th joint ballot Mar 14	49th joint ballot Mar 15	50th joint ballot Mar 16	51st joint ballot Mar 17	52nd joint ballot Mar 18	53rd joint ballot Mar 20	54th joint ballot Mar 21	55th joint ballot Mar 22	56th joint ballot Mar 23	57th joint ballot Mar 24	58th joint ballot Mar 25
William F. Sheehan	Democratic	7	74	78	64	7	2	3	78	81	63	5	3
Chauncey M. Depew	Republican	1	69	73	56	2	2	2	69	74	53	1	1
Martin W. Littleton	Democratic	6	18	11	12	3	1	4	11	10	7	1	1
Morgan J. O'Brien	Democratic	1	4	4	3	1	1	2	5	4	4	1	—
John D. Kernan	Democratic	3	2	6	7	5	1	3	7	9	10	3	1
John J. Hopper	Ind. League	1	2	2	1	—	—	—	2	2	2	1	1
William Sulzer	Democratic	1	2	1	—	—	—	1	1	1	1	1	—
Martin H. Glynn	Democratic	1	1	1	1	1	—	—	1	1	1	1	—
John N. Carlisle	Democratic	1	—	1	1	—	—	1	1	1	1	1	1
J. Hampden Dougherty	Democratic	1	—	—	—	—	—	—	—	—	—	—	—
Alton B. Parker	Democratic	—	1	1	1	—	—	—	1	1	1	—	—
David A. Boody	Democratic	—	—	—	—	—	—	1	—	1	1	1	—
Thomas Carmody	Democratic	—	—	—	—	—	—	1	—	—	—	—	—
Augustus Thomas	—	—	—	—	—	—	—	—	—	—	—	1	—
Joseph D. Baucus	Democratic	—	—	—	—	—	—	—	—	—	—	1	—

=== Second Democratic caucus ===
In the morning of March 27, before the 59th ballot, State Senator Edgar T. Brackett, the Republican minority leader, tried to articulate a combination of Republicans and Insurgents to elect an independent Democrat, but was opposed by Edwin A. Merritt, the Republican minority leader in the Assembly, and the offer was turned down by State Senator Roosevelt.

The second Democratic caucus met on the evening of March 27, after the 59th ballot. President pro tempore of the State Senate Robert F. Wagner presided. 90 State legislators attended, among them only 4 Insurgents. Sheehan received 28 votes, and the remainder was scattered among 24 other men, but none for the Insurgents' frontrunner Martin W. Littleton. The caucus then adjourned to meet again on the next evening.

In the morning of March 28, before the 60th ballot, Chauncey M. Depew sent a telegram from Washington, D.C. releasing the Republican State legislators from their caucus pledges, and Merritt now voiced his support of the coalition scheme. Brackett announced that the Republicans would meet in a conference to consider the combination with the Insurgents.

The Democratic caucus met again in the evening of March 28, after the 60th ballot. Four ballots were taken, with no choice, and the caucus adjourned in the small hours of March 29 until the next morning. An hour after the adjournment, a fire broke out in the Assembly library which consumed the west wing of the New York State Capitol. The State Legislature moved to temporary accommodations in the Albany City Hall.

The Republican conference met in the morning of March 29, before the 61st ballot, but many legislators did not appear and no action was taken. Besides, taking the fire as an excuse, most Republicans paired with regular Democrats and went home, so that no quorum was present at the joint sessions of March 29 and 30.

The Democratic caucus met again on March 29, after the 61st ballot, but did not take any vote. State Senator Roosevelt led an Insurgent committee which informed the caucus attendees that, unless one of the names on a list submitted earlier (with the names of Herrick, Gerard, Straus, Glynn, Littleton, Dowling, Van Wyck, Parker, Kernan, Ridder and Carlisle) would be chosen, the Insurgents and Republicans would elect John D. Kernan on the next joint ballot of the state legislature.

On March 30, the announced coalition did not materialize. Despite the Republican leaders supporting the scheme, most legislators did not attend the joint session. Besides, the Democratic caucus did not meet again, the negotiations continued only behind the scenes.

On March 31, Boss Murphy proposed James A. O'Gorman, a justice of the New York Supreme Court whose name had never been mentioned until the first meeting of the second caucus when O'Gorman received a single vote on the first ballot. After some debate, the Insurgents accepted O'Gorman. Thereupon the caucus met again, and 14 Insurgents attended, but Roosevelt did not. O'Gorman was nominated, and the state legislature was convened in the evening to elect him. Thus ended the longest legislative deadlock in New York history after 74 days.

1911 Second Democratic caucus for United States Senator result
Candidate	1st ballot Mar 27	2nd ballot Mar 28	3rd ballot Mar 28	4th ballot Mar 28	5th ballot Mar 28/29	6th ballot Mar 31
William F. Sheehan	28	27	27	26	26	23
Augustus Van Wyck	7	8	8	8	8	1
John J. Fitzgerald	6	6	6	6	6	—
Isidor Straus	5	5	5	12	12	5
John D. Kernan	4	4	4	4	4	3
Theodore Sutro	4	1	1	1	1	—
Daniel F. Cohalan	4	1	1	1	1	—
James W. Gerard	3	4	4	3	3	—
William Sulzer	3	3	3	3	3	1
Herman Ridder	3	2	2	2	2	—
D. Cady Herrick	3	1	3	1	1	4
James A. Renwick	3	—	—	—	—	—
Joseph A. Goulden	2	6	5	—	—	—
Morgan J. O'Brien	2	2	2	2	2	—
William Bruce Ellison	2	2	2	1	1	—
Victor J. Dowling	2	2	2	1	1	—
√ James A. O'Gorman	1	1	1	2	2	√ 63
Francis B. Harrison	1	1	1	1	1	—
John B. Stanchfield	1	1	1	1	1	—
Edward M. Grout	1	1	1	1	1	—
Edward E. McCall	1	1	1	1	1	—
Samuel Untermyer	1	1	1	1	1	—
John Alden Dix	1	1	1	1	1	—
Alton B. Parker	1	—	—	—	—	1
John Lynn	1	—	—	—	—	—
John Anderson Leach	—	3	3	3	3	—
Thomas M. Mulry	—	1	1	1	1	—
J. M. Levy	—	1	1	1	1	—
Martin H. Glynn	—	—	—	1	1	—
Edward A. Richards	—	—	—	—	1	—

=== Election results, 59th through 64th ballot ===
1911 United States Senator (Class 1) election result
Candidate	Party	59th joint ballot Mar 27	60th joint ballot Mar 28	61st joint ballot Mar 29	62nd joint ballot Mar 30	63rd joint ballot Mar 31 noon	64th joint ballot Mar 31 5 p.m.
Martin W. Littleton	Democratic	17	22	2	3	—	—
William F. Sheehan	Democratic	16	28	4	6	7	—
Chauncey M. Depew	Republican	11	80	7	11	14	80
Morgan J. O'Brien	Democratic	3	4	1	1	1	—
Martin H. Glynn	Democratic	2	—	—	1	1	—
John D. Kernan	Democratic	1	4	23	12	5	—
Alton B. Parker	Democratic	1	1	—	—	—	—
John J. Hopper	Ind. League	1	—	—	—	—	—
John N. Carlisle	Democratic	1	—	—	3	1	—
Augustus Van Wyck	Democratic	—	7	1	3	2	—
Joseph A. Goulden	Democratic	—	6	—	—	—	—
John J. Fitzgerald	Democratic	—	6	—	—	—	—
Isidor Straus	Democratic	—	5	2	9	9	—
James W. Gerard	Democratic	—	4	1	2	—	—
Herman Ridder	Democratic	—	3	1	—	1	—
Victor J. Dowling	Democratic	—	3	1	—	1	—
William Sulzer	Democratic	—	3	—	1	1	—
William Bruce Ellison	Democratic	—	3	—	1	—	—
James A. Renwick	Democratic	—	3	—	—	—	—
Theodore Sutro	Democratic	—	3	—	—	—	—
D. Cady Herrick	Democratic	—	2	3	4	11	—
√ James A. O'Gorman	Democratic	—	1	—	—	3	√ 112
Francis B. Harrison	Democratic	—	1	—	—	—	—
John B. Stanchfield	Democratic	—	1	—	—	—	—
Edward E. McCall	Democratic	—	1	—	—	—	—
Samuel Untermyer	Democratic	—	1	—	—	—	—
John Alden Dix	Democratic	—	1	—	—	—	—
Frank S. Black	Republican	—	1	—	—	—	—
Daniel F. Cohalan	Democratic	—	1	—	—	1	—
Edward M. Grout	Democratic	—	1	—	—	—	—
John Lynn	Democratic	—	1	—	—	—	—
Charles W. Cosad	Democratic	—	—	—	—	1	—

== Aftermath ==
By becoming a leader of the anti-Tammany legislators almost immediately after his election to the state senate, and having survived ten weeks of what a biographer later described as "the full might of Tammany" against him, Roosevelt achieved his first victory as an elective official. This was the last U.S. senatorial election by the state legislature. The U.S. Constitution was amended soon after, and since 1914 U.S. Senators have been elected statewide by popular ballot. O'Gorman took his seat on April 4, 1911, and served a single term, remaining in the U.S. Senate until March 3, 1917. In November 1916, Republican William M. Calder was elected to succeed O'Gorman.

== See also ==
- United States Senate elections, 1910 and 1911

== Sources ==
- "Journal of the Assembly (134th Session, 1911; Vol. I". 1911. states results of the vote in the Assembly on pg. 56f, and of the joint ballots through March 28
- "Journal of the Assembly (134th Session, 1911; Vol. II". 1911. states results of joint ballots of March 29 to 31
- "DEMOCRATS CONTROL LEGISLATURE BY 29" (PDF). The New York Times. November 10, 1910.
- "SHEEHAN IS LEADING IN SENATE CONTEST" (PDF). The New York Times. December 31, 1910.
- "SHEEHAN NAMED; 25 BOLT CAUCUS; DEADLOCK NOW" (PDF). The New York Times. January 17, 1911.
- "BLOCK SHEEHAN; … Twenty-one Democrats Pledged Against Him" (PDF). The New York Times. January 18, 1911.
- "REPUBLICAN PLOT TO ELECT SHEEHAN" (PDF). The New York Times. January 19, 1911.
- "THE INSURGENT ROLL OF HONOR" (PDF). The New York Times. January 19, 1911. [This article gives a remarkably early insight into the reasons behind the "Insurgency"; i.e. Franklin D. Roosevelt was determined to follow step by step the career of his relative Theodore Roosevelt. Theodore started his political career as a first-term assemblyman upsetting the party machine, and Franklin did exactly that now. Later, Franklin would be, like Theodore, Asst. Secr. of the Navy, Gov. of New York, and vice presidential candidate, until finally achieving the presidency, his goal which he had set himself in 1910.
- "SHEEHAN LOSES TWO MORE VOTES" (PDF). The New York Times. January 20, 1911.
- "LOOMIS NOW READY TO DESERT SHEEHAN" (PDF). The New York Times. January 21, 1911.
- "SHEEHAN'S FORCES DWINDLING AWAY" (PDF). The New York Times. January 22, 1911.
- "86 SHEEHAN VOTES ON FIFTH BALLOT" (PDF). The New York Times. January 24, 1911.
- "DIX MAY YET END SENATORSHIP FIGHT" (PDF). The New York Times. January 25, 1911.
- "REVOLT IN CAMP OF MURPHY MEN" (PDF). The New York Times. January 26, 1911.
- "EXPECT DARK HORSE TO WIN SENATORSHIP" (PDF). The New York Times. January 27, 1911.
- "LOOK FOR SHEEHAN TO WITHDRAW SOON" (PDF). The New York Times. January 28, 1911.
- "SHEEHAN RELUCTANT TO QUIT SENATE RACE" (PDF). The New York Times. January 29, 1911.
- "MURPHY CONFERS WITH ROOSEVELT" (PDF). The New York Times. January 31, 1911.
- "NO COMPROMISE YET IN SENATE CONTEST" (PDF). The New York Times. February 1, 1911.
- "MURPHY NOT READY TO DESERT SHEEHAN" (PDF). The New York Times. February 2, 1911.
- "SEE AN END SOON TO SENATE FIGHT" (PDF). The New York Times. February 3, 1911.
- "GLYNN OR LITTLETON MAY END DEADLOCK" (PDF). The New York Times. February 4, 1911.
- "TELLS OF MURPHY CONFERENCE" (PDF). The New York Times. February 5, 1911.
- "SHEEHAN AGAIN FAILS TO WIN DIX'S AID.; … SHEPARD SAID TO BE ILL" (PDF). The New York Times. February 7, 1911.
- "SEE AN END TO-DAY IN SENATOR FIGHT" (PDF). The New York Times. February 8, 1911.
- "CONFERENCE FAILS TO BREAK DEADLOCK" (PDF). The New York Times. February 9, 1911.
- "DIX WILL CONSULT GAYNOR TO-MORROW" (PDF). The New York Times. February 10, 1911.
- "DEADLOCKED FOUR WEEKS" (PDF). The New York Times. February 11, 1911.
- "IGNORE SHEEHAN MEETING" (PDF). The New York Times. February 12, 1911.
- "ONLY 21 VOTES FOR SENATOR" (PDF). The New York Times. February 14, 1911.
- "TWENTY-FOURTH ALBANY VOTE" (PDF). The New York Times. February 15, 1911.
- "NO SHEEHAN GAINS AFTER HIS MEETING" (PDF). The New York Times. February 16, 1911.
- "ANOTHER WEEK'S DEADLOCK" (PDF). The New York Times. February 17, 1911.
- "MURPHY MAY YET FORCE SHEEHAN OUT" (PDF). The New York Times. February 18, 1911.
- "105021444" (PDF). The New York Times. February 19, 1911.
- "LITTLETON ENTERS SENATORIAL RACE". The New York Times. February 20, 1911.
- "ASK INVESTIGATION OF SHEEHAN TACTICS" (PDF). The New York Times. February 21, 1911.
- "ASK DIX TO END DEADLOCK" (PDF). The New York Times. February 22, 1911.
- "SHEPARD WON'T QUIT TILL SHEEHAN DOES" (PDF). The New York Times. February 24, 1911.
- "SHEEHAN HOLDS ON IN FACE OF REVOLT" (PDF). The New York Times. February 25, 1911.
- "TO STUMP THE STATE AGAINST SHEEHAN" (PDF). The New York Times. February 26, 1911.
- "MR. SHEPARD'S LETTER.; Withdraws…" (PDF). The New York Times. February 27, 1911.
- "PRESSING SHEEHAN TO QUIT" (PDF). The New York Times. February 28, 1911.
- "SHEEHAN IS FOR A NEW CAUCUS" (PDF). The New York Times. March 1, 1911.
- "SAY NEW CAUCUS IS USELESS" (PDF). The New York Times. March 1, 1911.
- "DIX, WORRIED, HOPES FOR ANOTHER CAUCUS" (PDF). The New York Times. March 2, 1911.
- "DIX AND GAYNOR MAY FORCE MURPHY TO ACT" (PDF). The New York Times. March 3, 1911.
- "DIX NOW SAYS DROP SHEEHAN" (PDF). The New York Times. March 4, 1911.
- "MURPHY STILL HOLDS KEY" (PDF). The New York Times. March 5, 1911.
- "SHEEHAN TELLS DIX HE WON'T WITHDRAW" (PDF). The New York Times. March 6, 1911.
- "ANTI-SHEEHAN BREAK SOON" (PDF). The New York Times. March 7, 1911.
- "TURN AGAINST DIX AS DEADLOGK HOLDS" (PDF). The New York Times. March 8, 1911.
- "GAYNOR UPHOLDS DIX IN FIGHT ON SHEEHAN" (PDF). The New York Times. March 9, 1911.
- "SHEEHAN BOOM NEAR AN UTTER COLLAPSE" (PDF). The New York Times. March 10, 1911.
- "LULL IN SENATORIAL FIGHT" (PDF). The New York Times. March 11, 1911.
- "EXPECT ANOTHER DIX LETTER" (PDF). The New York Times. March 12, 1911.
- "DIX HOPEFUL AFTER TALK WITH MURPHY" (PDF). The New York Times. March 15, 1911.
- "DIX WAITS TO HEAR WHAT MURPHY SAYS" (PDF). The New York Times. March 16, 1911.
- "DECLARES STETSON BACKS INSURGENTS" (PDF). The New York Times. March 17, 1911.
- "JEST AS THEY VOTE IN VAIN FOR SENATOR" (PDF). The New York Times. March 18, 1911.
- "ALBANY LIKES FRISBIE'S STAND" (PDF). The New York Times. March 19, 1911.
- "MURPHY HALTS PLAN TO BREAK DEADLOCK" (PDF). The New York Times. March 21, 1911.
- "NEW CALL GOES OUT TO END SENATE FIGHT" (PDF). The New York Times. March 22, 1911.
- "CAUCUS NEXT MONDAY" (PDF). The New York Times. March 23, 1911.
- "SHEEHAN FIGHTS ON DESPITE NEW CAUCUS" (PDF). The New York Times. March 24, 1911.
- "ALBANY EXPECTS AGREEMENT" (PDF). The New York Times. March 25, 1911.
- "SUDDEN CALL TO LEGISLATORS" (PDF). The New York Times. March 26, 1911.
- "WON'T WITHDRAW, DECLARES SHEEHAN" (PDF). The New York Times. February 27, 1911.
- "SHEEHAN LOSES IN NEW CAUCUS" (PDF). The New York Times. March 28, 1911.
- "CAUCUS AGAIN BALLOTS IN VAIN" (PDF). The New York Times. March 29, 1911.
- "$5,000,000 LOSS IN CAPITOL FIRE; West Wing Wrecked and State Library, with Historic Records, Almost Destroyed" (PDF). The New York Times. March 30, 1911.
- "LIKELY TO ELECT SENATOR TO-DAY" (PDF). The New York Times. March 30, 1911.
- "HITCH IN THE PLANS TO NAME A SENATOR" (PDF). The New York Times. March 31, 1911.
- "NAME O'GORMAN FOR SENATOR" (PDF). The New York Times. April 1, 1911.
