= Edward M. Shepard =

American lawyer (1850–1911)

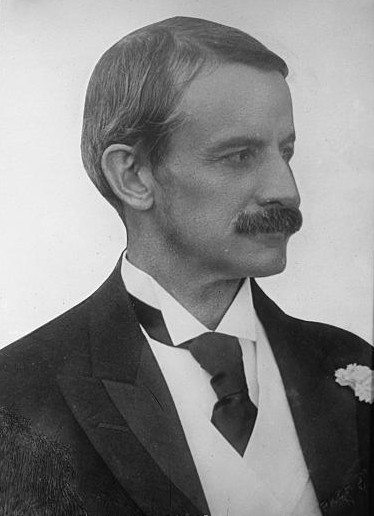
- Shepard, 1910

Personal details
- Born: July 23, 1850 New York City, U.S.
- Died: July 28, 1911 (aged 61) Lake George, Warren County, New York, U.S.
- Party: Democratic
- Relatives: Lorenzo B. Shepard (Father)
- Education: Oberlin College; City College of New York

Edward Morse Shepard (July 23, 1850 – July 28, 1911) was an American lawyer and politician from New York.

== Early life and education ==
Edward M. Shepard was the son of Lorenzo B. Shepard (1821–1856) and Lucy (Morse) Shepard (1821–1890). After the early death of his father, Abram S. Hewitt became his guardian, and the family removed to Brooklyn. There Shepard attended Public School Nr. 13. Afterwards he attended Oberlin College Preparatory School for one year (1860–61), and graduated from City College of New York in 1869. He then studied law with John Edward Parsons, was admitted to the bar in 1875, and formed a partnership with Albert Stickney. In 1890, he became a partner in the firm of Parsons, Shepard and Ogden.

== Political career ==
From 1883 to 1885, he was Chairman of the Brooklyn Civil Service Board. In 1884, he was appointed a State Forestry Commissioner. He became a Democratic leader in Brooklyn, but disagreed with the corrupt local boss Hugh McLaughlin. In 1894, the state convention seated McLaughlin delegates in place of those led by Shepard.

Shepard's "Democratic Reform" faction then nominated Everett P. Wheeler for Governor, in competition with "regular Democrat" David B. Hill. In the election, won by Republican Levi P. Morton, Wheeler got only 2% of the vote.

Shepard was a delegate to the National Convention of the "Gold Democrats" in Indianapolis, which nominated the Palmer/Buckner ticket for the 1896 United States presidential election. In 1897, Shepard supported Seth Low, who ran on the Citizens Union ticket for Mayor of New York City at the first election under the Consolidation Charter. Shepard said that Tammany Hall was the "most burning and disgraceful blot upon the municipal history of this country."

In 1900, Shepard supported William Jennings Bryan for president.

In 1901, despite Shepard's reformist record, Tammany boss Richard Croker had him nominated as the regular Democratic candidate for Mayor. He was defeated by Seth Low, nominated by a fusion of Anti-Tammany Democrats, Republicans, and the Citizens Union.

Mark Twain, an avid supporter of Seth Low, said of Edward M. Shepard: "A Tammany banana is a strange thing. One end of it, or one part, here or there, is perfectly white. The rest of it is rotten. Now, I have the greatest respect for Mr. Shepard personally, but nine-tenths of the rest of the bananas on that ticket are rotten. Mr. Shepard is the white part of the banana. The best we can do is throw the whole banana from us, for it is unfit. It will make us sick."

In 1909, he started a movement to unite the quarreling factions of New York Democrats. This led to success in 1910 elections. John Alden Dix became the first Democratic Governor of New York since Roswell P. Flower had left office in 1894, and the Democrats had majorities in both houses of the New York State Legislature (for the first time since 1893). Shepard had been considered the frontrunner for the gubernatorial nomination, but Tammany boss Charles Francis Murphy preferred Dix.

At the onset of 1911, the Democrats having a majority in the Legislature, it was generally believed that Shepard would be elected US Senator from New York to succeed Republican Chauncey M. Depew. But boss Murphy put up William F. Sheehan for the nomination, and the longest deadlock in the history of New York ensued. Shepard was favored by the "Insurgent" Democrats, led by State Senator Franklin D. Roosevelt. He received 15 votes (out of 200) on the 32nd ballot, but after the 34th ballot, withdrew on 25 February, He urged Sheehan to do the same for the sake of party unity. But Sheehan remained in the field, and after 74 days of deadlock, James A. O'Gorman was elected as a compromise candidate on April 1.

Just a few months later, on July 28, 1911, Shepard died of pneumonia at his summer residence "Erlowest" (now The Inn at Erlowest), on Lake George's "Millionaire's Row." He had never married.

== Association with City College of New York ==
Shepard was a graduate of CCNY, and chairman of the Board of Trustees from 1904 to 1911. At this time, CCNY was building its new "North Campus". Shepard took particular interest in the 2,400-seat Great Hall of the Main Building, supervising its decoration and furnishing. The Main Building was named Shepard Hall after him.

== Works ==
- Dishonor in American Public Life (1882)
- The Work of a Social Teacher (1884)
- Martin Van Buren (1888), in the “American Statesmen Series”
- The Democratic Party (1892)

== See also ==
- People v. the Brooklyn Cooperage Company
- John Jay McKelvey, Sr., Attorney, Founder of Harvard Law Review.

== Bibliography ==
- Gerald Faulkner Shepard; Donald Lines Jacobus (1971). The Shepard Families of New England: Ralph Shepard of Dedham. New Haven Colony Historical Society. p. 399.
- "E. M. SHEPARD DIES AFTER LONG ILLNESS" (PDF). The New York Times. July 29, 1911.
- Gilman, D. C.; Peck, H. T.; Colby, F. M., eds. (1905). "Shepard, Edward Morse" . New International Encyclopedia (1st ed.). New York: Dodd, Mead.
- "Shepard, Edward Morse" . Encyclopedia Americana. 1920.
