= Norman E. Mack =

American journalist and politician (1856–1932)

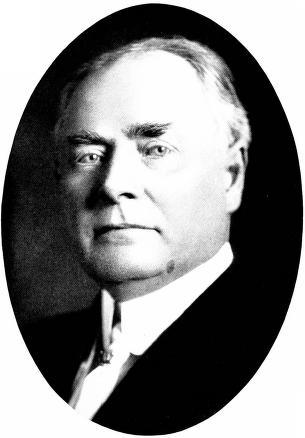

Chair of the New York Democratic Party
- In office 1911–1912
- Preceded by: Winfield A. Huppuch
- Succeeded by: George M. Palmer

Chair of the Democratic National Committee
- In office 1908–1912
- Preceded by: Thomas Taggart
- Succeeded by: William F. McCombs

Personal details
- Born: Norman Edward McEachran; July 24, 1856 West Williams, Canada West (now North Middlesex)
- Died: December 26, 1932 (aged 76) Buffalo, New York, U.S.
- Political party: Democratic
- Spouse: Harriet B. Taggart (m. 1891)
- Children: 2

Norman Edward Mack (born Norman Edward McEachran; July 24, 1856 – December 26, 1932) was editor and publisher of the Buffalo Times. He was also Chairman of the Democratic National Committee from 1908 to 1912.

== Early life ==
Norman Edward McEachran was born on July 24, 1856, in West Williams, Canada West. His parents were of Scotch-Canadian ancestry. He later shortened his name from McEachran to Mack.

When Mack turned 10, his family moved to Pontiac, Michigan. He attended a country school there that was built by his father. In 1868, Mack was a clerk at a mercantile house in Pontiac, Michigan. At the age of 15, he moved to London, Ontario, to work as a news agent. He quit his job as a news agent and sold self-published hotel registers.

== Career ==
In 1872, he worked in Detroit and Chicago in the advertising business. In 1874, he moved to Buffalo, New York. He worked in advertising and became publisher of Chautauqua Lake's Gazette in Jamestown. Starting in 1879, he worked as the editor and publisher of the Buffalo Sunday Times and later, in 1883, the Buffalo Daily Times.

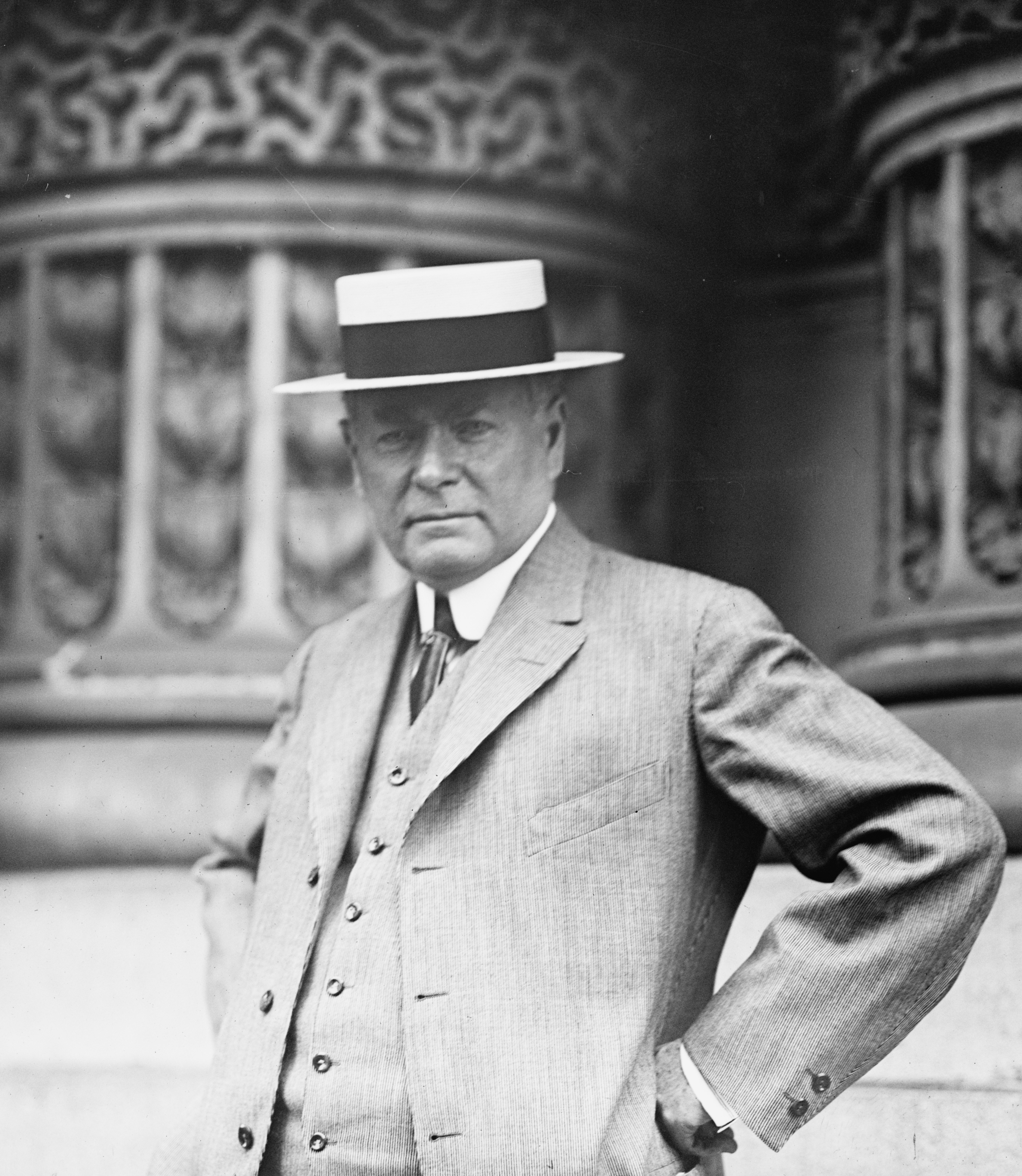
Norman E. Mack attending the 1912 Democratic National Convention in Baltimore

Mack was a Democrat. He was a delegate to the 1892, 1896, 1900 and 1904 Democratic National Conventions. He also served for two terms in the New York State Committee and starting in 1900, he became a member of National Democratic Committee, representing New York. He was chairman of the National Democratic Committee in 1908. Following his retirement, he was given the title of "Democratic National Committeeman Emeritus". He was chairman of the New York State Commission for the Panama–Pacific International Exposition in San Francisco in 1915. He served as park commissioner of Buffalo and was a member of the executive committee of the State Associated Press.

He sold his paper in 1929 to Scripps-Howard for US$6,000,000. He retired in 1931.

== Personal life ==
Mack married Harriet B. Taggart of Buffalo on December 22, 1891. They had two daughters, Harriet and Norma. He lived at 1100 Delaware Avenue in Buffalo.

Mack died following heart trouble on December 26, 1932, at his home at 1105 Delaware Avenue in Buffalo.

Party political offices
Preceded by Thomas Taggart	Chair of the Democratic National Committee; 1908–1912	Succeeded by William F. McCombs
Preceded by Winfield A. Huppuch	Chair of the New York Democratic Party; 1911–1912	Succeeded by George M. Palmer
