= 1916 United States Senate election in New York =

- November 7, 1916
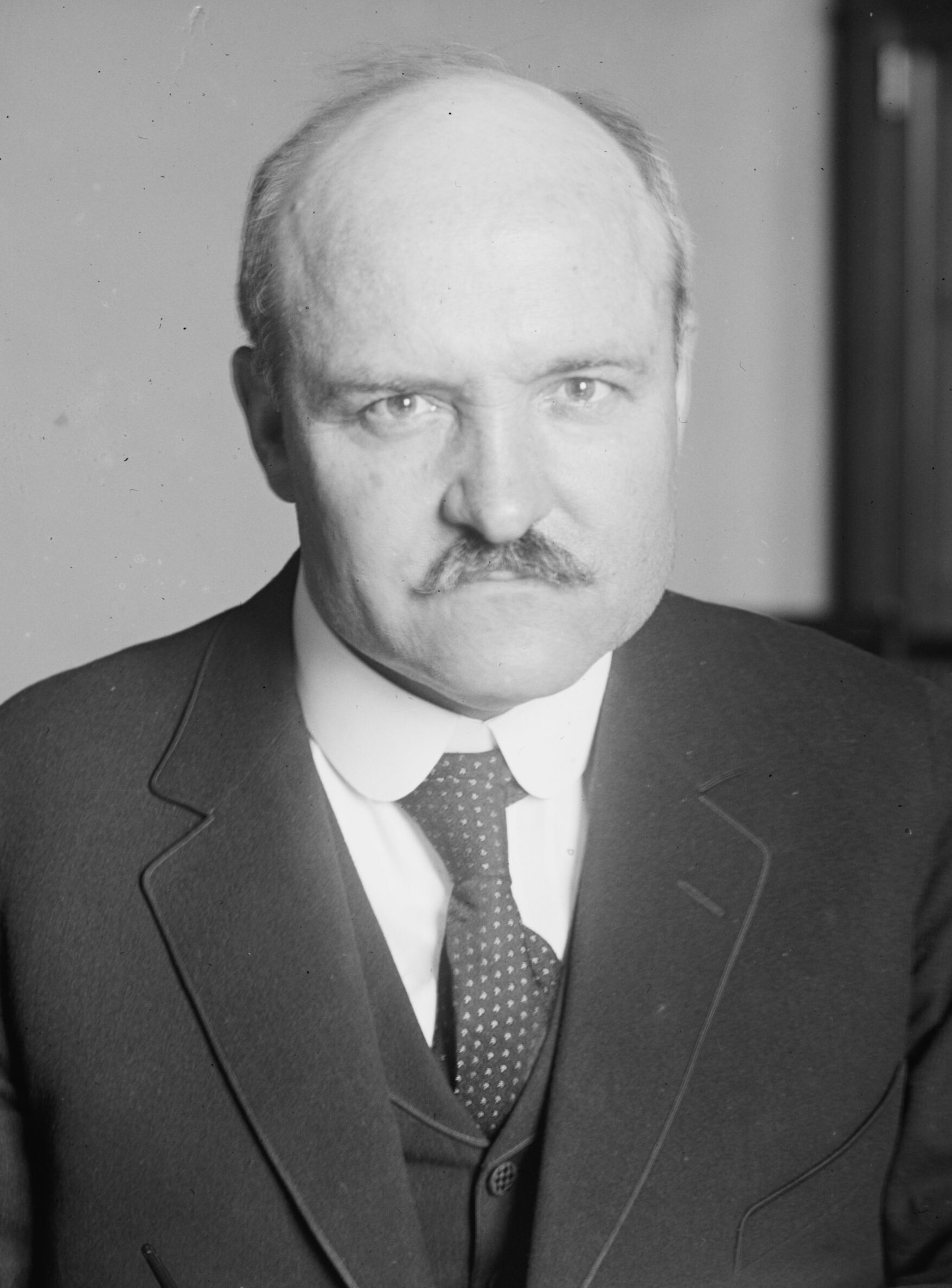

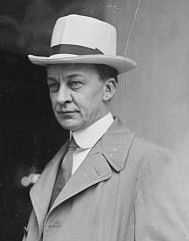
Nominee	William M. Calder	William F. McCombs
Party	Republican	Democratic
Alliance		American
Popular vote	839,314	605,933
Percentage	54.32%	39.22%
- County results Calder: 40–50% 50–60% 60–70% McCombs: 40–50% 50–60%
Senator before election
James O'Gorman
Democratic
Elected Senator
William M. Calder
Republican

The 1916 United States Senate election in New York was held on November 7, 1916. Incumbent Democratic Senator James O'Gorman chose not to seek re-election. Republican William M. Calder was elected to succeed O'Gorman, defeating Democrat William F. McCombs.

== Democratic primary ==
=== Candidates ===
- Thomas F. Conway, former Lieutenant Governor of New York
- William F. McCombs, Chairman of the Democratic National Committee

=== Results ===
1916 Democratic Senate Primary
Party	Candidate	Votes	%
Democratic	William F. McCombs	99,307	65.31%
Democratic	Thomas F. Conway	52,756	34.69%
Total votes		152,063	100.00%

== Republican primary ==
=== Candidates ===
- Robert Bacon, former United States Secretary of State and Ambassador to France (also running as American)
- William M. Calder, former U.S. Representative from Brooklyn and candidate for Senate in 1914 (also running as Progressive)

=== Results ===
1916 Republican Senate Primary
Party	Candidate	Votes	%
Republican	William M. Calder	153,373	51.51%
Republican	Robert Bacon	144,366	48.49%
Total votes		297,739	100.00%

== Progressive primary ==
=== Candidates ===
- William M. Calder, former U.S. Representative from Brooklyn (also running as Republican)
- Bainbridge Colby, former State Assemblyman and nominee for Senate in 1914

=== Results ===
1916 Progressive Senate Primary
Party	Candidate	Votes	%
Progressive	Bainbridge Colby	7,006	50.47%
Progressive	William M. Calder	6,875	49.53%
Total votes		13,881	100.00%

== General election ==
=== Candidates ===
- William M. Calder, former U.S. Representative and candidate for Senate in 1914 (Republican)
- Bainbridge Colby, former member of the New York Assembly and candidate for Senate in 1914 (Progressive)
- D. Leigh Colvin, attorney (Prohibition)
- Joseph D. Cannon, organizer for Metal Workers' Union (Socialist)
- August Gillhaus, nominee for U.S. president in 1908 (Socialist Labor)
- William F. McCombs, Chairman of the Democratic National Committee (Democratic and American)

The American Party initially nominated Robert Bacon, but following his defeat in the Republican primary, he withdrew. In his place, the Americans substituted Democratic nominee William F. McCombs.

=== Results ===
1916 United States Senate election in New York
Party	Candidate	Votes	%
Republican	William M. Calder	839,314	54.32%
Democratic	William F. McCombs	605,933	39.22%
Socialist	Joseph D. Cannon	61,167	3.96%
Prohibition	D. Leigh Colvin	19,302	1.25%
Progressive	Bainbridge Colby	15,339	0.99%
Socialist Labor	August Gillhaus	4,086	0.26%
Total votes		1,545,141	100.00%
