= Martin W. Littleton =

American politician (1872–1934)

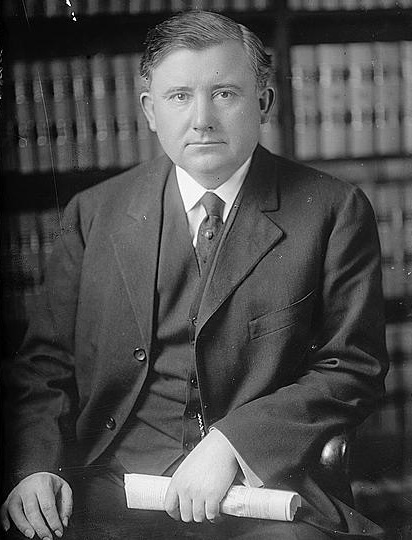
- Littleton circa 1920

Member of the U.S. House of Representatives from New York's 1st district
- In office March 4, 1911 – March 3, 1913
- Preceded by: William W. Cocks
- Succeeded by: Lathrop Brown

Borough President of Brooklyn
- In office January 1, 1904 – December 31, 1905
- Preceded by: J. Edward Swanstrom
- Succeeded by: Bird Sim Coler

Personal details
- Born: Martin Wiley Littleton; January 12, 1872 Kingston, Tennessee
- Died: December 19, 1934 (aged 62) Mineola, New York
- Resting place: Woodlawn Cemetery (Bronx, New York)
- Party: Democratic
- Spouse: Maud Wilson (m. 1896)
- Children: Martin W. Littleton Jr. (b. 1898 – d. 1966); Douglas M. Littleton (b. 1900 – d. 1919)

Martin Wiley Littleton (January 12, 1872 – December 19, 1934) was an American attorney known for his involvement in a number of high-profile trials during the early 1900s, including serving as chief defense counsel for Harry Kendall Thaw at his second trial in 1908 for the murder of renowned architect Stanford White, and defending Harry Ford Sinclair, the head of Sinclair Oil, from criminal charges resulting from the Teapot Dome scandal. Littleton also served one term as United States Representative from New York from 1911 to 1913, and was borough president of Brooklyn.

Littleton initially supported himself through menial labor and was largely self-educated, never attending college or law school. He eventually became one of the richest lawyers in the world, and has been mentioned as an example of a "rags to riches" success story in motivational books and articles.

He was the father of attorney Martin W. Littleton, Jr., the district attorney of Nassau County, New York who was involved in the investigation into the death of Starr Faithfull and the murder prosecutions of Everett Applegate and Mary Frances Creighton.

== Biography ==
=== Early life and career ===
Born on January 12, 1872, near Kingston, Tennessee, to Thomas Jefferson Littleton and Hannah G. Ingram, Martin Littleton came from a long line of mountaineers. His father had served as a federal officer during the Civil War, and had returned to Tennessee to farm and raise hogs. His mother died when he was a small child.

Martin Littleton was one of nineteen children and was born in a one-room log cabin. As a child, he did not attend school but instead worked on the family farm. His father and older sister taught him to read using the Bible and a few other books they owned. On trips to nearby Kingston with his father, he visited the local courthouse and watched cases being argued, sparking his interest in the practice of law.

When Littleton was 8 years old, his father remarried. Shortly after the marriage, in 1881, Littleton moved to Texas with his parents, eventually settling in Parker County, Texas. Littleton continued to attend legal hearings there at the local courthouse in Weatherford. In hopes of saving money to attend school, he held a variety of jobs starting at age 11, including working as a printer's devil, cattle herder, railroad track walker, baker, and road worker. Several of these jobs required him to be self-sufficient and be away from his family home on his own for long periods of time, despite his young age.

While working on the roads of Parker County, he attracted the attention of the county prosecutor, who offered him a job as both clerk and janitor at the county courthouse. Littleton took the job, studied law on his own while clerking, passed the bar examination, and was admitted to the bar in 1891 at age 20. After his bar admission, he became assistant prosecuting attorney in Parker County, and within a year had left that job and was privately defending murder cases before his twenty-first birthday. He later was an assistant prosecuting attorney in Dallas County from 1893 to 1896, where he also married.

=== New York political career ===
In 1896, Littleton moved with his wife to New York City to further pursue his legal career. He had $400 and a letter of introduction to banker George Foster Peabody, who helped him get a job at a law firm. Dissatisfied with his progress at the firm, Littleton asked a Brooklyn judge to appoint him as defense counsel for some indigent prisoners. His success in defending the prisoners brought him to the attention of the local Kings County district attorney's office, who eventually hired him. From 1900 to 1904, he served as assistant district attorney of Kings County. During this time, he successfully tried the case of People v. William F. Miller. Miller was one of the principals of the Franklin Syndicate, a Ponzi scheme, and was charged with the larceny of over 11 million dollars from investors. Miller was convicted and sentenced to 10 years in prison.

While establishing his practice in Brooklyn, Littleton also became known for his skill at public speaking, which led to his participation in local Democratic Party campaigns in 1897 and 1898. His voice was compared to the timbre of a cello, and he practiced his speeches until he could deliver them by memory in the same manner each time. He was the presiding officer of the New York State Democratic Convention in 1900, and its permanent chairman in 1902.

Littleton was a delegate to the 1904 Democratic National Convention, and was chosen to make the convention speech presenting the name of Alton B. Parker, who went on to win the Democratic nomination (although he lost the presidential election to Republican candidate Theodore Roosevelt). Littleton's speech was a great success, and according to The Baltimore Sun, it "put him in the front rank of American orators".

He served as borough president of Brooklyn in 1904 and 1905, but declined to seek reelection because of public criticism and difficulty supporting himself and his family on the borough president's salary. He returned to private practice, and gained national attention for his successful defense of Harry K. Thaw at his second murder trial in 1908 (see Notable cases).

In 1910, Littleton was elected as a Democrat to the Sixty-second Congress, holding office from March 4, 1911, to March 3, 1913. He won the election by 6,000 votes despite his district — which contained the Oyster Bay home of Republican former President Theodore Roosevelt — being considered a Republican stronghold. While in office, he once "astounded Congress" by giving a three-hour-and-forty-minute speech on "his unrivalled collection of trained adjectives and awe-inspiring nouns". The speech began:

Well, well, good people, here we are again with our unparalleled aggregation of sibilant synonyms, antonomastic antonyms, contumelious caconyms and tuneful tropes. Nowhere else on earth can be found such a collection of apposite adjectives, adjutory adverbs, novitious nouns and vorticular verbs. After years of patient exploration in the jeopardous jungles of Webster, the arenaceous acres of Funk and Wagnalls, and the refreshing rosetum of Roget, I shall exhibit before you this afternoon the fruits of my toil.

— Martin W. Littleton, quoted in The New York Times, December 20, 1934

In 1911, during his term as a Congressman, Littleton announced his candidacy for U.S. Senator from New York, a position that at that time was elected by the New York State Legislature. However, Littleton had denounced the Tammany Hall political machine, with the result that Tammany Boss Charles F. Murphy would not support Littleton's Senate bid and instead supported William F. Sheehan. A three-month-long deadlock followed, which was finally ended by New York State Senator Franklin D. Roosevelt forcing the legislature to accept a compromise candidate, James A. O'Gorman. Littleton was not a candidate for reelection in 1912 to the Sixty-third Congress, and resumed his private practice of law in the New York City area.

=== Notable cases ===
In 1908, Littleton was retained by multi-millionaire Harry K. Thaw as chief defense counsel in Thaw's second trial for the high-profile murder of prominent architect Stanford White on the rooftop of Madison Square Garden, after Thaw had learned of White's past relationship with Thaw's wife Evelyn Nesbit. Thaw's first trial had ended in a hung jury. Littleton was paid the then-large sum of $25,000 to represent Thaw. Littleton developed an insanity defense for the mentally unstable Thaw, and succeeded in obtaining a jury verdict of not guilty by reason of insanity.

During 1915 and 1916, Littleton represented producer-director D.W. Griffith in hearings in New York City and before the U.S. House of Representatives Committee on Education, concerning proposed bans or censorship of Griffith's film The Birth of a Nation, the content of which was being protested by the NAACP and other groups. Littleton contended, among other things, that a film shown in a private theater only to paying ticketholders should not be censored, because members of any group who might be offended could avoid seeing the film by simply choosing not to attend. He also argued that films in general should not be subject to federal censorship because they "mercilessly" analyzed public questions and social and religious controversies.

In 1928, Littleton successfully defended industrialist Harry Ford Sinclair on charges resulting from the Teapot Dome scandal. Sinclair was accused of bribing United States Secretary of the Interior Albert B. Fall to grant Sinclair's company, Sinclair Oil, an oil field lease to government land in Wyoming without competitive bidding. He was charged with criminal conspiracy to defraud the United States. Littleton managed to get Sinclair exonerated from the serious criminal conspiracy charges related to bribing Secretary Fall, although Fall was later convicted of accepting the bribe. Sinclair only served 9 months in prison on contempt of Congress and jury tampering charges relating to Sinclair's hiring of detectives to follow jurors. Time magazine hailed Littleton as "the man who last week extricated Harry Ford Sinclair from the oil scandal" and likened his legal maneuvers to Houdini. Time also recognized him as "one of the world's richest lawyers".

== Personal life ==
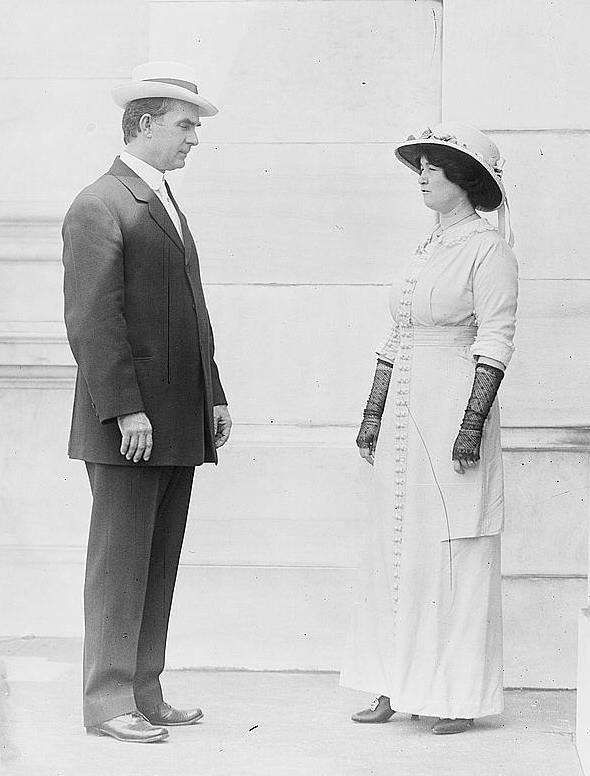
Texas Congressman Robert Lee Henry and Maud Littleton, who worked together to get the U.S. Government to buy Monticello.

Littleton married Maud Wilson, the daughter of an old Dallas family, in Dallas in 1896. After moving to New York City, the couple had two sons, Martin W. Littleton, Jr. and Douglas Marshall Littleton. Martin Littleton Jr., like his father, became an attorney and worked as a prosecutor and defense counsel. According to his contemporary obituary, Douglas Littleton died in 1919 at age 19 of pneumonia while serving as Undersecretary of the American Embassy in Paris just after World War I. While the obituary states that Douglas Littleton was "rejected from military service", other sources list him as a lieutenant in the United States Army and say that he died in France in the war.

During Littleton's term in Congress, his wife Maud was sought as a Washington hostess. She also spearheaded campaign tinged with antisemitism during the 1910s to get Congress to purchase Monticello, the former home of Thomas Jefferson which was deteriorating under its then-owner, and make it a public monument. Due to this campaign, she became known in the Hearst newspapers as "The Lady of Monticello". Despite obtaining the support of President Woodrow Wilson, other prominent people including Henry Watterson, William Jennings Bryan, and Henry Cabot Lodge, and the public, Maud Littleton's campaign was ultimately unsuccessful. Monticello was eventually purchased in 1923 by the Thomas Jefferson Foundation (then known as the Thomas Jefferson Memorial Foundation), a private non-profit organization.

As a result of Littleton's success, his younger sister, Rachel Littleton, was able to enter into New York society and became the first wife of newspaper publisher Cornelius Vanderbilt IV in 1920. They divorced in 1927.

The Littletons lived in various locations in and around New York City, including Brooklyn, Plandome Manor, Port Washington (which included much of what is now Plandome Manor prior to that village's incorporation), and Mineola. In Plandome Manor, the family lived on a 12-acre estate including a 1700s historic house called the Nicoll Mansion, and a library built by Littleton's wife as a memorial to their late son, with architecture similar to buildings in Palestine and surrounded by a high concrete wall with painted scenes of Jerusalem.

=== Death and burial ===
On December 19, 1934, Littleton died at Mineola of heart disease. He was interred in the Littleton family mausoleum at Woodlawn Cemetery in New York City.

Political offices
Preceded by J. Edward Swanstrom	Borough President of Brooklyn; 1904–1905	Succeeded by Bird S. Coler
U.S. House of Representatives
Preceded by William W. Cocks	Member of the U.S. House of Representatives from New York's 1st congressional district 1911–1913	Succeeded by Lathrop Brown
