= Governor Dix =

Governor Dix may refer to one of the following Governors of New York:

- John Adams Dix (1798–1879)
- John Alden Dix (1860–1928)
