= Irving G. Vann =

American judge

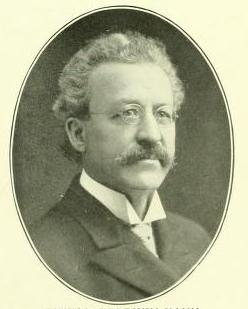
Irving G. Vann (1903)

Irving Goodwin Vann (January 3, 1842 – March 22, 1921) was an American lawyer, judge and politician from New York.

== Biography ==
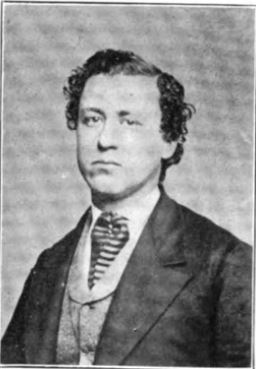
Irving Goodwin Vann

Irving Goodwin Vann was born in Ulysses, New York on January 3, 1842, the only child of Samuel R. Vann and Catherine H. (Goodwin) Vann. He received no formal education until he attended the Trumansburg Academy and then Ithaca Academy, in preparation for college. He enrolled at Yale College in 1859 and graduated B.A. in 1863. Vann initially pursued a career in education, becoming a high school principal and teacher in Owensboro, Kentucky; however, he resigned after a year to pursue a career in law instead. He began to study law at the office of Boardman & Finch in Ithaca, New York, and then entered Albany Law School in the fall of 1864, graduating in the spring of 1865. Upon graduation from Albany Law School, Vann worked briefly for the Department of Treasury in Washington, D.C., but within a year he returned home to central New York and joined the law firm of Raynor and Butler in Syracuse.

Vann married Julie Florence Dillaye (1846-1934), the daughter of a Syracuse real estate developer, on October 11, 1870. They had two children, Florence (1871-1942) and Irving Dillaye (1875-1944).

He was Mayor of Syracuse, New York from 1879 to 1880. He was a justice of the New York Supreme Court (5th District) from 1882 to 1895.

On December 31, 1895, he was appointed by Governor Levi P. Morton to the New York Court of Appeals to fill the vacancy caused by the resignation of Rufus W. Peckham, Jr, who had been appointed to the U.S. Supreme Court. In 1896, he was elected on the Republican ticket to a full term on the Court of Appeals, was re-elected in 1910, and remained on the bench until the end of 1912 when he reached the constitutional age limit of 70 years.

In 1913, he was one of the lawyers representing William Sulzer at his impeachment trial, and the only one who refused to receive monetary compensation from the State, noting that no further payment was necessary since he was already an employee of the state. (After his retirement as a judge, he had been appointed an official referee to hear claims arising out of the construction of the barge canal).

Vann died in Syracuse, New York on March 22, 1921, and was buried at the Oakwood Cemetery.

His son Irving Dillaye Vann (1876–1944) was a Deputy New York Attorney General.
