= Lorenzo B. Shepard =

American lawyer and politician (1821–1856)

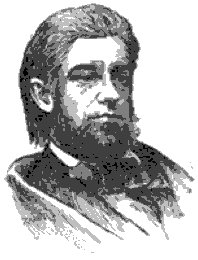

Personal details
- Born: Lorenzo Brigham Shepard; May 27, 1821 Cairo, New York
- Died: September 19, 1856 (aged 35) New York, New York
- Resting place: New York Marble Cemetery
- Spouse: Lucy Morse (m. 1842)
- Children: 5, including Edward M. Shepard
- Education: Read law
- Occupation: Jurist, politician

Lorenzo Brigham Shepard (May 27, 1821 – September 19, 1856) was an American lawyer and politician from New York.

== Life ==
Lorenzo B. Shepard was the son of David Brewster Shepard (1798–1835), a New York City lawyer.

At the age of 14, following the death of his parents, Shepard went to live in Oswego with his grandmother's brother David P. Brewster, a lawyer and congressman from 1839 to 1843. He studied law with Judge Ulysses D. French, was admitted to the bar in 1841, and practiced in partnership with French until 1848.

On July 5, 1842, Shepard married Lucy Morse, with whom he had five children, among them Edward Morse Shepard (1850–1911) who was the Democratic candidate for Mayor of New York City in 1901.

Lorenzo B. Shepard was a delegate to the New York State Constitutional Convention of 1846. In 1848, he was appointed by President James K. Polk as U.S. Attorney for the Southern District of New York to fill the vacancy caused by the death of Charles McVean, but was removed in 1849 by President Zachary Taylor.

Shepard was a delegate to the 1852 Democratic National Convention. On July 25, 1854, he was appointed by Gov. Horatio Seymour as New York County District Attorney to fill the vacancy caused by the death of N. Bowditch Blunt, and remained in office until the end of the year.

He was found dead at his home in the bath, with his head in the water and his feet on the floor, according to his obituary in the New York Times.

At the time of his sudden death, he was Corporation Counsel of New York City and Grand Sachem of Tammany Hall. He was buried at the New York Marble Cemetery.

== Sources ==
- The New York Civil List compiled by Franklin Benjamin Hough, Stephen C. Hutchins and Edgar Albert Werner (1867; page 531)
- Niles' National Register (issue of January 10, 1849)
- The Shepard Families of New England by Gerald Faulkner Shepard & Donald Lines Jacobus [gives Cairo, New York as birthplace]
- ELECTION.; LATEST STATE AND CITY RETURNS in NYT on November 10, 1855
- CITY ELECTION.; OFFICERS ELECTED in NYT on November 12, 1855
- Sudden Death of Lorenzo B. Shepard in NYT on September 20, 1856 [gives Westerlo, New York as birthplace]
- Death and Burial of Lorenzo B. Shepard in NYT on September 22, 1856

Legal offices
| Preceded by Charles McVean | United States Attorney for the Southern District of New York; 1848–1849 | Succeeded by Jonathan Prescott Hall |
| Preceded by N. Bowditch Blunt | New York County District Attorney; 1854 | Succeeded by A. Oakey Hall |
