= Harriet Mack =

American politician (1866–1954)

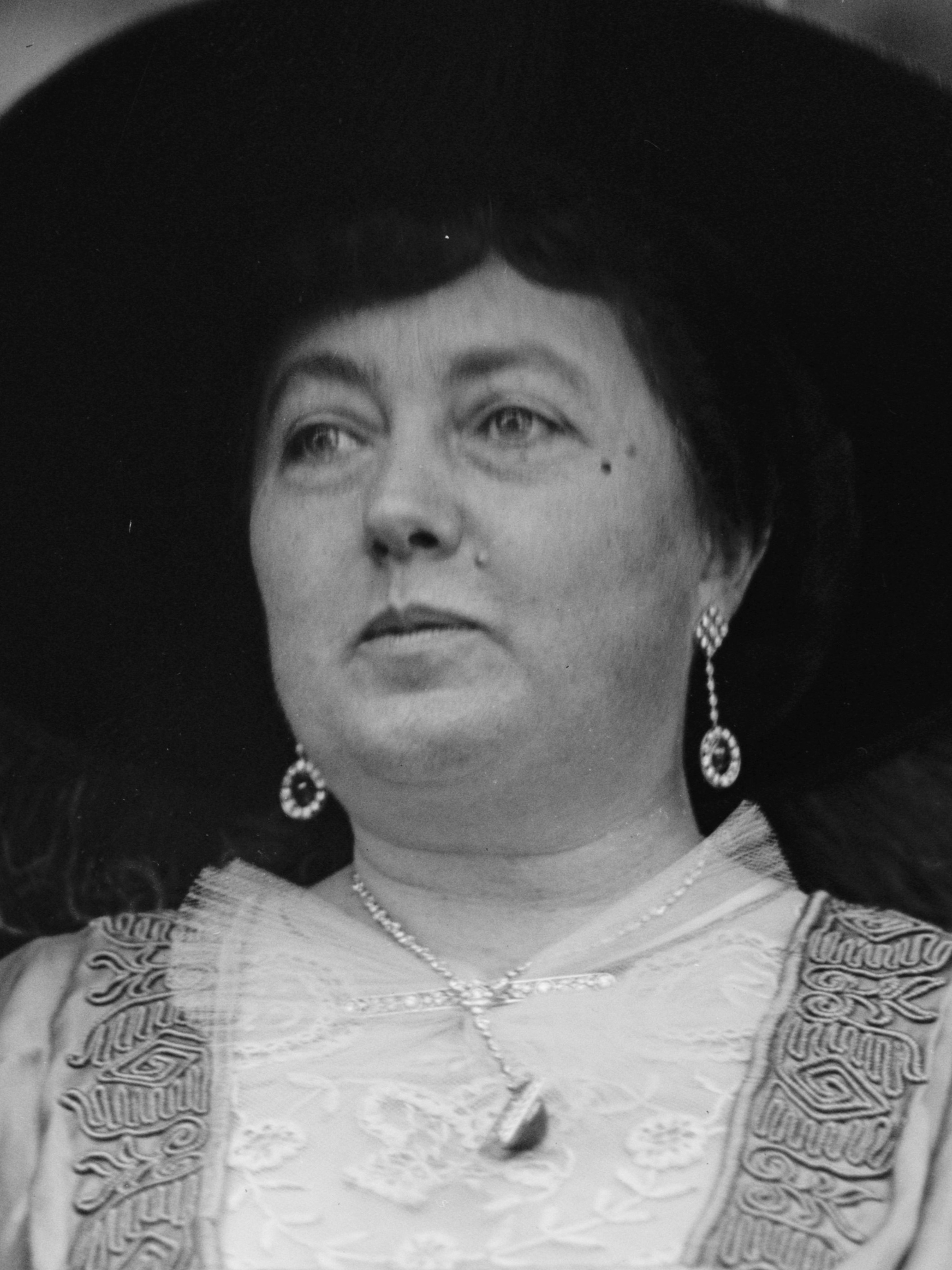
- Harriet Mack in 1912
- Born: 1866; Buffalo, New York
- Died: August 2, 1954 (aged 87–88); Buffalo, New York
- Spouse: Norman E. Mack (m. 1891)
- Relatives: George Wadsworth II (son-in-law)

Harriet Belle Mack (née Taggart; 1866 – August 2, 1954) was an American politician. She and her husband Norman E. Mack were influential figures in the New York State Democratic Party.

== Biography ==
Mack was a presidential elector and delegate to the Democratic National Convention from New York in 1932, 1936, 1940 and 1944. In 1933 she was a delegate to the New York convention to ratify 21st amendment in 1933. In 1933, she was a candidate for Democratic National Committeewoman for New York State to replace Elisabeth Marbury. She also served on the Board of Women Managers of the Pan-American Exposition.

Mack and her husband Norman E. Mack had two daughters, Harriet and Norma. In 1949, her granddaughter, also named Harriet Mack, married the Royal Navy veteran Charles Compton.
