= 1909 United States Senate election in New York =

- January 19, 1909

Majority vote of each house needed to win
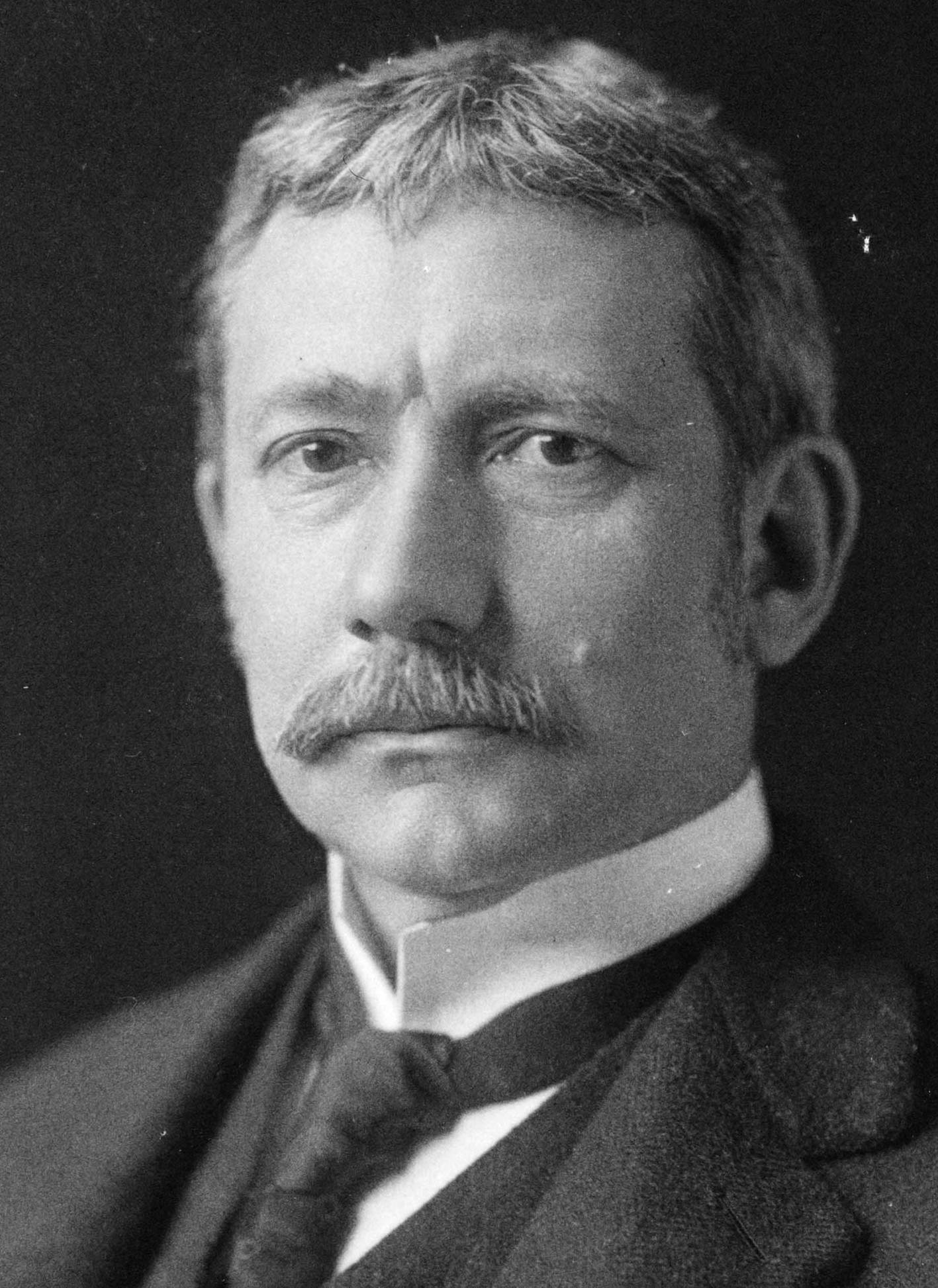

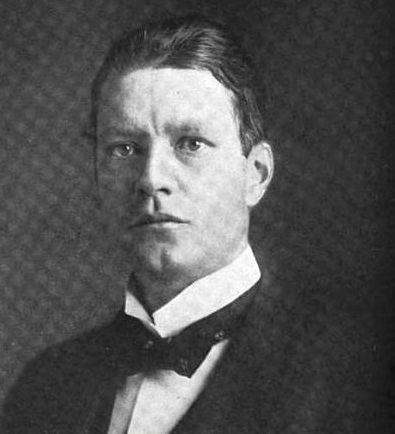
Nominee	Elihu Root	Lewis S. Chanler
Party	Republican	Democratic
Senate	35	15
Percentage	70.00%	30.00%
House	90	30
Percentage	75.00%	25.00%
Senator before election
Thomas C. Platt
Republican
Elected Senator
Elihu Root
Republican

The 1909 United States Senate election in New York was held on January 19, 1909, by the New York State Legislature to elect a U.S. senator (Class 3) to represent the State of New York in the United States Senate.

== Background ==
Republican Thomas C. Platt had been re-elected to this seat in 1903, and his term would expire on March 3, 1909.

At the State election in November 1908, 35 Republicans and 16 Democrats were elected for a two-year term (1909–1910) in the state senate; and 99 Republicans and 51 Democrats were elected for the session of 1909 to the Assembly. The 132nd New York State Legislature met from January 5 to April 30, 1909, at Albany, New York.

== Candidates ==
=== Republican caucus ===
The Republican caucus met on January 18. State Senator J. Mayhew Wainwright presided. The caucus nominated U.S. Secretary of State Elihu Root unanimously. Root was the choice of President Theodore Roosevelt. President pro tempore of the State Senate John Raines lauded warmly Root's nomination, eulogized the retiring U.S. Senator Platt, and declared war on Governor Charles Evans Hughes's reforms.

=== Democratic caucus ===
The Democratic caucus met also on January 18. They nominated ex-lieutenant governor Lewis S. Chanler unanimously. Chanler had been elected lieutenant governor in 1906 on the Democratic/Independence League ticket, and had served under Republican governor Hughes. Chanler had just been defeated when running against Hughes for governor in November 1908.

== Result ==
Elihu Root was the choice of both the Assembly and the state senate, and was declared elected.

1909 United States Senator election result
Office	House	Republican		Democrat	
U.S. Senator (Class 3)	State Senate (50 members)	Elihu Root	35	Lewis S. Chanler	15
	State Assembly (150 members)	Elihu Root	90	Lewis S. Chanler	30

Note: The votes were cast on January 19, but both Houses met in a joint session on January 20 to compare nominations, and declare the result.

== Aftermath ==
Root resigned as U.S. Secretary of State on January 27, 1909, and was succeeded by his Assistant Secretary Robert Bacon for the remaining five weeks of Roosevelt's presidency. Root then served a single term and remained in the U.S. Senate until March 3, 1915, when he retired. After the 74-day deadlock to elect a successor to U.S. Senator Chauncey M. Depew in 1911, the U.S. Constitution was amended, and at the State election in November 1914, for the first time a U.S. Senator was elected by statewide popular vote. James Wolcott Wadsworth, Jr. won the nomination in the Republican primary election, and was then elected to succeed Root.

== See also ==
- United States Senate elections, 1908 and 1909

== Sources ==
- Members of the 61st United States Congress
- ROOT IS CHOSEN FOR U.S. SENATOR; ...Democrats Choose Chanler in NYT on January 19, 1909
- ROOT IS CHOSEN SENATOR in NYT on January 20, 1909
