= Frederick Collin =

American judge

Frederick Collin (August 2, 1850 – November 26, 1939) was an American lawyer and politician from New York.

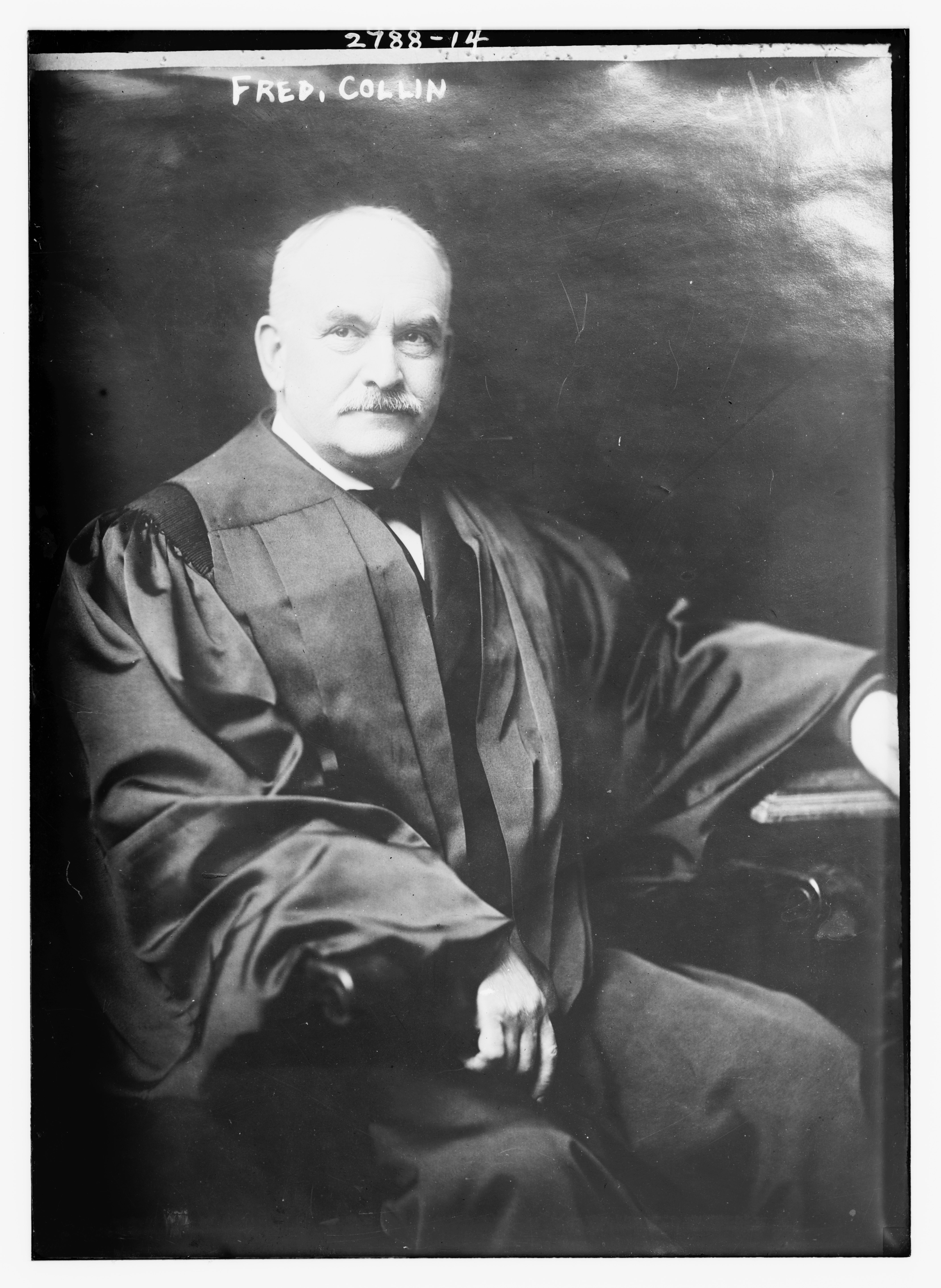
Frederick Collin c. 1913

== Life ==
Frederick Collin born in Benton, New York, the third son of Henry Clark Collin and Maria Louise (Park) Collin. He graduated from Yale University in 1871, where he was a member of Skull and Bones, and subsequently started a legal clerkship in 1875 under John A. Reynolds in Elmira, New York. In 1885, John B. Stanchfield joined the firm, which became known as Reynolds, Stanchfield & Collin (named Sayles & Evans since 1945). He was President of Elmira's Board of Education (1887–1894, 1899–1910), Elmira City Attorney (1890–1892), and Mayor of Elmira (1894–1898).

In October 1910, Governor Charles Evans Hughes appointed Collin to the New York Court of Appeals to fill the vacancy caused by the death of Edward T. Bartlett. In November 1910, he was elected to a full term, and remained on the bench until the end of 1920 when he reached the constitutional age limit of 70 years. Afterwards he resumed the practice of law at Elmira and re-joined the law firm of which he had been a founding partner. The firm changed its name to Stanchfield, Collin, Lovell & Sayles.

Collin also served as a director of the Chemung Canal Trust Company and the first President of the Arnot Art Gallery (since 1911).
