= Thomas F. Conway =

American politician

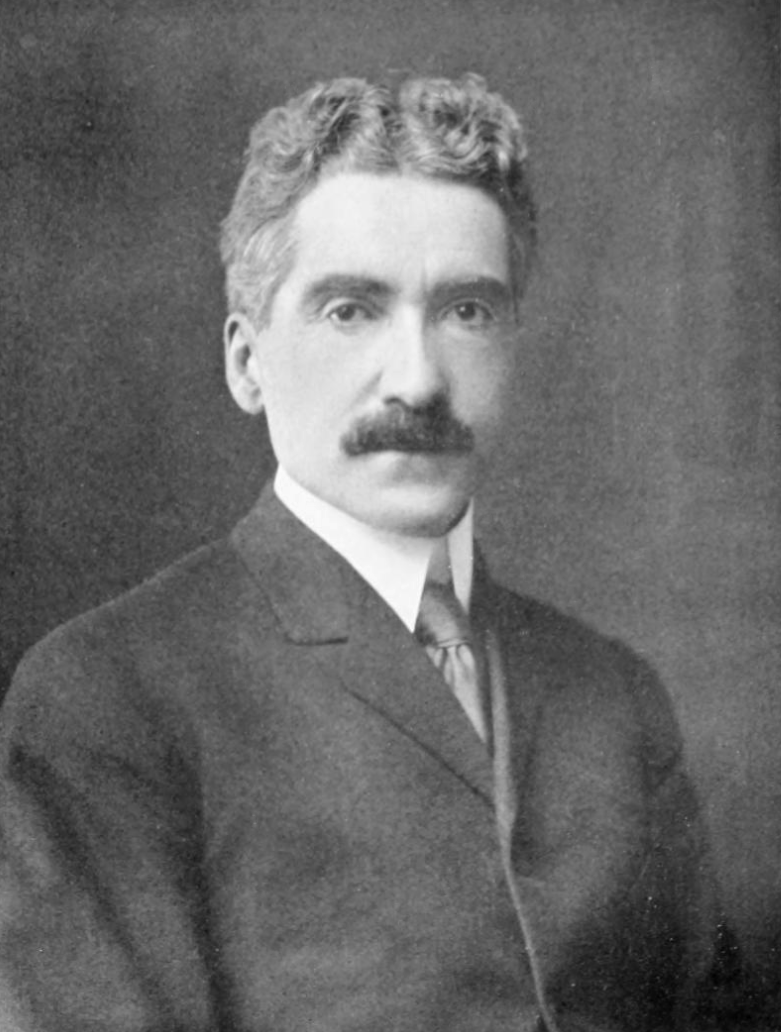
Conway c. 1916

Thomas Franklin Conway (May 4, 1862 – November 9, 1945) was an American lawyer and politician from New York. He was the lieutenant governor of New York from 1911 to 1912.

== Life ==
Born in Chesterfield, New York, he was the son of John Conway and Mary (Collins) Conway. He was admitted to the bar in 1885. In 1890, he removed to Plattsburgh.

He was a delegate to the 1896, 1904, 1912, 1916, 1920, 1924, 1928, 1932, 1936, 1940 and 1944 Democratic National Conventions.

In 1898 and 1900, he ran for New York State Attorney General but was defeated twice by Republican John C. Davies. He was Lieutenant Governor of New York from 1911 to 1912, elected on the Democratic ticket with Governor John Alden Dix in 1910. In 1916, he lost the Democratic primary for U.S. Senator from New York to William F. McCombs.

He died on November 9, 1945, aged 83, at his home in Plattsburgh, New York.

== Sources ==
- Encyclopedia of Biography of New York: A Life Record of Men and Women of the Past Whose Sterling Character and Energy and Industry Have Made Them Preëminent in Their Own and Many Other States by Charles Elliott Fitch (American Historical Society, 1916; Vol 4)

Party political offices
Preceded by John Alden Dix	Democratic nominee for Lieutenant Governor of New York; 1910	Succeeded by Martin H. Glynn
Political offices
Preceded by George H. Cobb; Acting	Lieutenant Governor of New York; 1911–1912	Succeeded by Martin H. Glynn
