= James A. O'Gorman =

American politician (1860–1943)

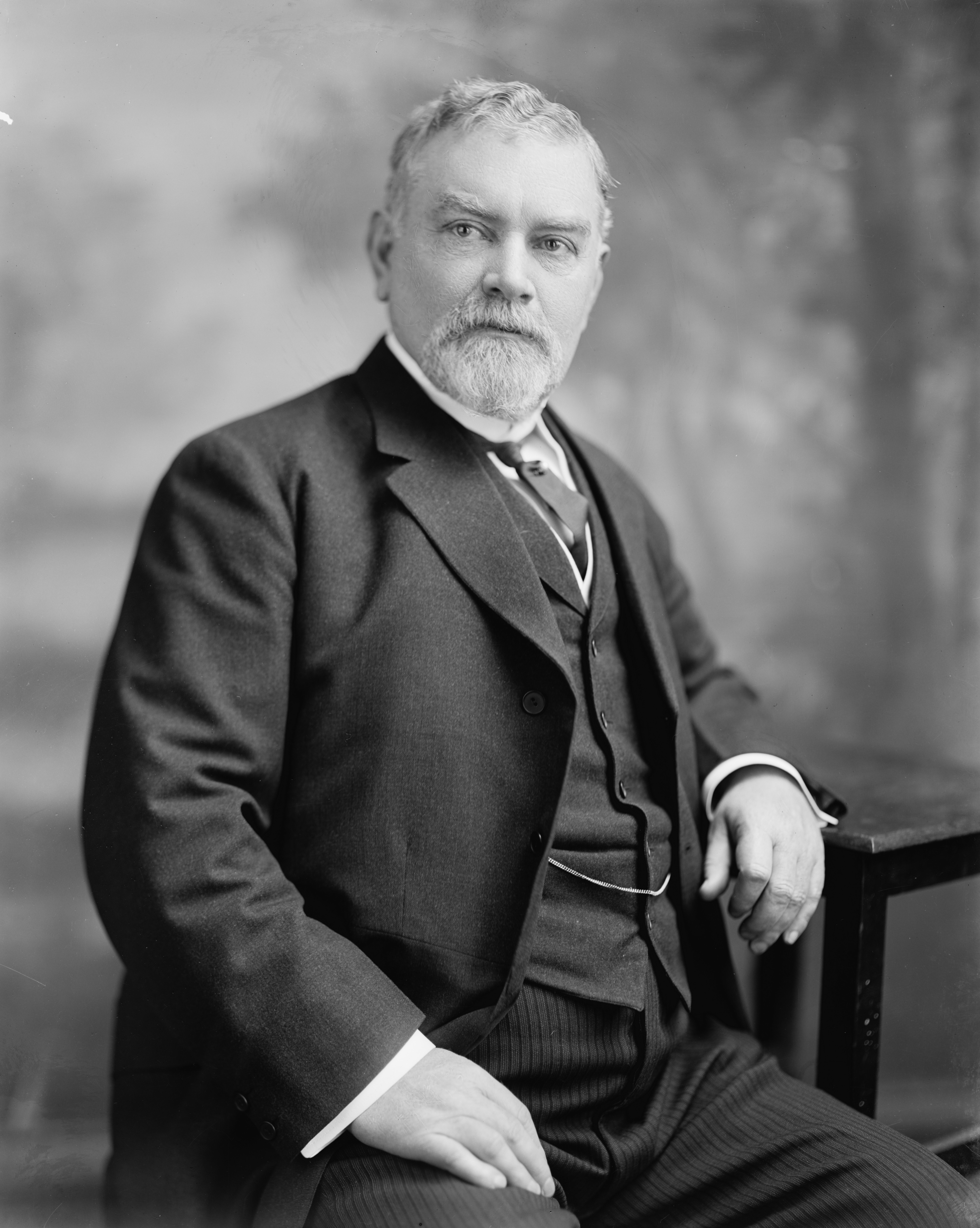
- Portrait by Harris & Ewing, c. 1911–1916

United States Senator from New York
- In office March 31, 1911 – March 3, 1917
- Preceded by: Chauncey Depew
- Succeeded by: William M. Calder

Grand Sachem of the Tammany Society
- In office 1902–1906
- Preceded by: Thomas L. Feitner
- Succeeded by: William Bourke Cockran

Justice of the New York Supreme Court's 1st District
- In office 1900–1911
- Preceded by: Morgan J. O'Brien
- Succeeded by: Daniel F. Cohalan

Judge of New York City's 11th District Civil Court
- In office 1893–1900
- Preceded by: Thomas E. Murray
- Succeeded by: Thomas E. Murray

Personal details
- Born: James Aloysius O'Gorman; May 5, 1860 Manhattan, New York, U.S.
- Died: May 17, 1943 (aged 83) Manhattan, New York, U.S.
- Resting place: Calvary Cemetery, Queens, New York
- Party: Democratic
- Other political affiliations: United Labor (1886–1887)
- Spouse: Anne Leslie O'Gorman
- Children: 10
- Relatives: Dudley Field Malone (son-in-law)
- Education: New York University School of Law
- Profession: Attorney

James Aloysius O'Gorman (May 5, 1860 – May 17, 1943) was an American attorney, judge, and politician from New York. A Democrat, he is most notable for his service as a United States senator from March 31, 1911, to March 3, 1917.

A native of Manhattan, New York City, O'Gorman was educated in the schools of the city and received his LL.B. degree from New York University School of Law in 1882. He was admitted to the bar and began to practice in New York City. He also became involved in politics as a Democrat, including leadership roles in the Tammany Hall organization. He served a Tammany's Grand Sachem from 1902 to 1906.

In 1892, O'Gorman was elected judge of New York City's 11th District Civil Court. He served from 1893 to 1900, when he resigned in order to assume his seat as a justice of the New York Supreme Court's 1st District, to which he had been elected in 1899. He continued to serve on the Supreme Court until resigning in order to assume his seat in the U.S. Senate.

In 1911, O'Gorman was proposed as a compromise choice for U.S. senator after Democrats in the New York State Legislature were unable to agree on a nominee. He was elected and served one term, 1911 to 1917. After leaving the senate, O'Gorman resumed the practice of law in New York City.

O'Gorman died at his home in Manhattan on May 17, 1943. He was buried at Calvary Cemetery in Queens.

== Early life ==
James Aloysius O'Gorman was born in Manhattan, New York City on May 5, 1860, the son of Thomas and Ellen O'Gorman. He was educated in the schools of Manhattan and attended the College of the City of New York. He then began attendance at New York University School of Law. While in law school, O'Gorman also studied stenography and worked as a stenographer in the law office of Merritt E. Sawyer, a former judge. O'Gorman graduated in May 1882 with a LL.B. degree. He was admitted to the bar later that month and established a practice in New York City.

In addition to practicing law, O'Gorman was involved in politics at an early age. At 21, he was elected chairman of his election district's Democratic committee, which was aligned with the Tammany Hall organization. Soon afterwards, he became a member of the Democratic Club of New York. As his career progressed, O'Gorman continued to rise through Tammany Hall's leadership ranks. In 1886, he was active in the unsuccessful mayoral campaign of United Labor Party nominee Henry George, and in 1887 he ran unsuccessfully for district court judge as a United Labor candidate, but he later returned to the regular Democratic fold.

== Early political career ==
O'Gorman c. 1899

O'Gorman practiced law from an office at the corner of Fulton Street and Broadway, and he developed a reputation for effective representation in civil trials. He also continued his political activities, attending numerous local and state conventions as a delegate. He was a delegate to the 1896 Democratic National Convention, and afterwards supported the unsuccessful ticket of William Jennings Bryan and Arthur Sewall in the general election.

In 1892, O'Gorman was elected judge of New York City's 11th District Civil Court, and he served from 1893 to 1900. In 1899, he was the successful Democratic nominee for one of two seats as a justice of the New York Supreme Court's 1st District. He was elected, and served from 1900 until resigning in 1911.

In 1902, O'Gorman was elected Grand Sachem, the leader of the Tammany Society, succeeding Thomas L. Feitner. He served until 1906, and was succeeded by William Bourke Cockran.

== U.S. Senator ==
In 1911, O'Gorman was elected to the United States Senate. At the time, senators were chosen by state legislatures, and Democrats controlled both houses of the New York State Legislature, meaning a Democrat would probably be selected to succeed Republican incumbent Chauncey M. Depew. At the start of the contest in January 1911, Republicans re-nominated Depew nearly unanimously.

Democrats nominated William F. Sheehan, who had served as lieutenant governor from 1892 to 1894 and had the support of Tammany Hall. In response, a faction of 19 legislators opposed to Tammany was organized by State Senator Franklin D. Roosevelt. This faction ("The Insurgents") pledged not to support Sheehan, and was large enough to prevent him from obtaining a majority in the legislative election. Balloting took place throughout January, February, and March, with Sheehan's support shifting between 63 and 86 votes, well short of the 101 needed to win. The deadlock was finally broken when Charles Francis Murphy, the "boss" of Tammany Hall, proposed O'Gorman as a compromise. The Insurgents acquiesced, and O'Gorman was elected on the 64th ballot, receiving 112 votes to 80 for Depew.

O'Gorman served one term, March 31, 1911, to March 3, 1917, and was not a candidate for reelection in 1916. He was succeeded by Republican William M. Calder, who defeated Democrat William F. McCombs in the November 1916 general election.

During his Senate term, O'Gorman was chairman of the Committee on Interoceanic Canals. In addition, he served at different times on the committees on Foreign Relations, Immigration, Judiciary, Manufactures, Naval Affairs, and Rules.

== Later life ==
After leaving the Senate, O'Gorman resumed the practice of law as a partner in the form of O'Gorman, Battle and Vandiver. He was frequently called on by the New York Supreme Court to serve as a referee in civil cases, which included the mid-1920s dispute among the heirs of Jay Gould.

O'Gorman was a director of the New York Title and Mortgage Company and the American Trust Company. In addition, he served as a trustee of New York University and the College of New Rochelle.

O'Gorman died at his home in Manhattan, New York City on May 17, 1943. He was buried at Calvary Cemetery, Queens, New York.

== Awards ==
O'Gorman received several honorary degrees during his career. These included: Villanova University (LL.D., 1904); Fordham University (LL.D., 1908); New York University (LL.D., 1909); and Georgetown University (LL.D., 1911).

== Family ==
In 1884, O'Gorman married Anne M. Leslie (1862–1943). They were the parents of ten children, eight of whom lived to adulthood:

- Mary O'Gorman Malone (1884–1961), the wife of Dudley Field Malone.
- Ellen O'Gorman Duffy (1886–1975), a longtime trustee of Barnard College and president of the Women's University Club of New York.
- Edith Patricia O'Gorman McDonald (1887–1910), who married attorney James A. McDonald in September 1910, and died the following November.
- Dolorita O'Gorman Maher (1889–1981), the wife of businessman John A. Maher, whose father was Edward A. Maher.
- Alice O'Gorman (1891–1965)
- Ann Aloysia O'Gorman White (1892–1961), the wife of lumber company executive Paul M. White.
- Agnes Katherine O'Gorman Shanley (1895–1974), the wife of architect Joseph Sanford Shanley.
- James Aloysius O'Gorman (1898–1946), an attorney in New York City who died after being struck by a taxi.
- Richard O'Gorman (1899–1899)
- Robert Emmett O'Gorman (1900–1906)

U.S. Senate
Preceded by Chauncey M. Depew	U.S. Senator (Class 1) from New York; 1911–1917	Succeeded by William M. Calder
