= William Bruce Ellison =

American politician

William Bruce Ellison (July 17, 1857 – December 6, 1924) was a Canadian-American lawyer and politician.

== Life ==
Ellison was born on July 17, 1857, in St. Thomas, United Province of Canada, the son of Richard Ellison and Sarah Eleanor Arthurs. His parents were both American.

Ellison attended public school in Ontario. In 1880, he was admitted to the Ontario bar as a barrister and solicitor. He then moved to New York City, New York, and began clerking with Stewart L. Woodford. He was admitted to the New York bar in 1882. He became a prominent member of the city's Merchants' Association and Real Estate Board, becoming trustee of a number of large estates. He wrote several works on insurance law, including "Insurer and Insured," "Insurance Companies Before the Courts," and "Fire Insurance." A supporter of strengthening relations between the United States and Canada, he also wrote "The Unification of the United States and Canada" and "Canadian-American Fisheries."

In 1892, Ellison was elected to the New York State Assembly as a Democrat, representing the New York County 23rd District. He served in the Assembly in 1893. While in the Assembly, he submitted bills that authorized New York City to build a rapid transit railroad, improved the sanitation condition in schools, provided for an exhibition of New York schools in the World's Fair, provided for the regulation of labels and trademarks, established free churches, and provided for the appointment of women as members of boards of education.

In 1906, Ellison became Commissioner of Water Supply, Gas and Electricity. In 1907, he became Corporation Counsel. The New York Supreme Court often appointed him Commissioner for the condemnation of lands for public purposes.

Ellison was a member of the American Bar Association, the New York State Bar Association, the New York City Bar Association, the New York County Lawyers' Association, the American Academy of Political and Social Science, the American Economic Association, the Academy of Political Science, the Manhattan Club, and the Atlantic Yacht Club. He was an Episcopalian. In 1883, he married May Alma Jackson. Their children were Bruce and Alma.

Ellison died at home from heat disease on December 6, 1924.

New York State Assembly
Preceded by George P. Webster	New York State Assembly; New York County, 23rd District; 1893	Succeeded by Judson Lawson
