= John Alden Dix =

American politician (1860–1926)

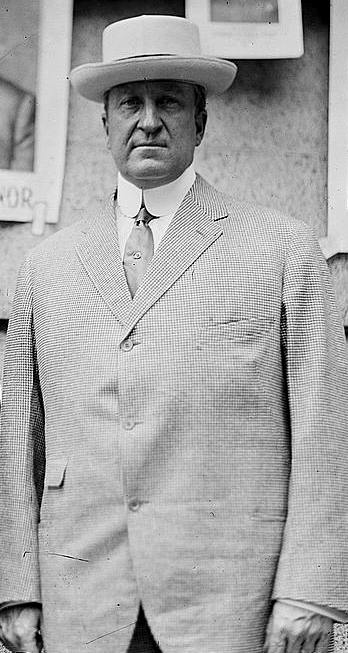

38th Governor of New York
- In office January 1, 1911 – December 31, 1912
- Lieutenant: Thomas F. Conway
- Preceded by: Horace White
- Succeeded by: William Sulzer

Personal details
- Born: December 25, 1860 Glens Falls, New York, U.S.
- Died: April 9, 1928 (aged 67) New York City, U.S.
- Party: Democratic
- Spouse: Gertrude Alden Thomson (m. 1889; died 1923)
- Education: Cornell University
- Profession: Businessman

John Alden Dix (December 25, 1860 – April 9, 1928) was an American businessman and politician who served as 38th governor of New York from January 1911 to January 1913.

A native of Glens Falls, New York, Dix attended Cornell University before becoming active in several Dix family business ventures. He later expanded into the lumber and paper industries, where his success made him wealthy.

Dix became active in politics as a Democratic Party, and served terms as chairman of the Washington County Democratic Committee and the New York State Democratic Committee. In 1908, Dix was an unsuccessful candidate for Lieutenant Governor of New York.

In 1910, Dix was the successful Democratic nominee for governor, and he served one two-year term, January 1911 to December 1912. His term was largely concerned with issues of workplace safety in the wake of the Triangle Shirtwaist Factory fire. In 1912, Dix ran for reelection, but lost the Democratic nomination to William Sulzer.

After leaving the governorship, Dix returned to management of his business interests. In retirement he became a resident of Santa Barbara, California. He died in New York City in 1928, and was buried in Albany, New York.

== Life ==
John Alden Dix was born on December 25, 1860, in Glens Falls, New York, to Laura (née Stevens) and James Lawton Dix. His maternal great-grandparents, Ozias (1750–1835) and Lucy Hatch Dix (1752–1831), were first cousins. His second cousin, twice removed is Daniel H. Wells. He graduated from Glens Falls Academy and attended Cornell University from 1879 to 1882. He was a member of the Theta Delta Chi fraternity.

== Career ==
After college, Dix was employed in the Dix family businesses, including a quarry and a machine shop, for five years. He then worked in a lumber business called Thomson & Dix in Thomson with Lemon Thomson. In 1897, the firm was dissolved after the death of Thomson. He then purchased Thomson's interest and developed a paper mill in Thomson and manufactured paper. He was president of the Iroquois Paper Company, treasurer of the American Woodboard Company, president of the Albany Securities Company, vice president of the Blandy Paper Company and manager of the Moose River Lumber Company. He was the first vice president of the First National Bank of Albany and director of the National Bank of Schuylerville, Albany Trust Company and the Glen Falls Trust Company.

=== Political career ===
Dix also became involved in politics, including serving as a delegate to the 1904 Democratic National Convention, and chairman of the Washington County and New York State Democratic Committees. In 1906, he was an unsuccessful candidate for the Democratic nomination for governor at the party's state convention.

In 1908, Dix was the Democratic nominee for Lieutenant Governor of New York on the ticket with Lewis S. Chanler, but was defeated.

Dix ran for governor again in 1910; he won the Democratic nomination, and won the November general election. During his term, Dix established a New York State Factory Commission to investigate factory conditions, a reaction to the Triangle Shirtwaist Factory fire; as a result of the commission's work, 32 worker safety laws were enacted by the legislature and approved by Dix. After a fire destroyed a large portion of the state capitol building, Dix successfully advocated state legislation that improved fire safety regulations and building codes.

Other Dix accomplishments in office included creation of the state Conservation Commission, the law authorizing direct primary elections, and a law limiting work weeks to 54 hours. In 1912 he was a delegate to the Democratic National Convention. He also ran for reelection in 1912, but lost the Democratic nomination to William Sulzer.

== Personal life ==
On April 24, 1889, Dix married Gertrude Alden Thomson of Albany, the daughter of Lemon Thomson, his business partner. Gertrude's sister, Nancy Sherman Thomson (1867–1927), was married to State Senator Curtis N. Douglas (1856–1919). He was warden of St. Stephen's Episcopal Church in Schuylerville.

After leaving office Dix retired to Santa Barbara, California. He was also active in civic endeavors including service on the Cornell University board of trustees. In 1912, he received the honorary degree of LL.D. from Hamilton College.

Mrs. Dix died in Santa Barbara in 1923; the couple had no children.

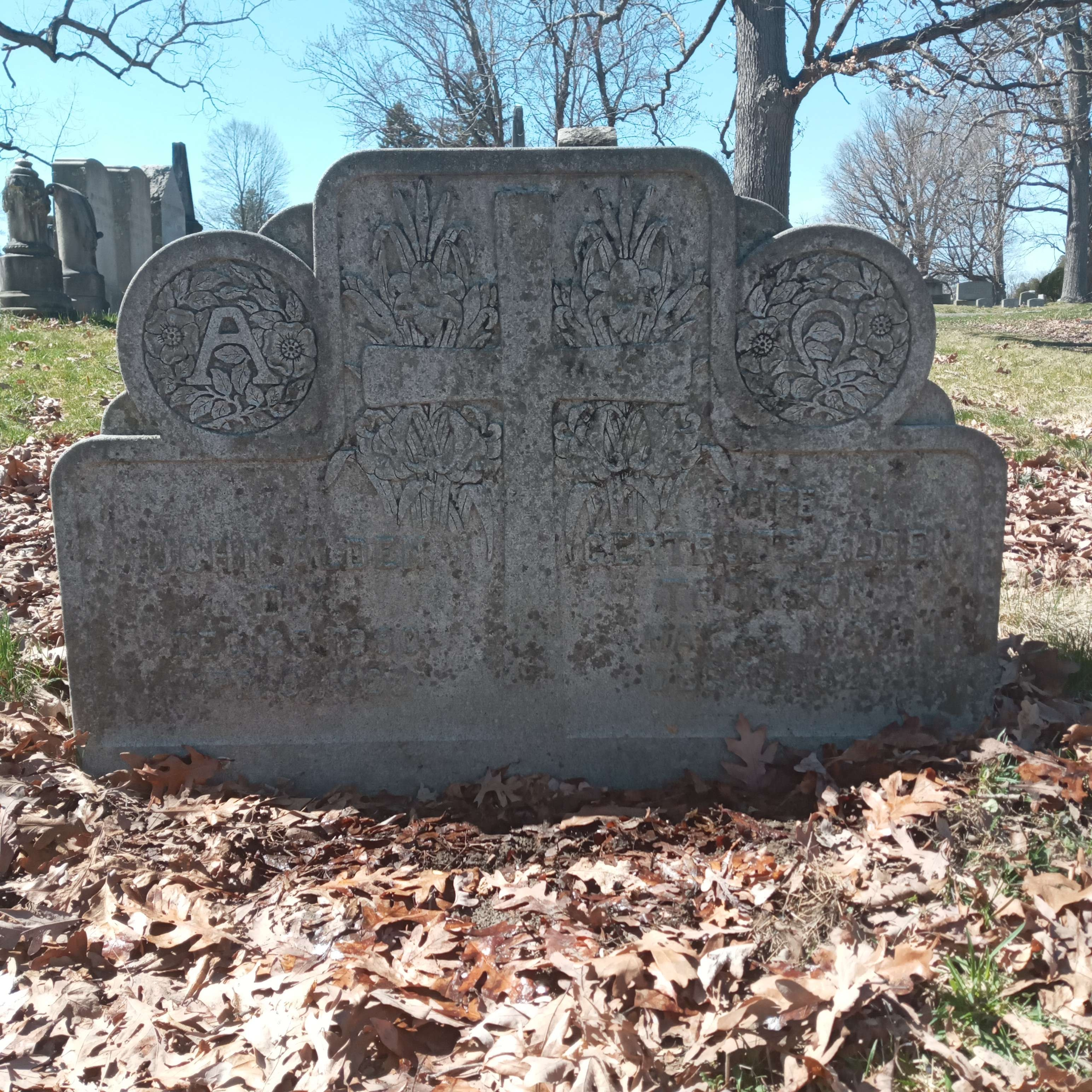
The gravesite of Governor John Alden Dix

Dix died in New York City on April 9, 1928, and was buried at Albany Rural Cemetery in Menands.

== The other Governor Dix ==
John Alden Dix had the same first and last name as Union General and Governor of New York John Adams Dix, and was often referred to in the press as a nephew or a first cousin once removed of John Adams Dix. In fact, John Alden Dix had no known family relationship with John Adams Dix.

== Trivia ==
Governor Dix planned to sail to Europe with his wife on April 20, 1912, aboard the RMS Titanic. For obvious reasons this journey was canceled.

Party political offices
Preceded by Lewis S. Chanler; 1906	Democratic Party nominee for Lieutenant Governor of New York; 1908	Succeeded by Thomas F. Conway; 1910
Preceded by William J. Conners	Chairman of the New York State Democratic Committee; 1910	Succeeded by Winfield A. Huppuch
Preceded by Lewis Stuyvesant Chanler	Democratic nominee for Governor of New York; 1910	Succeeded by William Sulzer
Political offices
Preceded by Horace White	Governor of New York; 1911–1912	Succeeded by William Sulzer
