= 1910 New York state election =

1910 New York gubernatorial election
- November 8, 1910
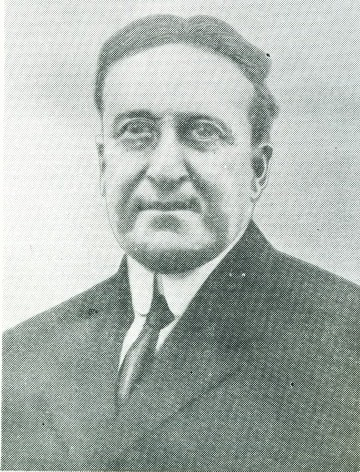

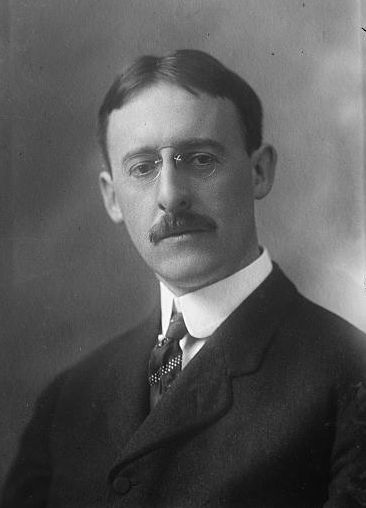
Nominee	John Alden Dix	Henry L. Stimson
Party	Democratic	Republican
Popular vote	689,700	622,299
Percentage	48.00%	43.31%
- County results Dix: 40–50% 50–60% 60–70% Stimson: 40–50% 50–60% 60–70%
Governor before election
Horace White
Republican
Elected Governor
John Alden Dix
Democratic

The 1910 New York state election was held on November 8, 1910, to elect the governor, the lieutenant governor, the Secretary of State, the state comptroller, the attorney general, the state treasurer, the state engineer and two judges of the New York Court of Appeals, as well as all members of the New York State Assembly and the New York State Senate. The voters were also asked if they approved a $2,500,000 bond issue for the improvement and extension of Palisades Interstate Park, which was answered in the affirmative, with 349,281 For and 285,910 Against. A constitutional amendment which proposed to add two judges to the New York Court of Appeals and to increase the judges' salaries was rejected by a margin of only 292 votes, with 332,300 For and 332,592 Against.

== History ==
The Socialist state convention met on June 26 at Schenectady, New York. They nominated Charles Edward Russell for governor; Gustave Adolph Strebel for lieutenant governor; Mrs. Bertha Mathews Fraser, of Brooklyn, for secretary of state; Orcus A. Curtis for comptroller; Sylvester Butler, of Schenectady, for treasurer; Henry L. Slobodin for attorney general; William Lippelt, of Rochester, for state engineer; and Morris Hillquit and Louis B. Boudin for the Court of Appeals. Bertha M. Fraser was the first woman in New York history to be nominated for state office.

The Republican state convention met on September 27 and 28 at Saratoga Springs, New York. Ex-President Theodore Roosevelt was elected temporary chairman. Roosevelt steamrollered the old political bosses, and made the convention nominate his choices. Henry L. Stimson was nominated on the first ballot after a nominating speech by Roosevelt (vote: Stimson 684, William S. Bennet 242, Thomas B. Dunn 38, James B. McEwan 35).

The Democratic state convention met on September 29 and 30 at Rochester, New York. Herbert P. Bissell, of Buffalo, was permanent chairman. John Alden Dix was nominated for governor on the first ballot (vote: Dix 434, William Sulzer 16).

The Independence League state convention met on October 5 at Cooper Union in New York City. Alfred J. Boulton, the People's Party candidate for governor in 1904, was temporary chairman until the choice of Herbert R. Limberg, of New York City, as permanent chairman. Hearst (at the time on board the Mauretania returning from Europe, and in contact by wireless messages) wanted the League to endorse the Republican ticket, but the delegates chose to nominate a separate ticket (vote: 212 for, 94 against, 93 did not vote). They nominated the chairman of the League's State Committee John J. Hopper for governor, and Hearst for lieutenant governor, and then adjourned. The convention met again on October 7, and nominated Dr. Thomas P. Scully, of Oneida County, for secretary of state; Arnold B. MacStay, of New York City, for comptroller; William I. Sirovich for treasurer; James E. Lee, of Rockland County, for state engineer; Robert Stewart, of Brooklyn, for attorney general; and Reuben Robie Lyon and James A. Allen, of New York City, for the Court of Appeals.

== Result ==
The whole Democratic ticket was elected.

The incumbent Vann was re-elected. The incumbents Koenig, O'Malley and Williams were defeated.

The Republican, Democratic, Independence League, Socialist and Prohibition parties maintained automatic ballot status (necessary 10,000 votes), the Socialist Labor Party did not re-attain it.

1910 state election results
Office	Democratic ticket		Republican ticket		Socialist ticket		Independence League ticket		Prohibition ticket		Socialist Labor ticket	
Governor	John Alden Dix	689,700	Henry L. Stimson	622,299	Charles Edward Russell	48,529	John J. Hopper	48,470	T. Alexander MacNicholl	22,295	Frank E. Passanno	5,717
Lieutenant Governor	Thomas F. Conway	662,630	Edward Schoeneck	632,746	Gustave A. Strebel	48,573	William Randolph Hearst	60,286	Calvin McCarthy	23,503	James T. Hunter	5,852
Secretary of State	Edward Lazansky	650,879	Samuel S. Koenig	649,006	Bertha M. Fraser	48,492	Thomas P. Scully	54,132	N. Horace Gillette	24,095	Henry Kuhn	5,922
Comptroller	William Sohmer	661,811	James Thompson	643,403	Orcus A. Curtis	48,668	Arnold B. MacStay	48,909	Bernard Clauson	23,809	Carl A. Luedecke	5,936
Attorney General	Thomas Carmody	654,768	Edward R. O'Malley	650,312	Henry L. Slobodin	48,601	Robert Stewart	48,280	Francis E. Baldwin	23,767	Lewis F. Alrutz	5,953
Treasurer	John J. Kennedy	662,093	Thomas F. Fennell	643,761	Sylvester Butler	48,619	William I. Sirovich	48,148	Charles J. Call	23,846	William A. Walters	5,940
State Engineer	John A. Bensel	661,450	Frank M. Williams	643,384	William Lippelt	48,508	James A. Lee	48,322	Albert W. Pierson	23,608	Jeremiah D. Crowley	5,950
Judge of the Court of Appeals	Irving G. Vann	1,301,969	Irving G. Vann		Morris Hillquit	48,982	Reuben Robie Lyon	48,698	Alfred L. Manierre	23,721	Charles H. Chase	5,841
Judge of the Court of Appeals	Frederick Collin	1,298,859	Frederick Collin		Louis B. Boudin	48,232	James A. Allen	47,825	Gilbert Elliott	23,207	(none)	

Obs.:

- "Blank, void and scattering" votes: 8,239 (Governor); 10,007 (Lt. Gov.); 10,695 (Secretary); 10,811 (Comptroller); 11,066 (Treasurer); 11,129 (Engineer); 11,295 (Att. Gen.); 429,307 (amendment); 448,869 (bond issue)
- In the Appeals Court election, Collin received 1,131,944 votes on the Democratic line and 166,915 as an Independent. Vann received 1,156,079 votes on the Republican line and 145,890 votes as an Independent.

== See also ==
- New York gubernatorial elections

== Sources ==
- The tickets in Auburn (Soc., Proh., Soc. L.) in The Auburn Citizen on October 29, 1910
- The Rep. nominees: STIMSON FIGHTER OF BIG GRAFT CASES in NYT on September 29, 1910
- The Dem. nominees: DIX HAS RISEN FAST IN STATE POLITICS in NYT on October 1, 1910
- Result: FINAL FIGURES OUT ON STATE ELECTION in NYT on December 16, 1910 [omits judges]
- Result in New York City: Revised City Vote on State Ticket in NYT on November 10, 1910
- New York State Red Book 1911
- Result: The Tribune Almanac 1911
