= Winfield A. Huppuch =

American politician (born 1861)

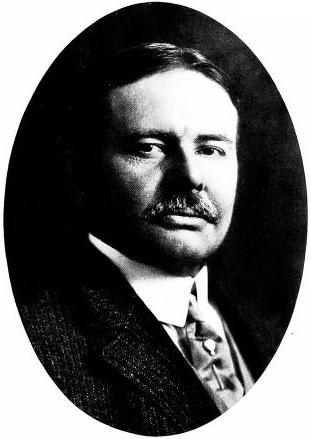
Winfield A. Huppuch (1916)

Winfield Adelbert Huppuch (born 1861 in Sandy Hill (now Hudson Falls), Washington County, New York) was an American politician from New York.

== Biography ==
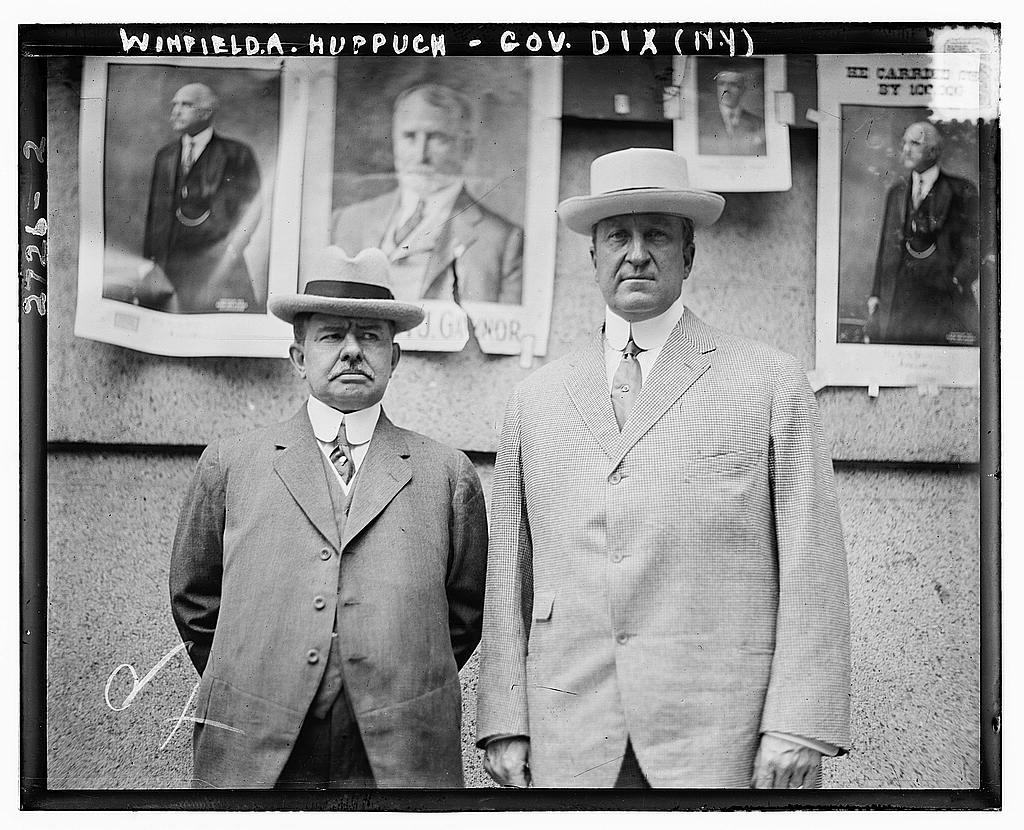
Huppuch with Gov. Dix (c.1912)

He was President of the Standard Wall Paper Company, of Hudson Falls.

He ran for Congress in New York's 23rd congressional district in 1896, but was defeated by Republican Wallace T. Foote, Jr. Huppuch was Chairman of the New York State Democratic Committee from 1910 to 1911.

Huppuch was a member of the New York State Commission for the Panama–Pacific International Exposition in 1915.

He was a delegate to the Democratic National Conventions in 1912, 1916 and again in 1920 as an alternate. He was also a delegate in 1928, 1932, and 1936. He was also a delegate to New York convention to ratify the Twenty-first Amendment to the United States Constitution in 1933.
