= William F. McCombs =

American lawyer

William McCombs
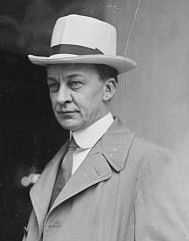
- McCombs in 1917

Chair of the Democratic National Committee
- In office July 15, 1912 – June 15, 1916
- Preceded by: Norman E. Mack
- Succeeded by: Vance C. McCormick

Personal details
- Born: William Frank McCombs; December 26, 1876 Hamburg, Arkansas, U.S.
- Died: February 22, 1921 (aged 44) Greenwich, Connecticut, U.S.
- Party: Democratic
- Education: Princeton University (BA); Harvard University (LLB)

William Frank McCombs (December 26, 1876 – February 22, 1921) was an American lawyer and politician who served as chair of the Democratic National Committee from 1912 to 1916.

== Early life and education ==
McCombs was born on December 26, 1876, in Hamburg, Arkansas. He earned a Bachelor of Arts degree from Princeton University in 1898 and a Bachelor of Laws from Harvard Law School in 1901.

== Career ==
McCombs was associated with the law firm of McCombs & Ryan in New York City. McCombs also worked as an advisor to Woodrow Wilson during the 1910 New Jersey gubernatorial election later managed Wilson's successful campaign during the 1912 Democratic Party presidential primaries. Once nominated, Wilson made him chairman of the Democratic National Committee and essentially his "campaign manager." In 1913, McCombs was offered the position of United States ambassador to France, but turned it down for financial reasons.

McCombs came to oppose Wilson's leadership style and use of power, criticizing him as autocratic. McCombs was also displeased at Wilson for refusing to offer him a Cabinet position.

McCombs was the Democratic nominee in the 1916 United States Senate election in New York but was defeated by Republican William M. Calder.

== Personal life ==
In poor health, McCombs died in Greenwich, Connecticut, on February 22, 1921, leaving behind an incomplete memoir, which was published as Making Woodrow Wilson President. He was buried at Roselawn Cemetery in Little Rock, Arkansas.

Party political offices
Preceded by Norman E. Mack	Chair of the Democratic National Committee; 1912–1916	Succeeded by Vance C. McCormick
First	Democratic nominee for U.S. Senator from New York (Class 1); 1916	Succeeded by Royal S. Copeland
