= 1926 United States Senate election in New York =

- November 2, 1926
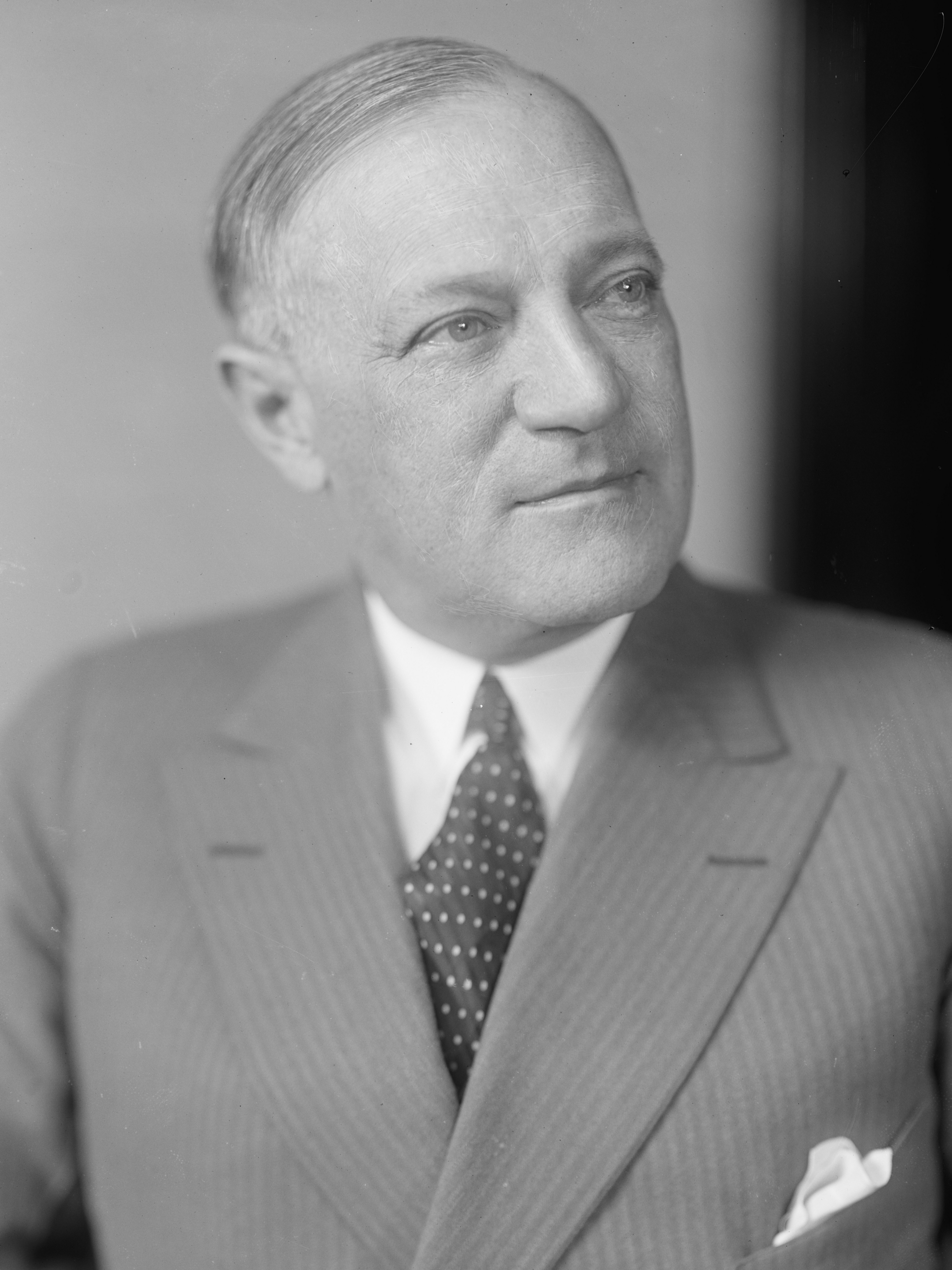

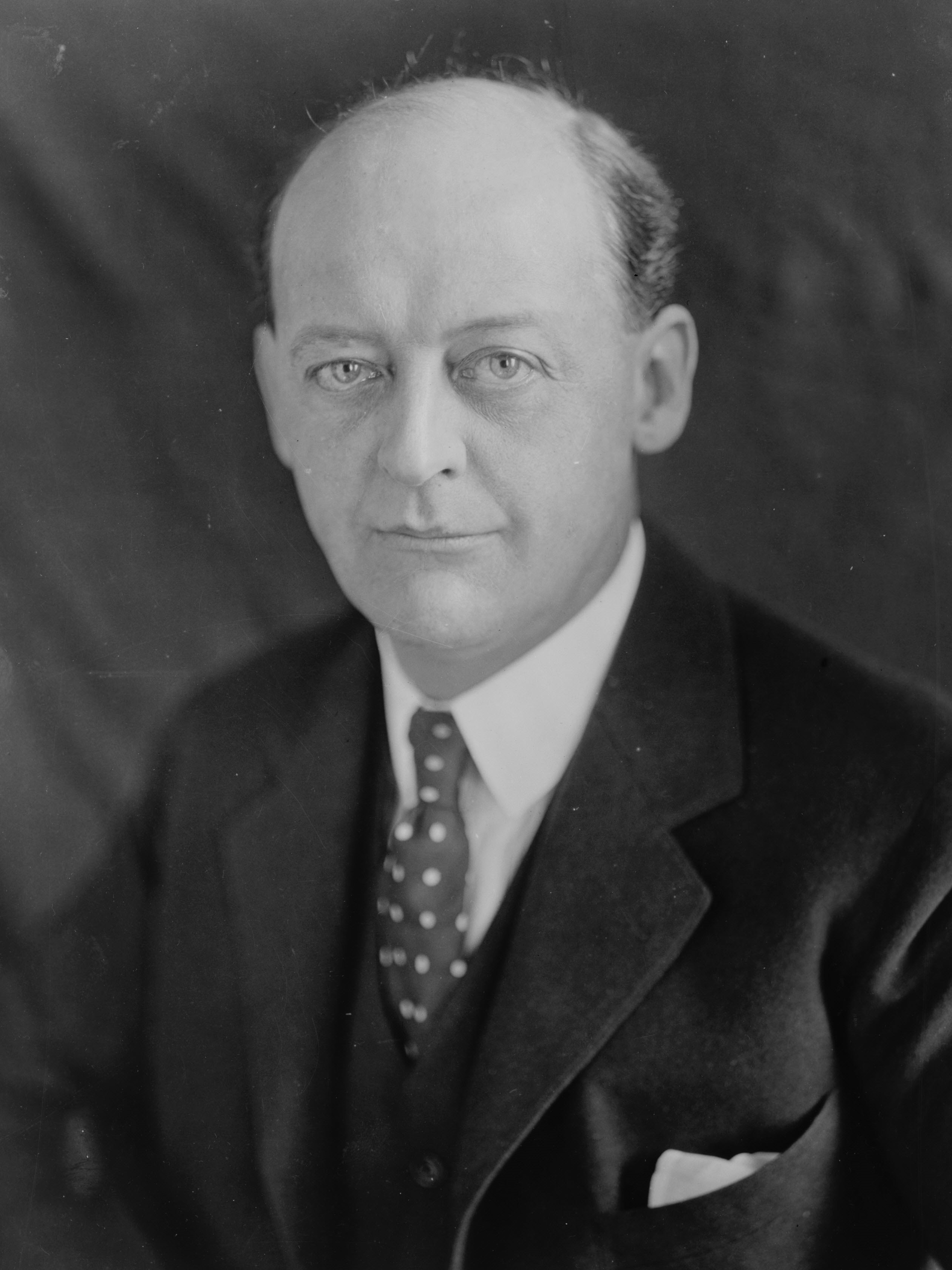

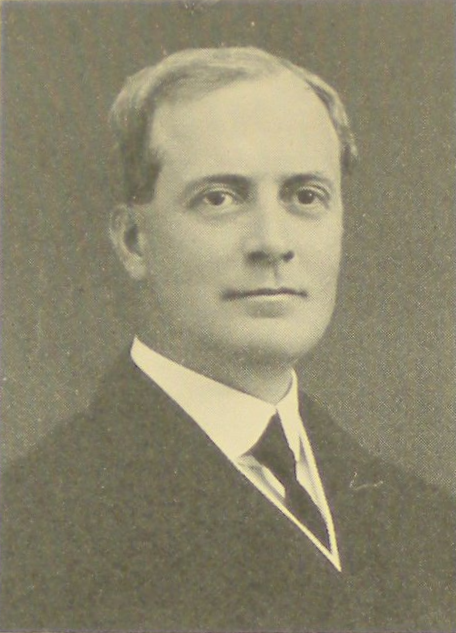
Nominee	Robert F. Wagner	James W. Wadsworth	Franklin W. Cristman
Party	Democratic	Republican	Independent Republican
Alliance			Prohibition
Popular vote	1,321,463	1,205,246	231,906
Percentage	46.48%	42.40%	8.16%
- County results Wagner: 50–60% 60–70% Wadsworth: 30–40% 40–50% 50–60% 60–70%
Senator before election
James W. Wadsworth
Republican
Elected Senator
Robert F. Wagner
Democratic

The United States Senate election of 1926 in New York was held on November 2, 1926. Incumbent Republican Senator James Wolcott Wadsworth Jr. ran for re-election to a third term, but was defeated by Democrat Robert F. Wagner.

== Republican convention ==
=== Candidates ===
- Franklin W. Cristman, State Senator from Herkimer
- James Wolcott Wadsworth Jr., incumbent Senator

=== Campaign ===
Incumbent Senator Wadsworth was opposed by hard-line prohibitionists, who instead supported Franklin W. Cristman at the Republican Convention.

=== Results ===
1926 Republican Convention
Party	Candidate	Votes	%
Republican	James Wolcott Wadsworth Jr. (incumbent)	1,235	93.77%
Republican	Franklin W. Cristman	58	4.40%
None	Abstaining	23	1.75%
Republican	Charles Evans Hughes	1	0.08%
Total votes		1,317	100.00%

== Democratic nomination ==
=== Candidates ===
- Robert F. Wagner, New York Supreme Court Justice and former State Senator

== General election ==
=== Candidates ===
- Joseph Brandon (Socialist Labor)
- Franklin W. Cristman, State Senator from Herkimer (Independent Republican)
- William F. Dunne, editor of the Butte Bulletin (Workers)
- James Wolcott Wadsworth Jr., incumbent Senator (Republican)
- Robert F. Wagner, New York Supreme Court Justice and former State Senator (Democratic)
- Jessie Wallace Hughan, radical pacifist and activist (Socialist)

After failing to qualify for a primary election against Senator Wadsworth, Cristman announced his campaign as an independent Republican. He supported Prohibition and was opposed to Wadsworth's position as a "wet" (or anti-Prohibition) Republican.

=== Results ===
1920 United States Senate election in New York
Party	Candidate	Votes	%
Democratic	Robert F. Wagner	1,321,463	46.48%
Republican	James Wadsworth (incumbent)	1,205,246	42.40%
Independent Republican	Franklin W. Cristman	231,906	8.16%
Socialist	Jessie Wallace Hughan	73,412	2.58%
Communist	William F. Dunne	6,444	0.23%
Socialist Labor	Joseph Brandon	3,064	0.15%
Total votes		2,842,813	100.00%
