= Franklin W. Cristman =

American politician (1869–1942)

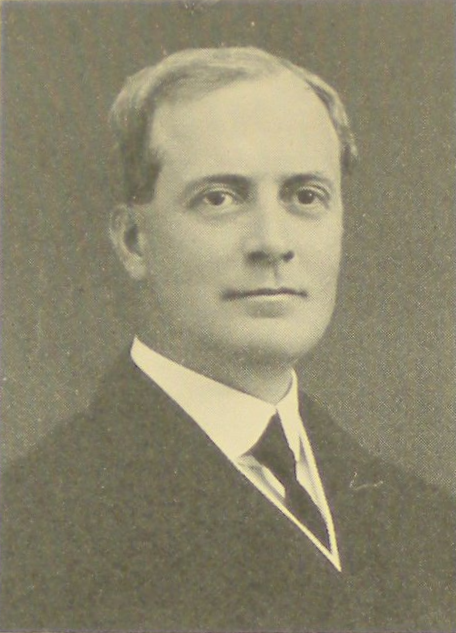

Member of the New York Senate from the 32nd district
- In office 1915–1916
- Preceded by: Seth G. Heacock
- Succeeded by: Theodore Douglas Robinson

Franklin Webster Cristman (January 11, 1869 in Columbia, Herkimer County, New York – August 3, 1942 in Herkimer, New York) was an American lawyer and politician from New York.

== Life ==
He was the son of James Cristman (1844–1917) and Catherine (Steele) Cristman (1847–1900). He attended Pulaski Academy, and graduated LL.B. from Albany Law School in 1892. He was admitted to the bar in 1894, and practiced in Herkimer. In 1898, he fought as a corporal in the Spanish–American War. On September 23, 1903, he married Camilla Quackenbush MD (1876–1925), and their son was Marx Quackenbush Cristman (1909–2005).

Cristman was a Republican member of the New York State Assembly (Herkimer Co.) in 1914. He was a member of the New York State Senate (32nd D.) in 1915 and 1916; and was Chairman of the Committee on Privileges and Elections.

At the New York state election, 1926, he ran as an "Independent Republican" for U.S. Senator from New York. Cristman was a "dry" Republican, and was supported, and fervently campaigned for, by the Prohibition Party, although he didn't appear on the ballot under the Prohibition line. He polled about 232,000 votes, and thus spoiled the re-election of the "wet" Republican incumbent James W. Wadsworth, Jr. who had openly and forcefully opposed Prohibition. Wadsworth was defeated by Democrat Robert F. Wagner with a plurality of about 116,000 votes.

Cristman died on August 3, 1942, in Herkimer, New York; and was buried at the Oak Hill Cemetery there.

== Sources ==
- STATE DRY GROUPS PICK F. W. CRISTMAN AS WADSWORTH FOE in NYT on June 8, 1926 (subscription required)
- CITY ELECTS WAGNER in NYT on November 3, 1926 (subscription required)
- Cristman genealogy transcribed from Genealogical and Family History of Northern New York (Lewis Historical Publishing Co., 1910) [traces the ancestors of Camilla (Quackenbush) Cristman back to King Edward III of England]

New York State Assembly
Preceded by E. Bert Pullman	New York State Assembly; Herkimer County; 1914	Succeeded by Selden C. Clobridge
New York State Senate
Preceded by Seth G. Heacock	New York State Senate; 32nd District; 1915–1916	Succeeded by Theodore Douglas Robinson
