= Seth G. Heacock =

American politician

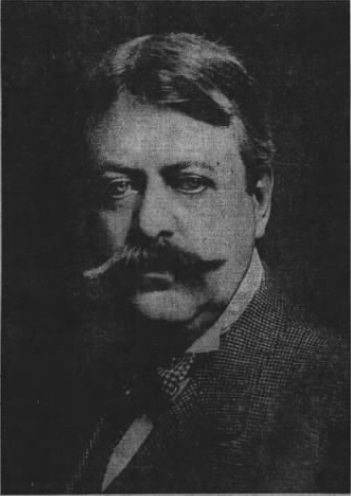
- Heacock c. 1914

Member of the New York Senate
- In office January 1, 1907 – December 31, 1914
- Preceded by: Walter L. Brown
- Succeeded by: Franklin W. Cristman
- Constituency: 33rd district (1907–1908); 32nd district (1909–1914)

Personal details
- Born: March 1, 1857 Buffalo, New York
- Died: December 4, 1928 (aged 71) New York City, New York
- Party: Republican

Seth Grosvenor Heacock (March 1, 1857 – December 4, 1928) was an American politician from New York.

== Life ==
He was born on March 1, 1857, in Buffalo, New York, the son of Rev. Grosvenor W. Heacock D.D., a Presbyterian minister, and Nancy Rice (Stone) Heacock. He graduated from Hamilton College in 1880. On July 22, 1880, he married Ida May Walker (born 1858), and they had two children. They lived in Ilion, Herkimer County, New York, and became wealthy after oil was found on a farm he owned in Ohio.

Heacock was a member of the New York State Senate from 1907 to 1914, sitting in the 130th, 131st (both 33rd D.), 132nd, 133rd, 134th, 135th, 136th and 137th New York State Legislatures (all six 32nd D.).

He ran for Lieutenant Governor of New York in the Republican primaries for the State elections in 1914 and 1918, but was both times defeated by Edward Schoeneck.

Heacock was a presidential elector in 1916, voting for Charles Evans Hughes and Charles W. Fairbanks.

Heacock died on December 4, 1928, in Presbyterian Hospital in Manhattan.

== Sources ==
New York State Senate
Preceded by Walter L. Brown	New York State Senate; 33rd District; 1907–1908	Succeeded by James A. Emerson
Preceded by James A. Emerson	New York State Senate; 32nd District; 1909–1914	Succeeded by Franklin W. Cristman
