= 1914 United States Senate election in New York =

- November 3, 1914
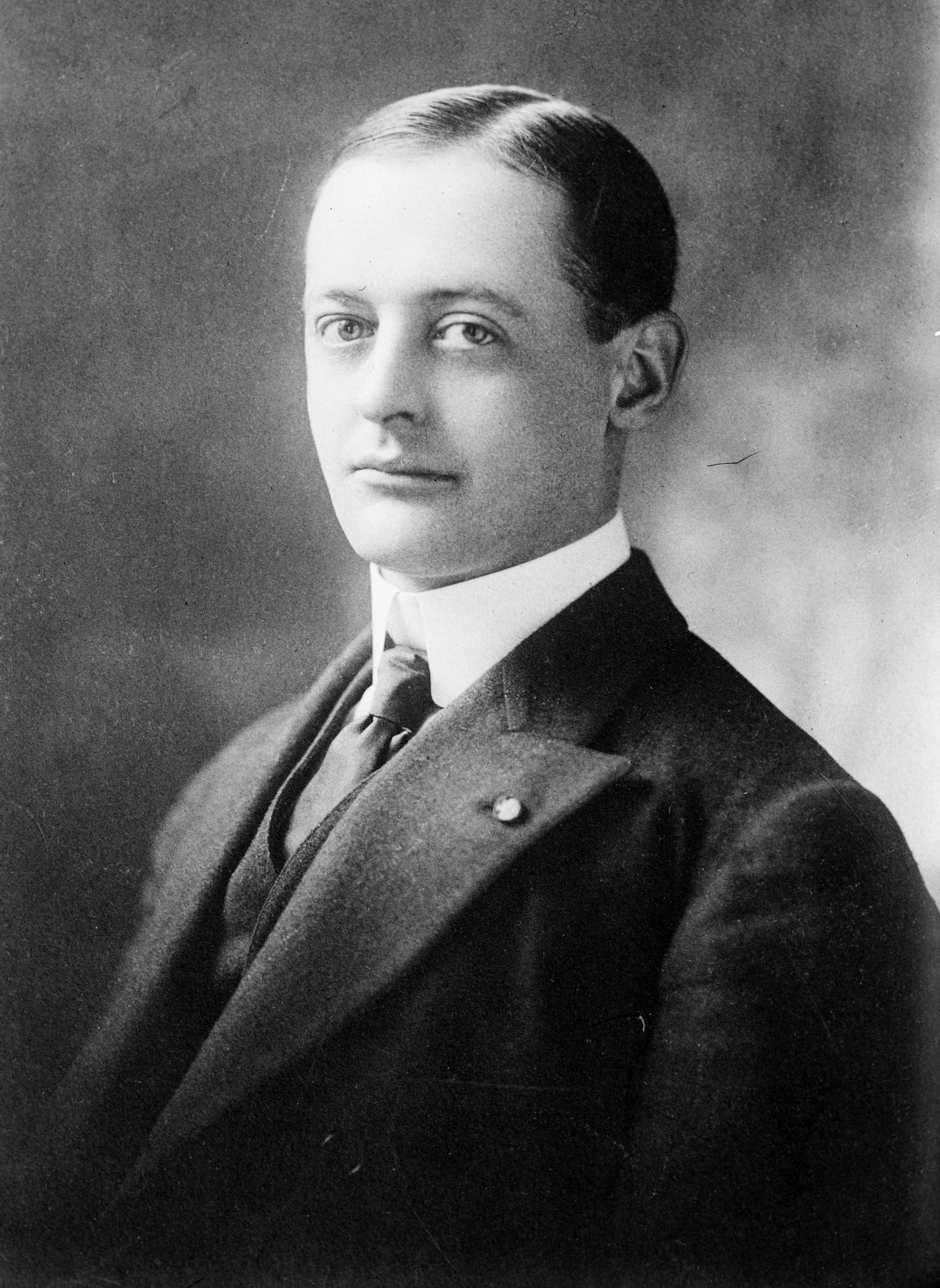

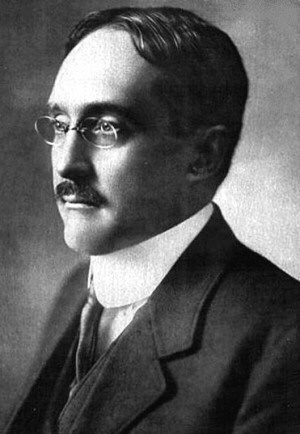
Nominee	James W. Wadsworth	James Watson Gerard
Party	Republican	Democratic
Popular vote	639,112	571,419
Percentage	47.04%	42.06%
- County results Wadsworth: 40–50% 50–60% 60–70% Gerard: 40–50% 50–60% 60–70%
Senator before election
Elihu Root
Republican
Elected Senator
James W. Wadsworth
Republican

The 1914 United States Senate election in New York was held on November 3. Incumbent Republican Senator Elihu Root chose not to seek re-election. James Wolcott Wadsworth Jr. was elected to succeed Root, defeating Democrat James Watson Gerard.

Primary elections were held on September 28. These were the first direct primaries (in which party members chose each candidate individually rather than as part of a slate) in the history of New York state. Wadsworth narrowly defeated William M. Calder for the Republican nomination. Gerard won the Democratic nomination in a landslide over Franklin Delano Roosevelt, a rare setback in the political career of the future President of the United States.

This election for Senate was the first decided by popular vote in New York, as required following the passage of the Seventeenth Amendment.

== Republican primary ==
=== Candidates ===
- William M. Calder, U.S. Representative from Brooklyn
- David Jayne Hill, former U.S. Assistant Secretary of State and Ambassador to Switzerland, Luxembourg, the Netherlands, and Germany
- James Wolcott Wadsworth Jr., State Assemblyman from Livingston County and former Speaker of the Assembly

==== Withdrew ====
- Harvey D. Hinman, former state senator from Binghamton (ran for governor)

==== Declined ====
- Elihu Root, incumbent senator since 1909

=== Campaign ===
The Republican primary was a skirmish in the feud between the conservative party establishment led by William Barnes Jr. and the progressive followers of Theodore Roosevelt, brought to new heights by Roosevelt's July editorial denouncing Barnes as corrupt.

Calder announced his campaign on June 16 with the full backing of the Kings County Republican Committee and the understanding that Senator Root would not accept re-nomination. Another progressive, Harvey D. Hinman, entered the race with the apparent support of Theodore Roosevelt and more established progressives, who urged Calder to clear the field for him. After Root's refusal was publicly substantiated, James W. Wadsworth became a likely candidate for the conservative party establishment, given that he had become Speaker of the Assembly with then-President Roosevelt's support years prior.

Following Wadsworth's entry into the race, Hinman withdrew and Calder successfully convinced him to run for governor.

Roosevelt's feud with Barnes played a major role in the race. Progressive candidates attacked Wadsworth and gubernatorial candidate Charles S. Whitman for their association with Barnes. By election day, the Barnes faction was expected to succeed through its strength outside of New York City.

=== Results ===
Results by county Wadsworth: 40–50%; 50–60%; 60–70%; 70–80%; 80–90%; Calder: 30–40%; 40–50%; 50–60%; 60–70%; 80–90%; Hill: 80–90%

1914 Republican Senate Primary
Party	Candidate	Votes	%
Republican	James Wolcott Wadsworth Jr.	89,960	42.85%
Republican	William M. Calder	82,895	39.48%
Republican	David Jayne Hill	37,102	17.67%
Total votes		209,957	100.00%

=== Aftermath ===
Following Wadsworth's victory, some progressive Republicans bolted the party for the Progressive organization.

Calder would be elected to the Senate himself in 1916, serving alongside Wadsworth for one term.

== Democratic primary ==
=== Candidates ===
- James Watson Gerard, United States Ambassador to Germany
- James S. McDonough
- Franklin Delano Roosevelt, Assistant Secretary of the Navy and former State Senator from Hyde Park

==== Declined ====
- William Randolph Hearst, multi-millionaire newspaper publisher and perennial candidate

=== Campaign ===
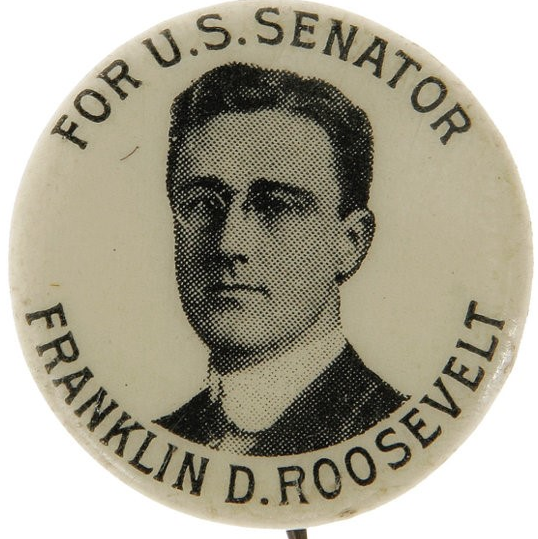
A young Franklin Roosevelt was the early favorite for the Democratic nomination until the eleventh-hour entry of James Watson Gerard as the candidate of Tammany Hall.

Assistant Secretary of the Navy Franklin Delano Roosevelt was an early candidate for the Senate, privately expressing his interest in both the Democratic and Progressive nominations following Root's retirement. Roosevelt had previously hoped to run for Governor against Tammany Hall incumbent Martin H. Glynn but demurred after he failed to win the support of President Woodrow Wilson. His entry into the campaign was delayed in June by the assassination of Franz Ferdinand and early movements towards World War I.

Roosevelt finally announced his candidacy on August 13 at the urging of Treasury Secretary William Gibbs McAdoo. Roosevelt, who had been the leader of the reform faction in the State Senate years prior, spent all of August confident that he would be the Democratic nominee and did not bother to appear at his campaign's kickoff rally on September 2.

In late August, Roosevelt won the endorsement of Governor Glynn, a coup in his efforts to reconcile the reformers with Tammany. However, Tammany surprised Roosevelt and the national party by putting forward U.S. Ambassador to Germany James Watson Gerard as a candidate on September 6, the penultimate day to file for the ballot.

Roosevelt was caught unprepared by Gerard's candidacy, which had the White House's blessing. Gerard was also independently wealthy and had a reputation for honesty that gave him distance from Tammany corruption. Most importantly, Gerard was able to avoid a personal undertaking by attending to his duties in Berlin, leaving Roosevelt no room to criticize him.

Roosevelt attempted a last-minute campaign tour but made little impression on voters. One upstate paper reported, "When compared to such a man as Elihu Root he cuts a sorry figure as a great statesman."

=== Results ===
Results by county Gerard: Gerard 30–40%; Gerard 40–50%; Gerard 50–60%; Gerard 60–70%; Gerard 70–80%; Gerard 80–90%; Roosevelt: Roosevelt 30–40%; Roosevelt 40–50%; Roosevelt 50–60%; Roosevelt 60–70%; Roosevelt 70–80%

1914 Democratic Senate Primary
Party	Candidate	Votes	%
Democratic	James Watson Gerard	133,815	62.08%
Democratic	Franklin Delano Roosevelt	63,879	29.64%
Democratic	James S. McDonough	17,862	8.29%
Total votes		154,221	100.00%

== Progressive primary ==
=== Candidates ===
- Bainbridge Colby, former State Assemblyman and founder of the Progressive Party

=== Results ===
1914 Progressive Senate Primary
Party	Candidate	Votes	%
Progressive	Bainbridge Colby	27,517	100.00%
Total votes		27,517	100.00%

== General election ==
=== Candidates ===
- Erwin A. Aucher (Socialist Labor)
- Francis E. Baldwin, perennial candidate (Prohibition)
- Bainbridge Colby, former State Assemblyman (Progressive)
- James Watson Gerard, United States Ambassador to Germany (Democratic)
- Charles Edward Russell, investigative journalist and co-founder of the NAACP (Socialist)
- James Wolcott Wadsworth Jr., State Assemblyman and former Speaker of the Assembly (Republican)

=== Results ===
1914 United States Senate election in New York
Party	Candidate	Votes	%
Republican	James Wolcott Wadsworth Jr.	639,112	47.04%
Democratic	James Watson Gerard	571,419	42.06%
Progressive	Bainbridge Colby	61,977	4.56%
Socialist	Charles Edward Russell	55,266	4.07%
Prohibition	Francis E. Baldwin	27,813	2.05%
Socialist Labor	Erwin A. Aucher	3,064	0.23%
Total votes		1,358,651	100.00%
