= Elihu Root =

American politician, statesman, and Nobel Laureate (1845–1937)

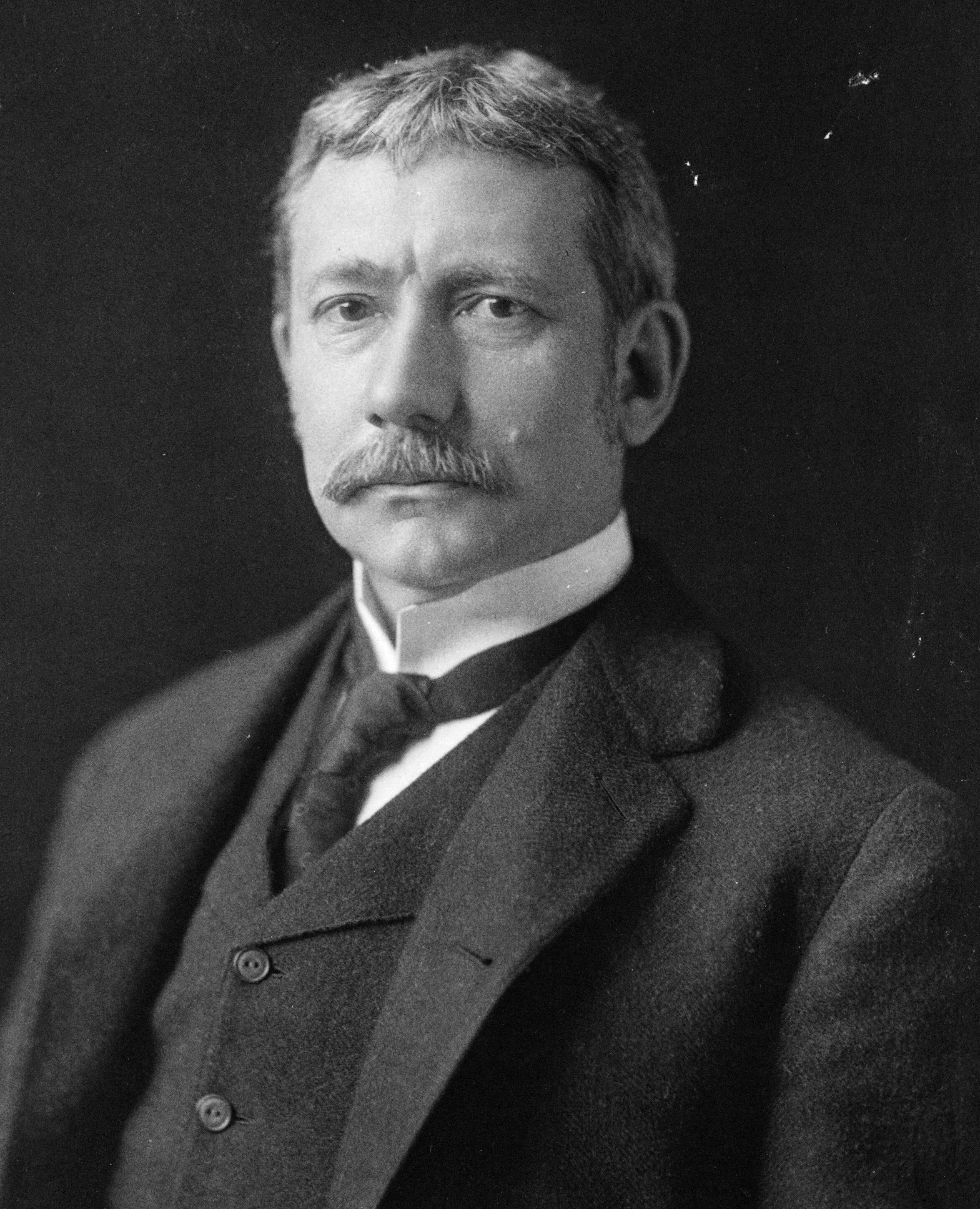
- Portrait by George Prince, 1902

38th United States Secretary of State
- In office July 19, 1905 – January 27, 1909
- President: Theodore Roosevelt
- Preceded by: John Hay
- Succeeded by: Robert Bacon

41st United States Secretary of War
- In office August 1, 1899 – January 31, 1904
- President: William McKinley; Theodore Roosevelt
- Preceded by: Russell A. Alger
- Succeeded by: William Howard Taft

United States Senator from New York
- In office March 4, 1909 – March 3, 1915
- Preceded by: Thomas C. Platt
- Succeeded by: James Wadsworth

United States Attorney for the Southern District of New York
- In office March 12, 1883 – July 6, 1885
- President: Chester A. Arthur; Grover Cleveland
- Preceded by: Stewart L. Woodford
- Succeeded by: William Dorsheimer

Personal details
- Born: February 15, 1845 Clinton, New York, U.S.
- Died: February 7, 1937 (aged 91) New York City, U.S.
- Party: Republican
- Spouse: Clara Frances Wales (m. 1878)
- Relations: Oren Root II (brother)
- Children: Edith; Elihu Jr.; Edward
- Education: Hamilton College (BA, MA); New York University (LLB)
- Awards: Nobel Peace Prize (1912)

Elihu Root (/ˈɛlɪhjuː ˈruːt/; February 15, 1845 – February 7, 1937) was an American lawyer, Republican politician, and statesman who served as the 41st United States Secretary of War under presidents William McKinley and Theodore Roosevelt and the 38th United States Secretary of State, also under Roosevelt. In both positions as well as a long legal career, he pioneered the American practice of international law. Root is sometimes considered the prototype of the 20th-century political "wise man", advising presidents on a range of foreign and domestic issues. He also served as a United States Senator from New York and received the 1912 Nobel Peace Prize.

Root was a leading New York City lawyer who moved frequently between high-level appointed government positions in Washington, D.C., and private-sector legal practice in New York. He headed organizations such as the Carnegie Endowment for International Peace and the American Society of International Law.

As Secretary of War from 1899 to 1904, Root administered colonial possessions won in the Spanish–American War. Root favored a paternalistic approach to colonial administration, emphasizing technology, engineering, and disinterested public service. He helped craft the Foraker Act of 1900, the Platt Amendment of 1901, and the Philippine Organic Act (1902). Root also modernized the Army into a professional military apparatus with a general staff, restructured the National Guard, and established the U.S. Army War College.

Root returned to the Roosevelt administration as Secretary of State from 1905 to 1909. He modernized the consular service by minimizing patronage, maintained the Open Door Policy in China, promoted friendly relations with Latin America, and resolved frictions with Japan over the immigration and treatment of Japanese citizens to the West Coast of the United States. He negotiated 24 bilateral international arbitration treaties, which led to the creation of the Permanent Court of International Justice.

As a United States senator from New York, Root was a conservative supporter of President William Howard Taft, playing a central role in Taft's nomination to a second term at the 1912 Republican National Convention. By 1916, he was a leading proponent of military preparedness with the expectation that the United States would enter World War I. President Woodrow Wilson sent him to Russia in 1917 in an unsuccessful effort to establish an alliance with the new revolutionary government that had replaced the Czar. Root supported Wilson's vision of the League of Nations but with reservations along the lines proposed by Republican senator Henry Cabot Lodge.

== Early life and education ==
Elihu Root was born on February 15, 1845, in Clinton, Oneida County, New York, to Oren Root and Nancy Whitney Buttrick, both of English descent. His father was a professor of mathematics at Hamilton College.

Elihu studied at local schools, including the Clinton Grammar School and the Williston Seminary, where he was a classmate of G. Stanley Hall, before enrolling at Hamilton. He joined the Sigma Phi Society and was elected to Phi Beta Kappa society. After graduation, Root was an instructor of physical education for two years at Williston Seminary and taught for one year at the Rome Free Academy.

Despite his parents' encouragement to become a Presbyterian minister, Root moved to New York City in 1865 with his brother Wally and sought a career in the law. He enrolled at New York University School of Law and earned money teaching American history at elite girls' schools. At the time, most law students in the United States applied for admission to the bar after one year of study, but Root stayed on for a second year, essentially a private tutelage under Professor John Norton Pomeroy. He graduated in 1867 with a Bachelor of Laws and was admitted to the bar on June 18, 1867.

== Legal and business career ==
Upon his admission to the bar, Root completed a year of unpaid apprenticeship at the leading New York City firm Mann and Parsons. In 1868, he and several other young lawyers founded the firm of Strahan & Root with offices on Pine Street. He had various partners through 1897, when a disagreement led to the dissolution of his firm and the formation of Root, Howard, Winthrop & Stimson, a predecessor of the modern firm Pillsbury Winthrop Shaw Pittman.

His early work was assorted and menial, but expanded rapidly after he met John J. Donaldson, the president of the Bank of North America, through their pastor. Donaldson hired Root as a Latin tutor and was impressed with his ability as a lawyer, eventually sending him personal matters and small cases for the Bank. In March 1869, Root was hired to reorganize the bank to acquire a state charter. Soon after, Alexander Compton was elevated to the partnership, and the firm was renamed Compton & Root. Root's public profile and professional reputation were enhanced by his defense of Tammany Hall boss William M. Tweed, and Compton & Root grew throughout the 1870s into a varied practice with a primary focus on banks, railroads, wills and estates, and municipal government.

Root was admitted to the bar of the Supreme Court of the United States in 1881. In 1883, President Chester A. Arthur appointed him U.S. Attorney for the Southern District of New York, the chief government attorney in New York City. As U.S. Attorney, Root headed the prosecutions for the Ward and Grant fraud which precipitated the Panic of 1884.

Through 1899, Root took on many other prominent and wealthy clients, including Jay Gould, Chester A. Arthur, Charles Anderson Dana, William C. Whitney, Thomas Fortune Ryan, the Havemeyer family, Charlie Delmonico, and E. H. Harriman. In 1889, Root advised Speaker of the United States House of Representatives Thomas Brackett Reed on his controversial efforts to revise the House rules.

On January 19, 1898, Root was elected a member of the executive committee of the newly formed North American Trust Company.

After moving to Washington in 1899, Root never again became partner in a firm. His public career lasted through 1915, when Root returned to practice in an of counsel role at his son's firm of Root, Clark, Buckner & Howland. Around that time, Root was elected the 38th president of the American Bar Association.

=== Defense of Tweed ring ===
In December 1871, Tammany Hall boss William M. Tweed was indicted on charges of deceit and fraud in connection to his real estate dealings and political corruption. Tweed retained eminent defense counsel led by David Dudley Field; Root joined the case on behalf of Tweed's co-defendant James Ingersoll, a furniture manufacturer who stood accused of fraudulently billing the city government for millions of dollars. Root's law partner, Alexander Compton, was Ingersoll's cousin by marriage, and Compton turned the case over to Root due to his courtroom experience. Despite his family's dismay, he accepted the case and joined Tweed's defense in addition to Ingersoll's.

The Tweed case stretched on for years, with the first trial commencing more than fifteen months after the indictment and ending in a hung jury. Four more indictments were brought in November 1873 after the defense's failed attempt to get judge Noah Davis to recuse himself. Root took a minor role in the proceedings, examining jurors and occasionally cross-examining the prosecution witnesses. The jury returned a guilty verdict on two hundred and four counts; Davis imposed a sentence of twelve years and a $12,750 fine, later reduced on appeal. Three of Tweed's attorneys were fined for contempt of court; Root was not among them. Instead, Davis addressed the junior attorneys:

"I know how young lawyers are apt to follow their seniors. ... [Elihu Root and Willard Bartlett] displayed great ability during the trial. I shall impose no penalty, except what they may find in these few words of advice: I ask you young gentlemen, to remember that good faith to a client never can justify or require bad faith to your own consciences, and that however good a thing it may be to be known as successful and great lawyers, it is even a better thing to be known as honest men."

Root took a more active role in the Ingersoll defense, successfully appealing a jurisdictional issue to the New York Court of Appeals. Judge Allen remarked to Root's co-counsel that Root's argument "was not excelled by any in the case." Ingersoll was ultimately sentenced to five years but was pardoned by Governor Samuel J. Tilden.

After Root had risen to national prominence, his work on the Tweed case formed the basis for public attacks from newspapers owned and directed by William Randolph Hearst, particularly after Root opposed Hearst's 1906 campaign for governor. Hearst exaggerated Root's role in the case and implied he had advised Tweed on political corruption before his indictment. Root's fee in the case, paid partly in cash and partly by a real estate transfer, also came in for criticism, with Hearst papers implying that Root had inherited Tweed's mansion. In fact, Tweed was penniless after paying the fines assessed against him, and his heavily encumbered real estate holdings were his lone assets.

=== U.S. Attorney for the Southern District (1883–85) ===
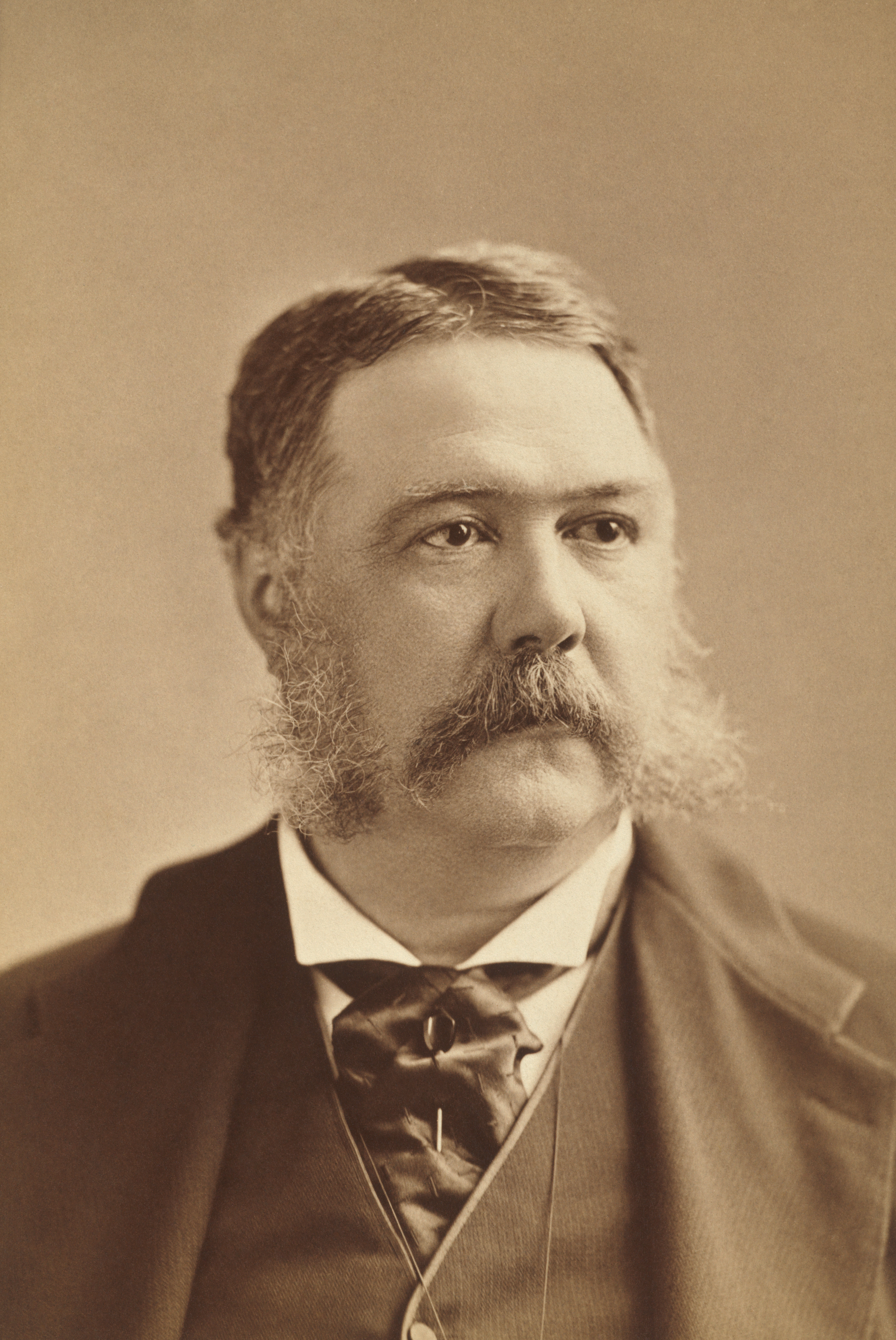
Though Root avoided politics to the extent possible, his relationship with President Chester A. Arthur culminated in appointment as U.S. Attorney for the Southern District of New York.

Early in his legal career, Root joined the Union League Club, where he met a number of young New York Republicans. He avoided political office personally, believing that it would obstruct his legal career. As an example, he cited Robert H. Strahan, an early law partner who had entered state politics. "It ruined him as a lawyer," Root said in 1930. "He got in the habit politicians have of sitting around and talking instead of working." Nevertheless, after his 1878 marriage and move to East 55th Street, Root became actively involved in the Republican Party organization in his well-to-do State Assembly district. He also expanded his involvement at the Union League Club, where his father-in-law was an active member. In 1879, he was elected to the Club's executive committee.

Through the Club, Root met Chester A. Arthur, an experienced Manhattan attorney and the powerful Collector of the Port of New York. In 1879, Arthur and Alonzo B. Cornell persuaded Root to stand for the Court of Common Pleas. Root viewed the campaign as hopeless given the city's Democratic reputation, took no part in the campaign, and was relieved to lose the election. He never again stood for a popular election, other than as a delegate to party conventions, but his association with Arthur rapidly advanced his national profile. In 1880, Arthur was elected Vice President of the United States with Root's support. Root attended the inauguration and was among the friends at Arthur's New York home on September 19, 1881, when the Vice President was informed that President James A. Garfield had succumbed to an assassin's bullet and that he had succeeded to the presidency. In 1881, Root encountered another future President: Theodore Roosevelt, who was elected to the State Assembly from Root's district. Root actively supported the young Roosevelt's career by signing Roosevelt's nomination papers, aiding in efforts to sideline a rival candidate, and speaking on behalf of his 1886 mayoral campaign.

Though many observers expected Arthur would offer Root appointment as Attorney General or to another cabinet post, in March 1883 he appointed Root United States Attorney for the Southern District of New York. There was limited opposition to his nomination given that Arthur was trying to force out a political rival, Stewart L. Woodford, who had been appointed by Garfield, but he was approved by the Senate and sworn in on March 12. The role was part-time, with Root devoting his mornings to the Attorney's office and his afternoons to his private practice. Many of his cases were suits for the refund of customs duties paid under protest.

==== International law ====
As U.S. Attorney, Root had his first exposure to international law, which would become the cornerstone of his public legacy. He prosecuted two cases for violation of United States neutrality laws against vessels for aiding Haitian and Colombian insurgents and defended the government in the Head Money Cases, a challenge to the Immigration Act of 1882 on grounds that it conflicted with international treaties with the Republic of the Netherlands. The suit was appealed to the Supreme Court, where the government prevailed.

==== Ward and Grant prosecutions ====
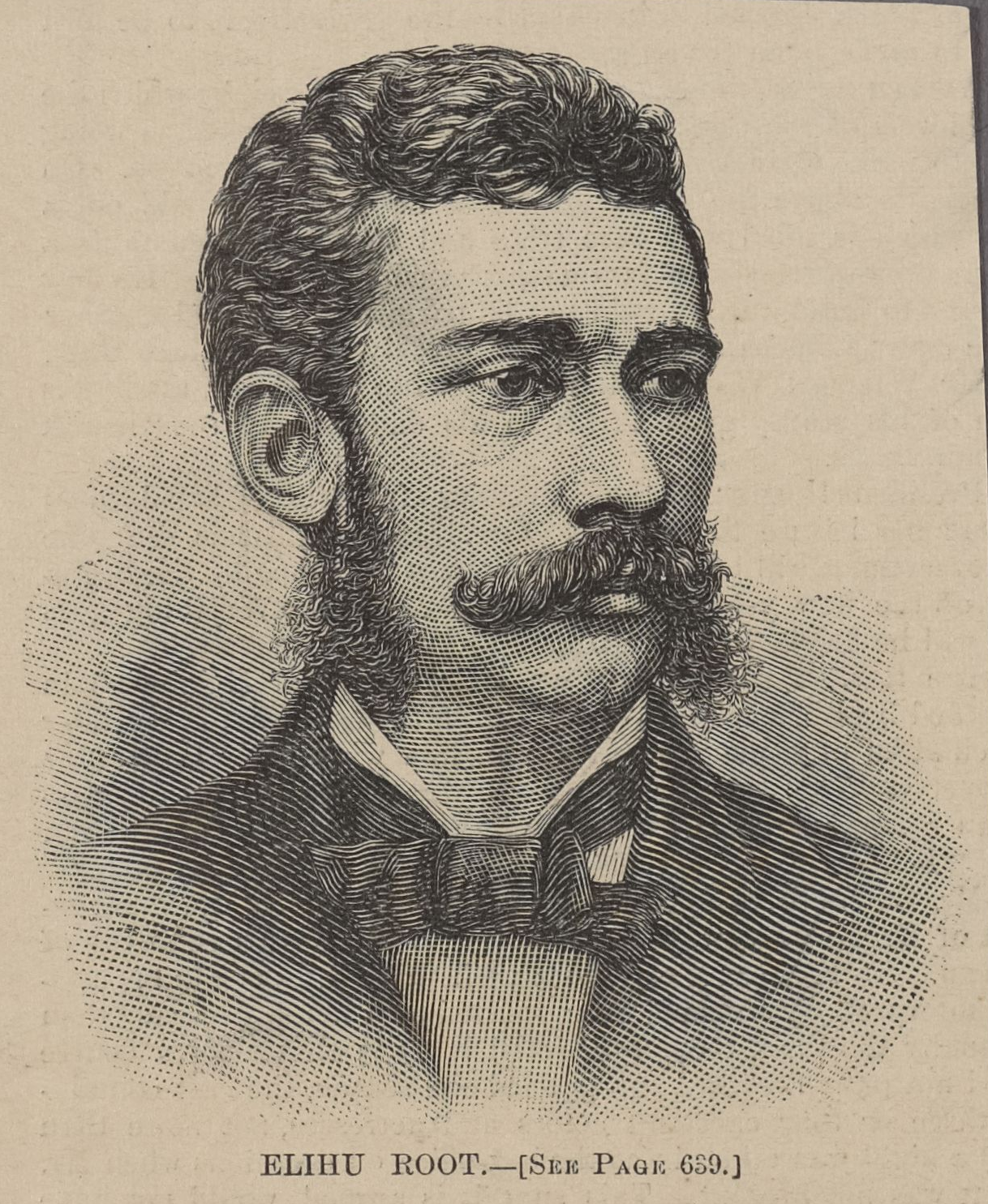
Portrait published in Harper's Weekly, October 2, 1886

Root's highest-profile case as U.S. Attorney was the prosecution for embezzlement of James C. Fish, a partner in Ward and Grant, a Ponzi scheme trading on the name of former President Ulysses S. Grant and his son, Ulysses Jr. The collapse of Ward and Grant precipitated the Panic of 1884. Fish offered a defense of ignorance, claiming that he had been fooled by the scheme, just as the Grants had been. For six weeks, Root devoted his full attention to the case, including the deposition of former President Grant, who died before a verdict was reached. The jury returned a guilty verdict after a night of deliberation, and Fish was sentenced to ten years in prison.

The Fish verdict won Root praise in the press. According to the New York Sun, "The manner in which he conducted the prosecution... has won him high praise wherever reports of the trial have been published. The cross-examination of the defendant was characterized by exceptional acumen and professional skill, and was made much more effective than it would otherwise have been by Mr. Root's evident familiarity with the details of the banking business." The Mail and Express wrote: "The credit of the result must be awarded mainly to the District Attorney." In particular, Root was credited with vindicating the late President: "The unspeakable meanness of the conspirators in trying to save themselves by implicating General Grant in their fraudulent transactions... was dealt with in terms of deserved scorn and severity by the District Attorney."

Just before his resignation, Root successfully won an indictment of Fish's co-conspirator, Ferdinand Ward. He quietly submitted his resignation to President Grover Cleveland on July 1, 1885. Two other members of the conspiracy were later prosecuted, and Root returned from private life to assist with the prosecutions.

== Secretary of War (1899–1904) ==
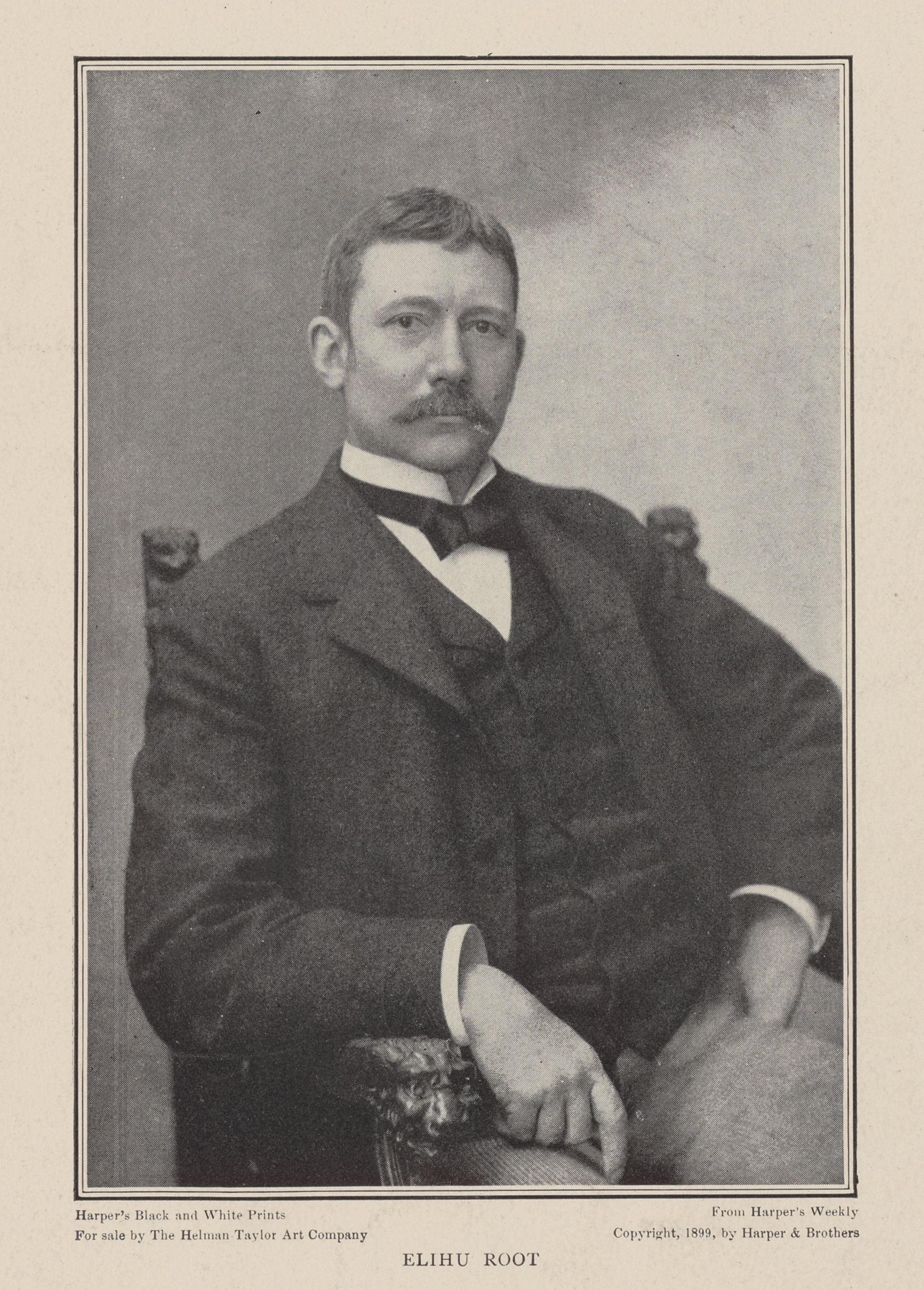
Portrait published in Harper's Weekly, 1899

In July 1899, President William McKinley offered Root a position in his cabinet as Secretary of War. The offer came on the heels of the Spanish–American War. In general, the war had been a success, but Secretary Russell A. Alger had come under heavy criticism for his management of the department, and McKinley had requested his resignation. At first, Root declined, but accepted when he realized "McKinley wanted a lawyer to run the governments of the islands."

=== Puerto Rico and conflicts of interest ===
When Root assumed office as Secretary of War in August 1899, he was widely recognized as "probably the best corporation lawyer in the United States." His client roster presented a direct conflict of interest with the policies he would oversee in Puerto Rico: Root had served as personal attorney to John Pierpont Morgan and to Henry Havemeyer, president of the American Sugar Refining Company (the Sugar Trust), which dominated 100% of the American sugar industry and held extensive interests in Puerto Rico and Cuba. He had also led the legal reorganization of the Sugar Trust in 1890, and had represented Standard Oil, the Tobacco Trust, and the Bank of North America.

Root was also a member of the Metropolitan Club in Washington, D.C., alongside J.P. Morgan, Theodore Roosevelt, Henry Cabot Lodge, and General Nelson Appleton Miles, who had led the military invasion of Puerto Rico on July 25, 1898. As Secretary of War, Root ratified in 1899 the exclusive franchise granted to The New York and Porto Rico Steamship Co., a corporation controlled by associates of J.P. Morgan, giving it the sole right to operate the only concrete dock in the port of San Juan, consolidating a maritime monopoly over Puerto Rico trade that lasted more than fifty years.

Root established civilian governments in the new American territories of Cuba, the Philippines, and Puerto Rico, and modernized the Department of War. His rapid success and popularity led Root to become the first choice of the Republican National Committee for the vice presidential nomination in 1900 by December 1899, but McKinley had objected to losing his Secretary of War, and Root himself preferred to stay in the Cabinet. The nomination ultimately went to Theodore Roosevelt over his own objection and led to his ascension as President upon the assassination of McKinley in 1901.

During the Boxer Rebellion of 1900, Root handled foreign policy matters for Secretary of State John Hay, who was ill.

Root resigned from the cabinet on February 1, 1904, and returned to private practice as a lawyer. He was succeeded by William Howard Taft.

=== Military reforms ===
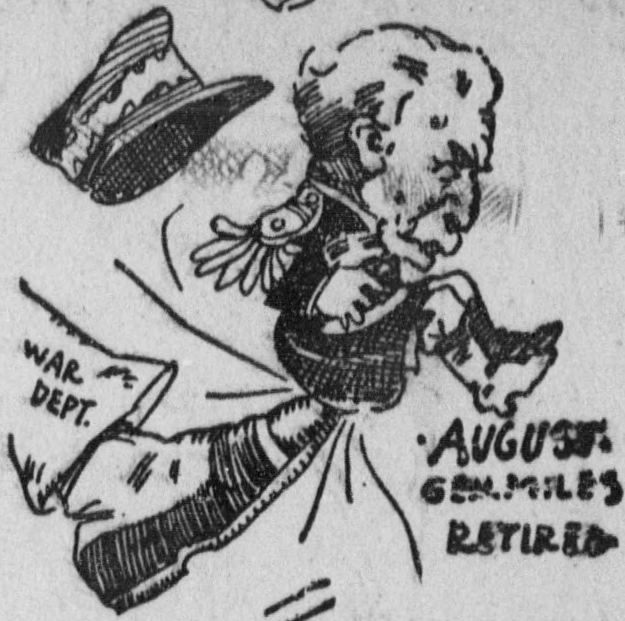
A Bob Satterfield cartoon depicts the forced retirement of Commanding General Nelson A. Miles.

At Root's appointment, the Department of War had a public reputation for inefficiency, corruption, and scandals which had characterized Alger's tenure and the war. His immediate focus was reforming military administration, which he viewed as a prerequisite for success in territorial administration or any future military campaign. Though the United States had just completed a successful, brief military campaign against Spain, its officer corps was still organized on peacetime terms; Root set about permanently placing the United States military on a war footing. Root worked closely with Adjutant General Henry Clark Corbin and William Harding Carter.

His chief obstacle was Commanding General of the Army Nelson A. Miles; the offices of Commanding General and Secretary of War had long been engaged in a power struggle, and Root's reforms would directly implicate Miles's authority. Root proposed the establishment of a General Staff led by the office of Chief of Staff of the United States Army. The Chief of Staff was to be a general officer of the Army answerable directly to the Secretary of War and the President. The Chief of Staff would carry out the Secretary's instructions and supervise discipline and maneuvers. The reorganization was accomplished by the Efficiency in Militia Act of 1903 (Dick Act). Root also changed the procedures for promotions and also devised the principle of rotating officers from staff to line. Working with Secretary of the Navy William Henry Moody, Root established closer coordination between the Army and Navy, including the establishment of a joint board under General Orders No. 107.

Root also sought to enhance military training. To that end, he enlarged the United States Military Academy, established the U.S. Army War College, U.S. Army Command and General Staff College, and U.S. Army General Staff, and additional training posts, especially Fort Leavenworth. He likewise provided for additional National Guard officer training programs at Fort Leavenworth for those volunteer officers who had shown capacity during the Spanish–American War; per Root's instructions, the National Guard would also be equipped with the same arms as the regular army and examinations would be administered to qualify members for higher command.

=== Territorial administration ===
As a result of the Spanish–American War, the United States held military control of Cuba, the Philippines, and Puerto Rico. As Secretary of War, Root was tasked with the administration of martial law on the islands and the eventual transition to civilian government. Under the terms of the Teller Amendment, the United States was additionally bound to return "control of [Cuba] to its people." Particularly in the Philippines, the United States also faced militant insurgency from natives who resisted their transfer from one foreign empire to another.

He worked out the procedures for turning Cuba over to the Cubans, ensured a charter of government for the Philippines, and eliminated tariffs on goods imported to the United States from Puerto Rico. When the Anti-Imperialist League attacked American policies in the Philippines, Root defended the policies and counterattacked the critics, saying they prolonged the insurgency.

For this work, he relied on legal advisor Charles Edward Magoon. Magoon had been hired at the Bureau of Insular Affairs by Root's predecessor, Russell Alger, and drafted an internal report taking the official position that residents of Puerto Rico, the Philippines, and other territories became subject to all the rights granted by the Constitution. After Root's appointment, Magoon controversially revised the department's legal position to require an Act of Congress, as had been passed in the cases of the Northwest Territory and Louisiana Purchase, to regulate the rights of territorial subjects. This revised position was upheld by the Supreme Court in a series of landmark decisions collectively known as the Insular Cases.

In Cuba, the American challenge was to arrange for the transition to civilian government while preserving order and guaranteeing protection against international predation. Root established the island's first republican form of government under the command of Leonard Wood. This was accomplished by the Cuban constitution of 1901, and the American military government withdrew in 1902.

==== Philippine–American War ====
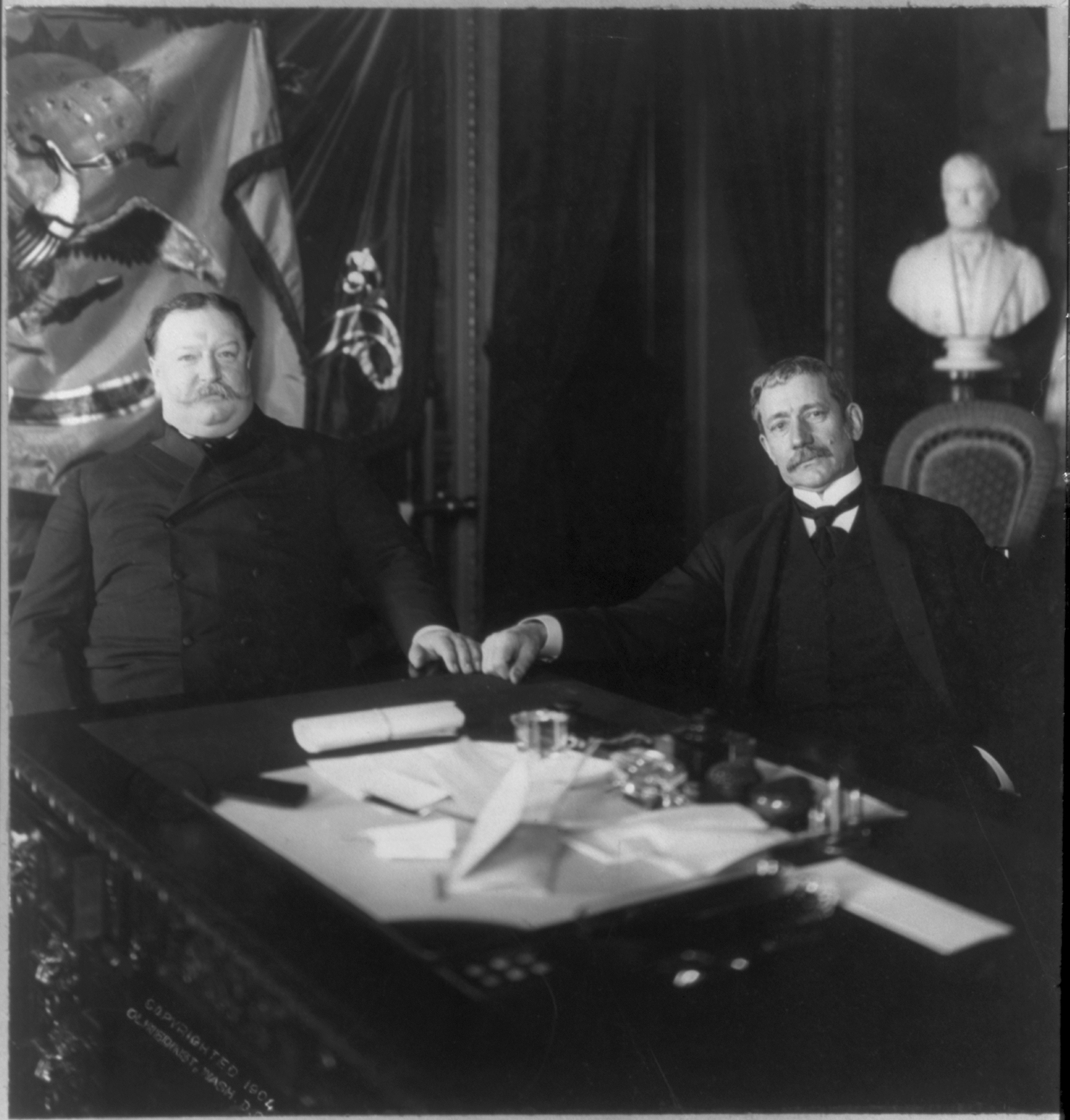
Root and his successor, William Howard Taft, c. 1904

Root's primary administrative challenge as Secretary of War was the effort to establish control of the Philippine Islands. Though American government of the islands was internationally recognized under the Treaty of Paris, the native independence movement resisted imperial control. Relative to Cuba and Puerto Rico, the islands' distance and the relative underdevelopment of Spanish institutions made administration far more challenging.

Root's primary goal was the establishment of a civilian governor-general (as had been applied in Cuba) rather than a military governor; however, he felt that education of the native population was necessary before such a transition could be successful. In 1900, Root guided the establishment of the Philippine commission, led by William Howard Taft, as a move toward autonomous civil government. The first step in his proposed process was the establishment of municipal governments and administrative divisions. The commission was to be guided by the principles of the Virginia Declaration of Rights.

=== Alaskan boundary dispute ===
In addition to his duties as Secretary of War, Root was one of three Americans appointed by President Roosevelt (with Henry Cabot Lodge and George Turner) to an international arbitration court to resolve the boundary dispute between Alaska and Great Britain. The dispute arose as a result of the Klondike Gold Rush of 1900, which heightened interest in the region and tensions over the exact boundary between the regions.

On October 20, 1903, the dispute was resolved by British jurist Richard Webster, 1st Viscount Alverstone in favor of the United States on every point of contention.

== Secretary of State (1905–1909) ==
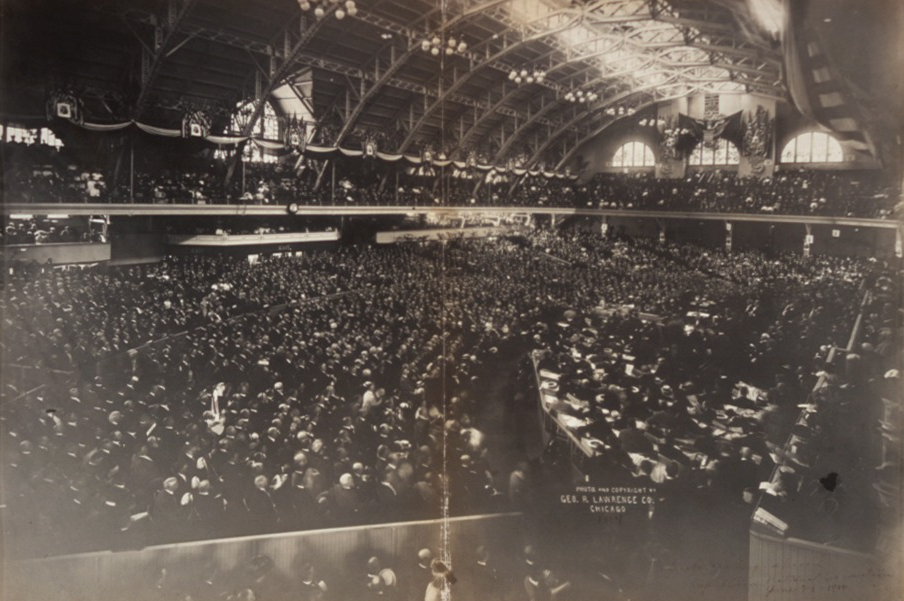
Root gives the opening speech at the 1904 Republican National Convention

Root's retirement from public office was brief, but he remained active in public life, delivering speeches in defense of Roosevelt's policies in Panama and in the Northern Securities case. After Mark Hanna died in February 1904, shortly after Root's resignation, Root declined to succeed him as chair of the Republican National Committee. He also repeatedly refused efforts to draft him as the Republican candidate for Governor in the 1904 election; instead, he focused on securing Roosevelt's nomination to a full term at the national convention, where he delivered the opening speech.

After the death of John Hay, President Roosevelt named Root as United States Secretary of State and he returned to the cabinet on July 7, 1905. As secretary, Root reformed the consular service, placing it under the civil service. He maintained the Open Door Policy in the Far East.

He promoted peaceful relations with Latin American states and emphasized Western hemisphere solidarity. On a tour of Latin America in 1906, Root persuaded those governments to participate in the Hague Peace Conference. He worked with Japan to limit emigration to the United States and on dealings with China. He established the Root–Takahira Agreement. He worked with Great Britain in arbitration of issues between the United States and Canada on the Alaska boundary dispute, and competition in the North Atlantic fisheries. He was awarded the Nobel Peace Prize for his efforts for spreading the use of arbitration in resolving international disputes.

== United States Senator (1909–1915) ==
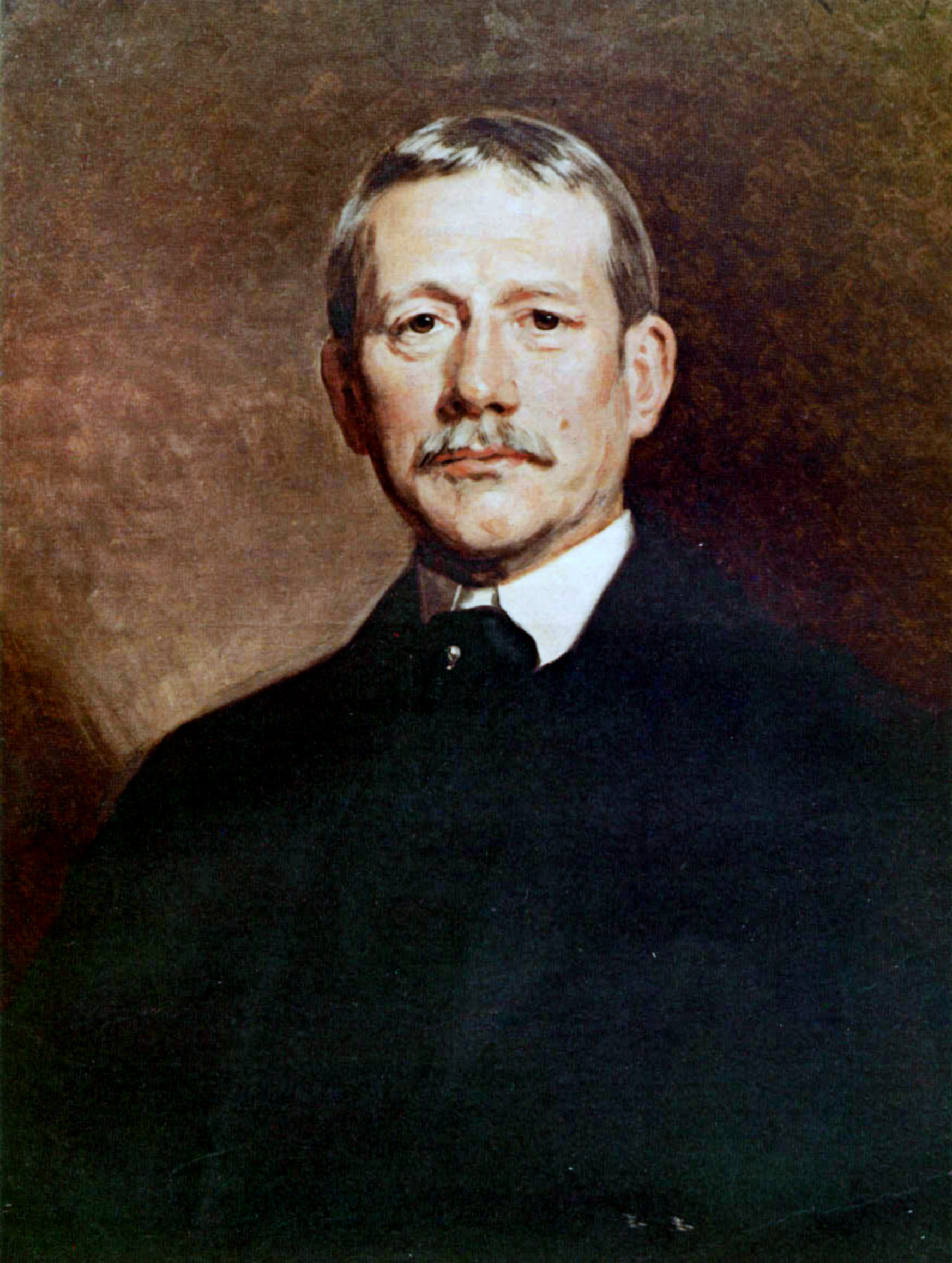
Portrait by Raimundo de Madrazo y Garreta, 1907

=== Overview ===
In January 1909, Root was elected by the legislature as a U.S. Senator from New York, serving from March 4, 1909, to March 3, 1915. He was a member of the Senate Committee on the Judiciary. He chose not to seek re-election in 1914.

During and after his Senate service, Root served as president of the Carnegie Endowment for International Peace, from 1910 to 1925.

In 1912, as a result of his work to bring nations together through arbitration and cooperation, Root received the Nobel Peace Prize.

=== Notable policy positions ===
In a 1910 letter published by The New York Times, Root supported the proposed income tax amendment, which was ratified as the Sixteenth Amendment to the United States Constitution:

It is said that a very large part of any income tax under the amendment would be paid by citizens of New York...

The reason why the citizens of New York will pay so large a part of the tax is that New York City is the chief financial and commercial center of a great country with vast resources and industrial activity. For many years Americans engaged in developing the wealth of all parts of the country have been going to New York to secure capital and market their securities and to buy their supplies. Thousands of men who have amassed fortunes in all sorts of enterprises in other states have gone to New York to live because they like the life of the city or because their distant enterprises require representation at the financial center. The incomes of New York are in a great measure derived from the country at large. A continual stream of wealth sets toward the great city from the mines and manufactories and railroads outside of New York.

=== Election of 1912 and judicial authority ===
During the 1912 presidential election, Root was placed in a difficult position regarding his two friends and political partners: William Howard Taft and Theodore Roosevelt. Beginning in 1910, Roosevelt had begun challenging the absolute authority of judicial review, arguing that the Supreme Court was using its power to strike down necessary reform legislation, as best represented in decisions like Lochner v. New York (1905). Taft, a lawyer and former judge (and future Supreme Court Chief Justice), was appalled, believing Roosevelt would be a danger to the nation's constitutional order if re-elected. Root, himself a lawyer and constitutional conservative, agreed with some of Roosevelt's criticisms on a personal level, but thought that attacking the court's authority in such an open way was extremely dangerous. He himself thought judicial review was "the most valuable contribution of America to political science." While he would not attack his former boss in public, he played a key role in the 1912 Republican National Convention as convention chairman. There, he formally counted the delegates that gave the nomination to Taft and offered a speech that aligned the Republican Party with a defense of the Supreme Court's authority. Though Roosevelt would still run as the Progressive "Bull Moose" Party nominee, the split in the Republican Party ensured his defeat. Thereafter, Root and Taft would play an important role in identifying the Republican Party with constitutional conservatism.

== World War I ==
At the outbreak of World War I in 1914, Root opposed neutrality. Root promoted the Preparedness Movement to get the United States ready for actual participation in the war. He was a leading advocate of American entry into the war on the side of the British and French because he feared the militarism of Germany would be bad for the world and for the United States. In 1915, Root served as president of the State of New York Constitutional Convention. In June 1916, he scotched talk that he might contend for the Republican presidential nomination, stating that he was too old to bear the burden of the Presidency. At the Republican National Convention, Root reached his peak strength of 103 votes on the first ballot. The Republican presidential nomination went to Charles Evans Hughes, who lost the election to the Democrat Woodrow Wilson.

=== Root Commission ===
In June 1917, at age 72, Root headed a mission to Russia sent by President Wilson to arrange American co-operation with the Russian Provisional Government headed by Alexander Kerensky. Root remained in Petrograd for close to a month and was not much impressed by what he saw. American financial aid to the new regime was possible only if the Russians would fight on the Allied side. The Russians, he said, "are sincere, kindly, good people but confused and dazed". He conditioned financial support on continuation of the war effort—undermining the moderates: "No fight, no loans." This provoked the Provisional Government to initiate failed offensives against Austrian forces in July 1917. The resulting steep decline in popularity of the Provisional Government opened the door for the Bolshevik party and the October Revolution.

Root was the founding chairman of the Council on Foreign Relations, established in 1918 in New York.

== Later career ==
In the Senate fight in 1919 over American membership in the League of Nations, Root supported Henry Cabot Lodge's proposal of membership with certain reservations that allowed the United States government to decide whether or not it would go to war. The United States never joined, but Root supported the League of Nations and served on the commission of jurists which created the Permanent Court of International Justice. In 1922, when Root was 77, President Warren G. Harding appointed him as a delegate to the Washington Naval Conference as part of an American team headed by Secretary of State Charles Evans Hughes. Root was a presidential elector for Calvin Coolidge in the 1924 presidential election.

Root also worked with Andrew Carnegie in programs for international peace and the advancement of science, becoming the first president of the Carnegie Endowment for International Peace. Root was also among the founders of the American Law Institute in 1923 and helped create The Hague Academy of International Law in the Netherlands. Root served as vice president of the American Peace Society, which publishes World Affairs, the oldest U.S. journal on international relations.

== Views ==
=== Opposition to women's suffrage ===
Root was a prominent opponent of women's suffrage. As chairman of the judiciary committee of a New York State constitutional convention in 1894, Root spoke against women's right to vote, and he worked to ensure that the right was not included in the state constitution. His argument then was used by anti-suffragists for many years thereafter: that the right to vote was not a natural right but simply "a means of government." He asserted that women were so different from men that they should not be granted the right to vote.

"Woman rules today by the sweet and noble influences of her character. Put woman into the arena of conflict and she abandons these great weapons which control the world, and she takes into her hands, feeble and nerveless for strife, weapons with which she is unfamiliar and which she is unable to wield. Woman in strife becomes hard, harsh, unlovable, repulsive; as far removed from that gentle creature to whom we all owe allegiance and to whom we confess submission, as the heaven is removed from the earth."

He would remain an active opponent of feminism for the rest of his career.

== Personal life ==
=== Family ===
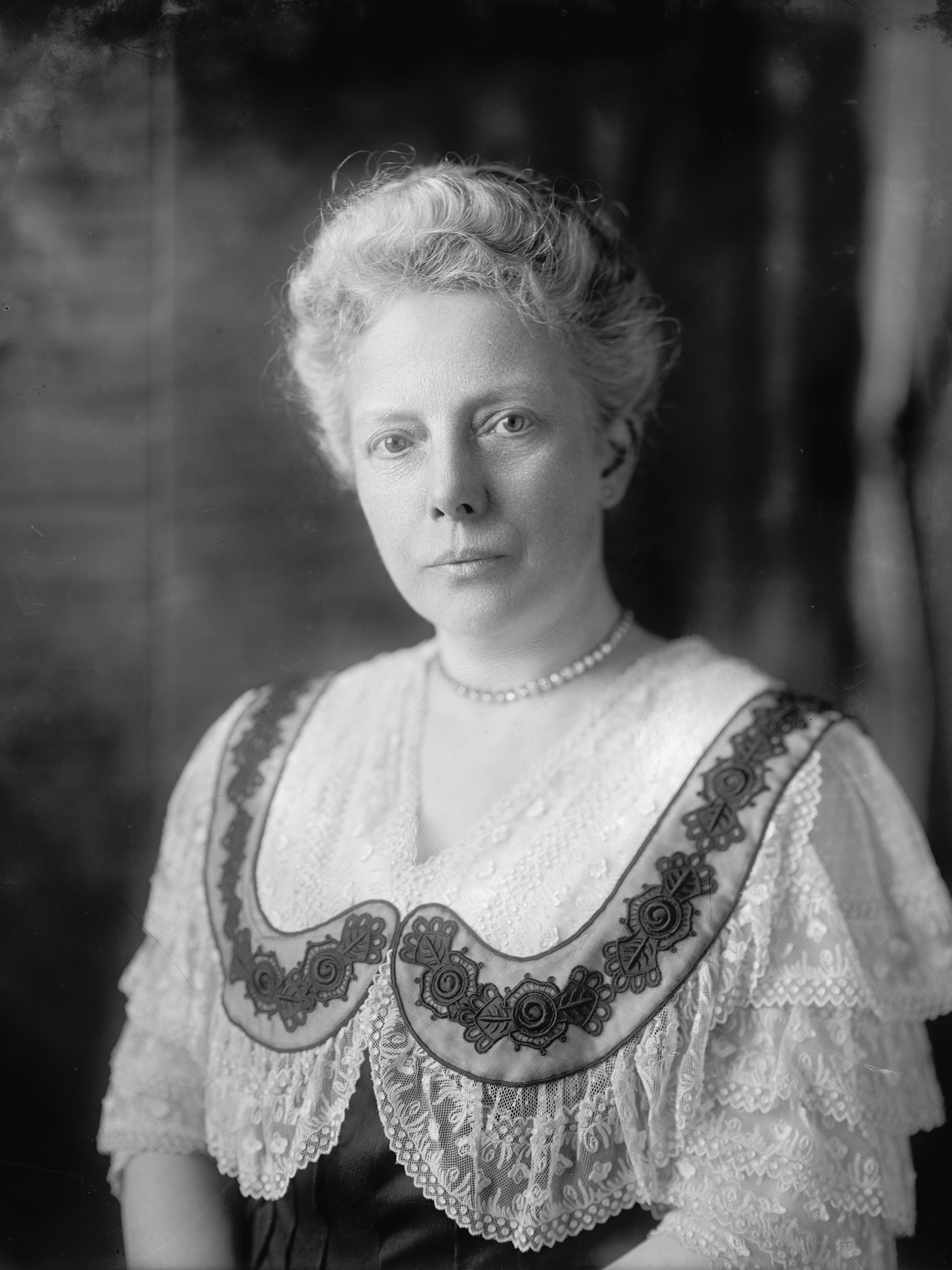
Clara Frances Root (née Wales), Elihu's wife

In 1870, Root accompanied his brother Wally, with whom he had lived in his early days in New York, on a European voyage. Wally suffered from tuberculosis (then known as incurable "consumption") and believed that the trip would cure his disease. The brothers were together in Dresden at the outbreak of the Franco-Prussian War; they followed its progress throughout the summer as Wally's condition worsened. Towards the end of the trip, Elihu had to carry his brother in his arms. They returned to Clinton, where Wally died on November 15, 1870. Elihu paid off his debts.

In 1878, Root married Clara Frances Wales, the daughter of prominent New York Republican Salem Howe Wales. They had three children:

- Edith Root (b. December 1, 1878, m. Ulysses S. Grant III)
- Elihu Root Jr. (b. May 7, 1881, m. Alida Stryker)
- Edward Wales Root (b. July 23, 1884)

Elihu Root Jr. graduated from Hamilton College and became an attorney, like his father. He married Alida Stryker, the daughter of Hamilton College president M. Woolsey Stryker.

=== Religion ===
Root was a devout Presbyterian, consistent with his upbringing. Upon first moving to New York City, he enrolled as a member of the Young Men's Christian Association, served as its vice president, contributed essays on Christian manhood to its literary society, and taught Sunday school.

=== Friendships and professional associations ===
Chief Judge of the New York Court of Appeals Willard Bartlett was Root's lifelong friend from their time as young lawyers in New York.

Root shared a love of western big game hunting with President Roosevelt.

Root was a member of the Union League Club of New York and twice served as its president, 1898–99, and again from 1915 to 1916. He also served as president of the New York City Bar Association from 1904 to 1905. He became the president of the National Security League in 1917, succeeding his mentor Joseph Hodges Choate. Root spoke in favor of war and in opposition to women's suffrage as head of the league. He was a member of the American Philosophical Society.

== Death and legacy ==
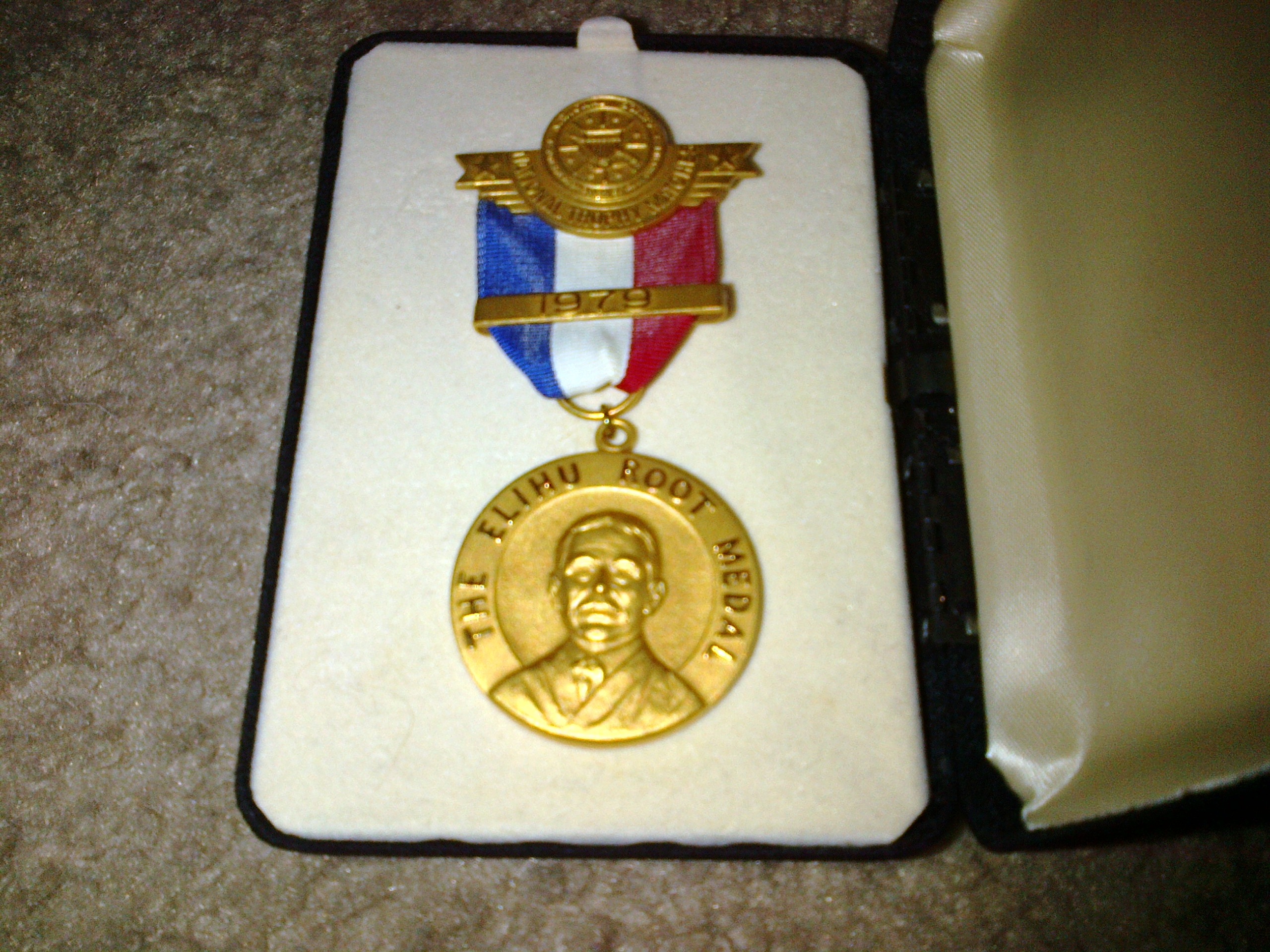
Elihu Root Gold Medal

Root died in 1937 in New York City, with his family by his side. A simple service was held in Clinton, led by Episcopal bishop E.H. Coley of the Episcopal Diocese of Central New York. Root is buried, along with his wife Clara (d. 1928), at the Hamilton College Cemetery.

Root was the last surviving member of the McKinley Cabinet and the last Cabinet member to have served in the 19th century.

=== Legacy ===
Professor Alfred McCoy argues that Root was the first "foreign policy grandmaster" in American history and that Root more than any other figure is responsible for transforming America into a world power. According to McCoy, Root devoted his time as Secretary of State and as a Senator to ensuring that the United States would have a consistent presence in world affairs, and Root helped to establish the Special Relationship between the United States and Great Britain. Root helped to ensure that powerful business interests and the intellectual elite supported an interventionist foreign policy.

In addition to receiving the Nobel Prize, Root was awarded the Grand Cross of the Order of the Crown (from Belgium) and the Grand Commander of the Order of George I (from Greece). Root joined the Empire State Society of the Sons of the American Revolution in 1895, based on his descent from Lieutenant Elihu Root (1772–1843) who was an officer in the Continental Army from Massachusetts, and was the second cousin twice removed of the publisher Henry Luce. In 1912, Root was elected as an honorary member of the New York Society of the Cincinnati.

=== Memorials ===
During World War II the Liberty ship SS Elihu Root was built in Panama City, Florida, and named in his honor.

Root's home in Clinton, which he purchased in 1893, became known as the Elihu Root House, and was declared a National Historic Landmark in 1972. The United States Army Reserve Base in New York Mills, New York, bears his name.

The Elihu Root Gold Medal is awarded to the six highest scoring civilian competitors in the National Trophy Rifle Team Match and are subsequently named as team members. The captain and coach of the highest-scoring civilian team are named as the coach and captain of the team. All eight members receive Elihu Root gold medals.

== Works by Elihu Root ==
Articles

- "A Requisite for the Success of Popular Diplomacy". Foreign Affairs, vol. 1, no. 1, September 15, 1922. (pp. 3–10)
- "Statesman and Useful Citizen" Vanity Fair, 1915
- "The Government and the Coming Hague Conference." The Advocate of Peace (1894–1920) 69, no. 5 (1907): 112–16. http://www.jstor.org/stable/25752898.
- "The Need of Popular Understanding of International Law." The American Journal of International Law 1, no. 1 (1907): 1–3. https://doi.org/10.2307/2186279.
- "The Sanction of International Law." The American Journal of International Law 2, no. 3 (1908): 451–57. https://doi.org/10.2307/2186324.
- "The Basis of Protection to Citizens Residing Abroad." Proceedings of the American Society of International Law at Its Annual Meeting (1907-1917) 4 (1910): 16–27. http://www.jstor.org/stable/25656384.
- "The Real Monroe Doctrine." The American Journal of International Law 8, no. 3 (1914): 427–42. https://doi.org/10.2307/2187489.
- "The Declaration of the Rights and Duties of Nations Adopted by the American Institute of International Law." The American Journal of International Law 10, no. 2 (1916): 211–21. https://doi.org/10.2307/2187520.
- "The Invisible Government." The Annals of the American Academy of Political and Social Science 64 (1916): viii–xi. http://www.jstor.org/stable/1013701.
- "The Outlook for International Law." The American Journal of International Law 10, no. 1 (1916): 1–11. https://doi.org/10.2307/2187357.
- "Theodore Roosevelt." The North American Review 210, no. 769 (1919): 754–58. http://www.jstor.org/stable/25120404.
- "PERMANENT COURT OF INTERNATIONAL JUSTICE." American Bar Association Journal 6, no. 7 (1920): 181–85. http://www.jstor.org/stable/25700734.
- "The Constitution of an International Court of Justice." The American Journal of International Law 15, no. 1 (1921): 1–12. https://doi.org/10.2307/2187931.
- "The Codification of International Law." The American Journal of International Law 19, no. 4 (1925): 675–84. https://doi.org/10.2307/2188306.
- Root, Elihu, and J. Ramsay MacDonald. "The Risks of Peace." Foreign Affairs 8, no. 1 (1929): i–xiii. https://doi.org/10.2307/20028758.

Books

- The Citizen's Part in Government. Yale University Press, 1911.
- Experiments in Government and the Essentials of the Constitution. Princeton University Press, 1913.
- Addresses on International Subjects. Harvard University Press, 1916.
- The Military and Colonial Policy of the United States: Addresses and Reports by Elihu Root. Harvard University Press, 1916.
- Miscellaneous Addresses. Harvard University Press, 1917.
- Men and Policies: Addresses by Elihu Root. Harvard University Press, 1925.

Published addresses

- "Theodore Roosevelt". The North American Review, November 1919. (p. 754) — A speech delivered for the Rocky Mountain Club on October 27, 1919.
- The Short Ballot and the "Invisible Government": An Address by Elihu Root. New York: The National Short Ballot Organization, 1919. — This address was delivered at the New York Constitutional Convention on August 30, 1915, in support of a resolution to reduce the number of elective state officers and combine the 152 state departments into 17. The measure was popularly known as the "Short Ballot".

== See also ==
- List of covers of Time magazine (1920s): October 18, 1926

== Bibliography ==
=== Books ===
- Hewes, James E. Jr. (1975). From Root to McNamara: Army Organization and Administration, 1900–1963.
- Jessup, Phillip C. (1938). Elihu Root. New York: Dodd, Mead & Co.
- Leopold, Richard W. (1954). Elihu Root and the Conservative Tradition. Boston: Little, Brown and Company.
- Oller, John (2019). White Shoe: How a New Breed of Wall Street Lawyers Changed Big Business and the American Century. New York: Dutton. ISBN 9781524743253. LCCN 2018029077.
- Skowronek, Stephen (1982). Building a New American State: The Expansion of National Administrative Capacities, 1877–1920. Cambridge University Press. pp. 212–47.
- Zimmermann, Warren (2004). First Great Triumph: How Five Americans Made Their Country a World Power. Macmillan. ISBN 0374528934.
- The National Cyclopædia of American Biography. (1939) Vol. XXVI. New York: James T. White & Co. pp. 1–5.

=== Articles ===
- Cantor, Louis. "Elihu Root and the National Guard: Friend or Foe?" Military Affairs 33#3 (1969), pp. 361–373 online
- Dubin, Martin David (1966). "Elihu Root and the Advocacy of a League of Nations, 1914-1917". The Western Political Quarterly. 19 (3): 439–55. doi:10.2307/444707. JSTOR 444707.
- Holmes, James R. (2007). "Theodore Roosevelt and Elihu Root: International Lawmen". World Affairs. 169 (4): 189–98. doi:10.3200/WAFS.169.4.189-200. JSTOR 20672775.
- Istre, Logan S. (2021). "Bench over Ballot: The Fight for Judicial Supremacy and the New Constitutional Politics, 1910–1916". The Journal of the Gilded Age and Progressive Era. 20 (1): 2–23. doi:10.1017/S1537781420000079. S2CID 225450487.
- Needham, Henry Beach (November 1905). "Mr. Root and the State Department". The World's Work: A History of Our Time. 6: 6835–40.
- Rice, Hattie M. (1951). "Elihu Root on the Negro". Negro History Bulletin. 14 (9): 198–99. JSTOR 44212475.
- Scott, James Brown (1928). "Elihu Root". In Bemis, Samuel Flagg (ed.). The American Secretaries of State and Their Diplomacy. Vol. IX. New York: A. A. Knopf.
- Scott, James Brown (1924). "Elihu Root's Services to International Law". Proceedings of the American Society of International Law at Its Annual Meeting. 18: 2–42. doi:10.1017/S0272503700033267. JSTOR 25656665.
- Semsch, Philip L. (1963). "Elihu Root and the General Staff". Military Affairs. pp. 16–27.
- Szajkowski, Zosa (1969). "Jews and the Elihu Root Mission to Russia. 1917". Proceedings of the American Academy for Jewish Research. 37: 57–116. doi:10.2307/3622524. JSTOR 3622524.
- Ten Eyck, Andrew (October 19, 1921). "Elihu Root: A Study Of The Man And His Ways". The Outlook. Vol. 129. pp. 429–30.
- White, Richard D. (1998). "Civilian Management of the Military: Elihu Root and the 1903 Reorganization of the Army General Staff". Journal of Management History. doi:10.1108/13552529810369614.

Political offices
Preceded by Russell A. Alger	U.S. Secretary of War; Served under: William McKinley, Theodore Roosevelt; August 1, 1899 – January 31, 1904	Succeeded by William Howard Taft
Preceded by John Hay	U.S. Secretary of State; Served under: Theodore Roosevelt; July 19, 1905 – January 27, 1909	Succeeded by Robert Bacon
U.S. Senate
Preceded by Thomas C. Platt	U.S. senator (Class 3) from New York; March 4, 1909 – March 3, 1915; Served alongside: Chauncey Depew, James O'Gorman	Succeeded by James Wolcott Wadsworth Jr.
Honorary titles
Preceded by Adelbert Ames	Oldest living U.S. senator April 12, 1933 – February 7, 1937	Succeeded by Newell Sanders
