= Walter L. Brown =

American politician

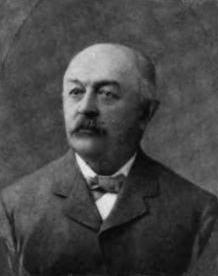
- Brown in 1903

Member of the New York Senate from the 33rd district
- In office January 1, 1896 – December 31, 1898
- Preceded by: New district
- Succeeded by: James D. Feeter
- In office January 1, 1903 – December 31, 1906
- Preceded by: James D. Feeter
- Succeeded by: Seth G. Heacock

Member of the New York Assembly
- In office January 1, 1888 – December 31, 1889
- Preceded by: Frank B. Arnold
- Succeeded by: Nathan Bridges
- Constituency: 2nd Otsego
- In office January 1, 1891 – December 31, 1893
- Preceded by: Nathan Bridges
- Succeeded by: John J. Rider
- Constituency: 2nd Otsego (1891–1892); Otsego (1893)

Personal details
- Born: September 5, 1846 Carlisle, New York
- Died: February 3, 1924 (aged 77) Montebello, California

Walter Livingstone Brown (September 5, 1846 – February 3, 1924) was an American politician from New York.

== Life ==
Born in Carlisle, Schoharie County, New York, Brown attended the common schools. In 1868, he removed to Albany where he worked in a hardware store. In 1872, he removed to Oneonta and opened there his own hardware store. He also engaged in dairy farming. He served five years as the First-Lieutenant of the Third Separate Company of the New York National Guard.

He was Supervisor of the Town of Oneonta from 1882 to 1888; and a member of the New York State Assembly in 1888, 1889, 1891, 1892 (all four Otsego Co., 2nd D.) and 1893 (Otsego Co.).

He was a member of the New York State Senate (33rd D.) from 1896 to 1898, and from 1903 to 1906; sitting in the 119th, 120th, 121st, 126th, 127th, 128th and 129th New York State Legislatures.

Brown died while wintering in Montebello, California, at the age of 77.

== Sources ==
- The New York Red Book compiled by Edgar L. Murlin (published by James B. Lyon, Albany NY, 1897; pg. 135f, 404, 506f and 509f)
- New York State Legislative Souvenir for 1893 with Portraits of the Members of Both Houses by Henry P. Phelps (pg. 26)

New York State Assembly
Preceded by Frank B. Arnold	New York State Assembly; Otsego County, 2nd District; 1888–1889	Succeeded by Nathan Bridges
Preceded by Nathan Bridges	New York State Assembly; Otsego County, 2nd District; 1891–1892	Succeeded by district abolished
Preceded by new district	New York State Assembly; Otsego County; 1893	Succeeded by John J. Rider
New York State Senate
Preceded by new district	New York State Senate; 33rd District; 1896–1898	Succeeded by James D. Feeter
Preceded by James D. Feeter	New York State Senate; 33rd District; 1903–1906	Succeeded by Seth G. Heacock
