= James W. Gerard =

American politician

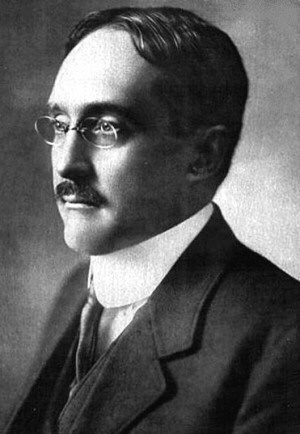
- Gerard in 1916

Treasurer of the Democratic National Committee
- In office August 11, 1924 – June 1932
- Preceded by: Wilbur W. Marsh
- Succeeded by: Frank C. Walker

7th United States Ambassador to Germany
- In office October 29, 1913 – February 5, 1917
- President: Woodrow Wilson
- Preceded by: John G. A. Leishman
- Succeeded by: Ellis Loring Dresel (Acting, 1921)

Personal details
- Born: James Watson Gerard III; August 25, 1867 Geneseo, New York, U.S.
- Died: September 6, 1951 (aged 84) Southampton, New York, U.S.
- Education: Columbia University (A.B., A.M.); New York Law School (LL.B.)

Military service
- Allegiance: United States
- Branch/service: United States Army; New York National Guard
- Years of service: 1892–1904
- Rank: Major
- Unit: 1st Brigade
- Battles/wars: Spanish–American War
- James W. Gerard's voice James W. Gerard’s “The German Peril” speech (recorded 1917)

James Watson Gerard III (August 25, 1867 – September 6, 1951) was an American lawyer, diplomat, and justice of the New York Supreme Court.

== Early life and education ==
Gerard was born in Geneseo, New York. His father, James Watson Gerard Jr., was a lawyer and Democratic Party politician in New York. and his grandfather, also James Watson Gerard, was a noted trial lawyer and civic reformer in New York. He graduated from Columbia University (A.B. 1890; A.M. 1891), where he was a member of the Philolexian Society, and from New York Law School (LL.B. 1892).

== Career ==
Gerard was chairman of the Democratic campaign committee of New York County for four years. He served in the National Guard of the State of New York for four years. He served through the Spanish–American War (1898) on the staff of General McCoskry Butt. From 1900 to 1904, he was quartermaster, with the rank of major, of the 1st Brigade of the Guard. He was elected to the New York Supreme Court in 1907, where he served as a judge until 1911.

=== U.S. Ambassador to Germany ===
Under President Woodrow Wilson, Gerard served as the American Ambassador to Germany from 1913 to 1917.

In 1914, Gerard was the Democratic (Tammany Hall) candidate for U.S. Senator from New York. He defeated the Anti-Tammany candidate, Franklin D. Roosevelt, in the Democratic primary, but lost the election to James W. Wadsworth, Jr.

At the outbreak of World War I, in 1914, Gerard assumed the care of British interests in Germany, later visited the camps in which British prisoners were confined, and did much to alleviate their condition. His responsibilities were further increased by the fact that German interests in France, Britain, and Russia were placed in the care of the American embassies in those countries, which made the American embassy in Berlin become a sort of clearing house. From first-hand knowledge, he settled the question, much disputed among the Germans themselves, as to the official attitude of the German government toward the violation of Belgian neutrality.

At the request of Gottlieb von Jagow, after the fall of Liège, Gerard served as intermediary for offering the Belgians peace and indemnity if they would grant passage of German troops through their country. On August 10, 1914, the Kaiser placed in Gerard's hands a telegram addressed personally to Wilson that declared that Belgian neutrality "had to be violated by Germany on strategical grounds." At the request of a high German official, the telegram was not made public as the Kaiser had wished but was sent privately to the President. After the sinking of the RMS Lusitania with many U.S. residents on board, on May 7, 1915, Gerard's position became more difficult.

The German government asked him to leave the country in January 1917. Diplomatic relations were broken off on February 3, and he left Germany. He was detained for a time because of rumors that the German ambassador in America was being mistreated and that German ships had been confiscated. When the rumors were disproved, he was allowed to depart. He retired from diplomatic service in July 1917.

=== Later career ===
He took up the practice of law in New York City. The George H. Doran Company of New York City published two books Gerard wrote on his experiences, My Four Years in Germany, released in 1917, and the following year, Face to Face with Kaiserism. My Four Years in Germany was filmed in 1918. Gerard was of major incidental importance in the rise of Warner Brothers movie producers as his book My Four Years in Germany was the source of the Warner's first nationally syndicated film of the same name.

Gerard once said in a speech, "The Foreign Minister of Germany once said to me 'your country does not dare do anything against Germany, because we have in your country five hundred thousand German reservists [emigrants] who will rise in arms against your government if you dare to make a move against Germany.' Well, I told him that that might be so, but that we had five hundred thousand – and one – lamp posts in this country, and that that was where the reservists would be hanging the day after they tried to rise."

Upon returning to the U.S., Gerard went back to practicing law. After an unsuccessful campaign for U.S. president in 1920, Gerard ceased active pursuit of elected office but accepted a central role in U.S. Democratic Party politics as a public speaker, fundraiser, consultant, and mass media contributor. He was the treasurer for the Democratic National Committee (1924–1932) and played a leading role in the nomination of Roosevelt for president in 1932.

In 1933, Gerard reviewed Adolf Hitler's Mein Kampf for The New York Times Book Review. His critique occupied the entire front page of the section and continued inside. "Hitler is doing much for Germany," Gerard began, citing "his unification of the Germans, his destruction of communism, his training of the young, his creation of a Spartan State animated by patriotism, his curbing of parliamentary government, so unsuited to the German character; his protection of the right of private property," which he said "are all good". But he went on to condemn Hitler's anti-Semitism. "We have all of us a right to criticize, to boycott a nation which reverts to the horrible persecutions of the Dark Ages, we have a right to form a blockade of public opinion about this misguided country," he wrote. Gerard concluded, "It is with sadness, tinged with fear for the world's future, that we read Hitler's hymn of hate against that race which has added so many names to the roll of the great in science, in medicine, in surgery, in music and the arts, in literature and all uplifting human endeavor."

Gerard's final book was an autobiography, My First Eighty-Three Years in America (1951).

== Personal life ==
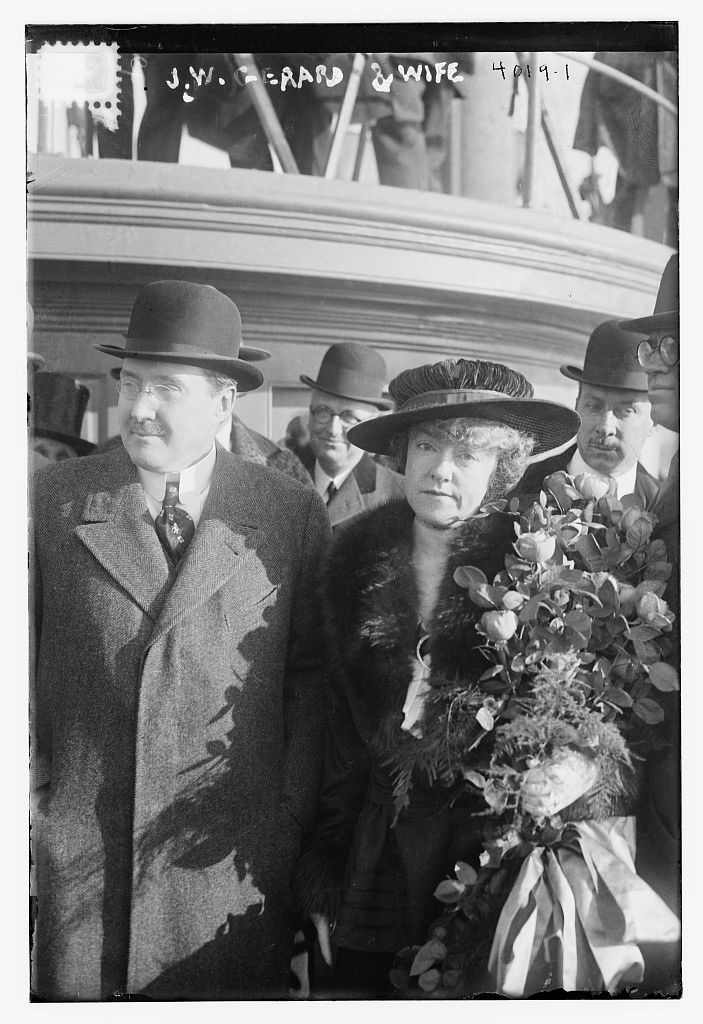
James and Mary Gerard in 1916

Gerard's wife, the former Mary Augusta Daly (called “Molly”), was the daughter of copper magnate Marcus Daly, head of the Anaconda Copper Mining Company that developed the mines of Butte, Montana, and built the town of Anaconda, Montana. They had no children. After both of Mary's parents died, she was one of the heirs to the Daly ranch, the Bitter Root Stock Farm, north of Hamilton, Montana, where the couple had frequently visited. Gerard oversaw a number of the legal interests of the Daly family, and he purchased a cattle ranch of his own in the area. Today the University of Montana holds his collected papers.

Gerard died on September 6, 1951, aged 84, in Southampton, New York. He was interred at Green-Wood Cemetery in Brooklyn, New York City.

== Notes ==
Party political offices
Preceded by n/a	Democratic nominee for U.S. senator from New York (Class 3); 1914	Succeeded by Harry C. Walker
Diplomatic posts
Preceded by John G. A. Leishman	United States Ambassador to Germany; October 29, 1913 – February 5, 1917	Succeeded by Ellis Loring Dresel
