= James W. Wadsworth Jr. =

American politician (1877–1952)

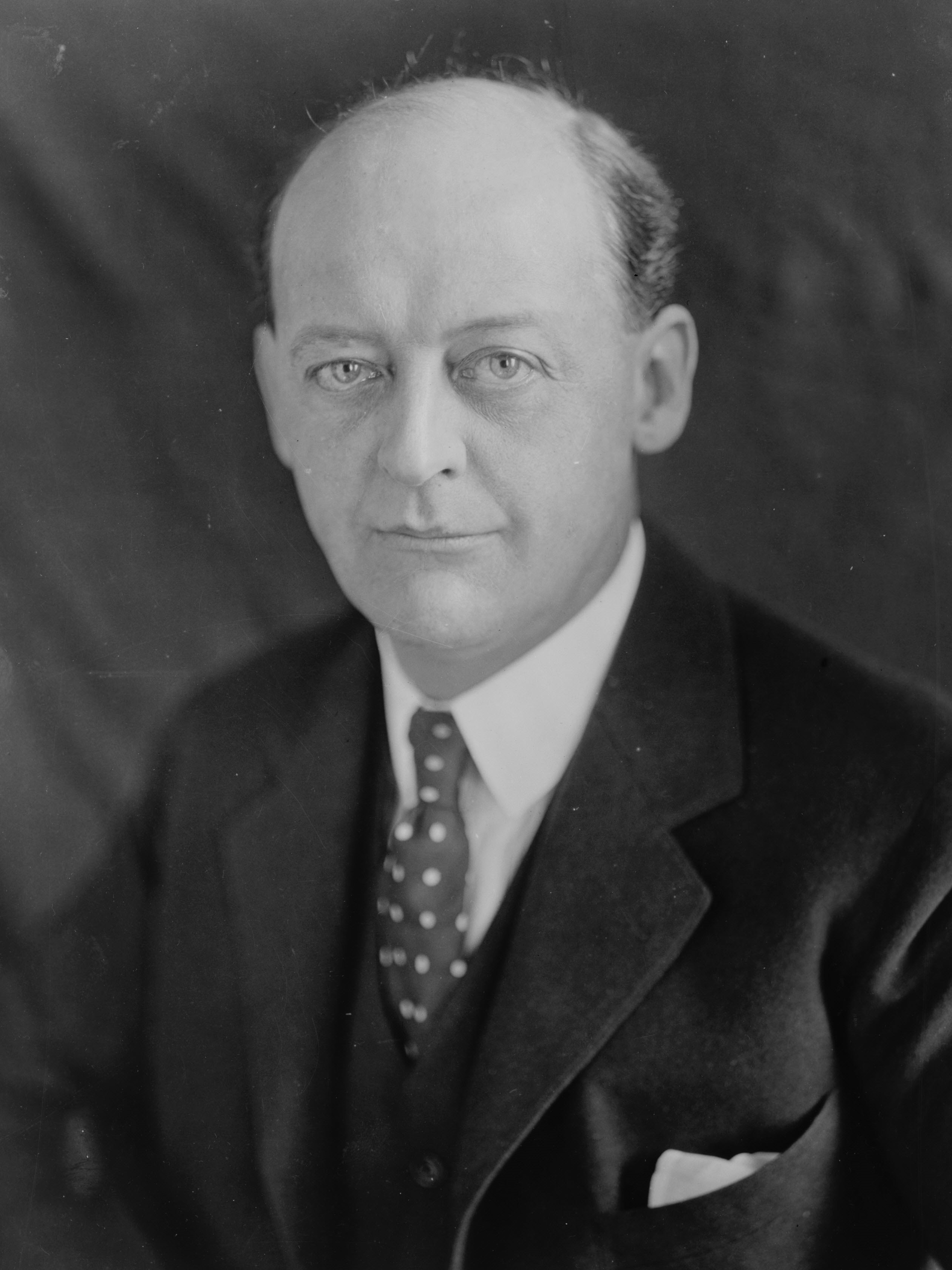

Member of the U.S. House of Representatives from New York
- In office March 4, 1933 – January 3, 1951
- Preceded by: Archie D. Sanders
- Succeeded by: Harold C. Ostertag
- Constituency: 39th district (1933–1945); 41st district (1945–1951)

Senate Minority Whip
- In office December 6, 1915 – December 13, 1915
- Leader: Jacob H. Gallinger
- Preceded by: Position established
- Succeeded by: Charles Curtis

United States Senator from New York
- In office March 4, 1915 – March 4, 1927
- Preceded by: Elihu Root
- Succeeded by: Robert F. Wagner

Speaker of the New York Assembly
- In office January 1906 – December 31, 1910
- Preceded by: S. Frederick Nixon
- Succeeded by: Daniel D. Frisbie

Member of the New York State Assembly from the Livingston County district
- In office January 1, 1905 – December 31, 1910
- Preceded by: William Robinson
- Succeeded by: John Winters

Personal details
- Born: James Wolcott Wadsworth Jr. August 12, 1877 Geneseo, New York, U.S.
- Died: June 21, 1952 (aged 74) Washington, D.C., U.S.
- Party: Republican
- Parent: James Wolcott Wadsworth (father)
- Relatives: James S. Wadsworth (grandfather); Cornelia Adair (aunt); John George Adair (uncle); John Hay (father-in-law)
- Education: Yale University (BA)

James Wolcott Wadsworth Jr. (August 12, 1877 – June 21, 1952) was an American politician, a Republican from New York. He was the son of New York State Comptroller James Wolcott Wadsworth, and the grandson of Union General James S. Wadsworth.

== Early life ==
Wadsworth was born in Geneseo, New York on August 12, 1877. He was the son of New York State Comptroller James Wolcott Wadsworth (1846–1926) and Louisa (née Travers) Wadsworth (1848–1931).

His paternal grandparents were Union General James S. Wadsworth (1807-1864) and Mary Craig (née Wharton) Wadsworth (1814–1874). His grandfather built a 13,000 square-foot house in Geneseo in 1835.

Wadsworth attended St. Mark's School, then graduated from Yale in New Haven, Connecticut in 1898, where he was a member of Skull and Bones.

== Career ==
After Yale, he served as a private in the Volunteer Army in the Puerto Rican Campaign during the Spanish–American War. Upon leaving the Army, he entered the livestock and farming business, first in New York and then Texas.

He became active early in Republican politics. He was a member of the New York State Assembly (Livingston Co.) in 1905, 1906, 1907, 1908, 1909 and 1910; and was Speaker from 1906 to 1910.

In 1912, he ran for Lieutenant Governor of New York on the Republican ticket with Job E. Hedges, but was defeated. In 1914, at the first popular election for the U.S. Senate (prior to the Seventeenth Amendment, U.S. senators had been elected by the New York State Legislature), Wadsworth defeated Democrat James W. Gerard (the incumbent United States Ambassador to Germany) and Progressive Bainbridge Colby. Wadsworth was Senate Minority Whip in 1915, as the Democrats held the majority of Senate seats. He was re-elected in 1920 but defeated by Democrat Robert F. Wagner in 1926. In 1921, Wadsworth was considered for the post of Secretary of War by President Warren G. Harding but was ultimately passed over in favor of John W. Weeks.

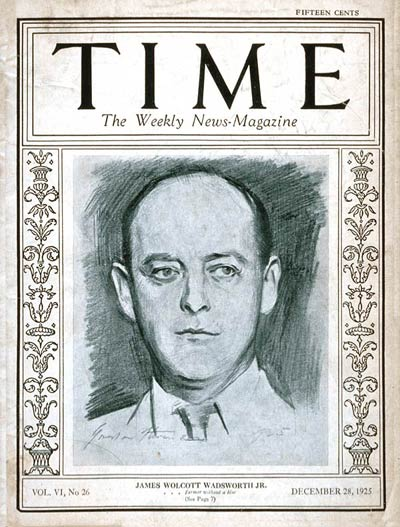
Time, December 28, 1925

Wadsworth was a proponent of individual rights and feared what he considered the threat of federal intervention into the private lives of Americans. He believed that the only purpose of the United States Constitution is to limit the powers of government and to protect the rights of citizens. For this reason, he voted against the Eighteenth Amendment when it was before the Senate. Before Prohibition went into effect, Wadsworth predicted that there would be widespread violations and contempt for the law.

By the mid-1920s, Wadsworth was one of a handful of congressmen who spoke out forcefully and frequently against prohibition. He was especially concerned that citizens could be prosecuted by both state and federal officials for a single violation of prohibition law. This seemed to him to constitute double jeopardy, inconsistent with the spirit if not the letter of the Fifth Amendment.

In 1926, he joined the Association Against the Prohibition Amendment and made 131 speeches across the country for the organization between then and repeal. His political acumen and contacts proved valuable in overturning prohibition.

He served in the U.S. House of Representatives from 1933 to 1951, and, like Alton Lennon, Garrett Withers, Claude Pepper, Hugh Mitchell, Matthew M. Neely, and Magnus Johnson, is one of the few modern senators to serve later in the House of Representatives. In the House, he opposed the isolationism of many of his conservative Republican colleagues, opposed anti-lynching legislation on states' rights grounds, rejected minimum wage laws and most of FDR's domestic policy. Although Wadsworth never ran for president, his name was mentioned as a possible candidate in 1936 and 1944.

Winifred C. Stanley, a representative from Buffalo, New York, was kept off the U.S. House Committee on the Judiciary by Wadsworth, who was in charge of assignments. Stanley made clear that she wanted to maintain in "peacetime the drive and energy which women have contributed to the war." Thus in 1944, Stanley had introduced a bill for the National Labor Relations Board to bar discrimination in pay on the basis of sex. The bill died in committee. Wadsworth's reason was his opposition to women in the workplace, according to a House of Representatives history of women in Congress.

A confidential 1943 analysis of the House Foreign Affairs Committee by Isaiah Berlin for the British Foreign Office described Wadsworth as

A newcomer to the committee; in the House since 1933. A highly respected and well-liked Congressman, who has voted in support of nearly all the President's foreign policy measures. One of the most forceful and independent-minded men in Congress and a highly skilled parliamentarian. While not favoring any "World New Deal", he is apparently in favor of American co-operation with the rest of the world and United States definite commitments to establish a secure peace but disagrees with any attempt by the United States to interfere with other nations' internal politics or forms of government. A very effective supporter of the Administration's foreign policies, who did yeoman service by his speeches and active lobbying during the recent Lend-Lease debate. Was in the Senate from 1915 to 1927. A wealthy Episcopalian squire, sympathetic to Moral Re-Armament. Age 66. An internationalist.

He was a hereditary companion of the Military Order of the Loyal Legion of the United States and was also a member of the United Spanish War Veterans.

== Personal life ==
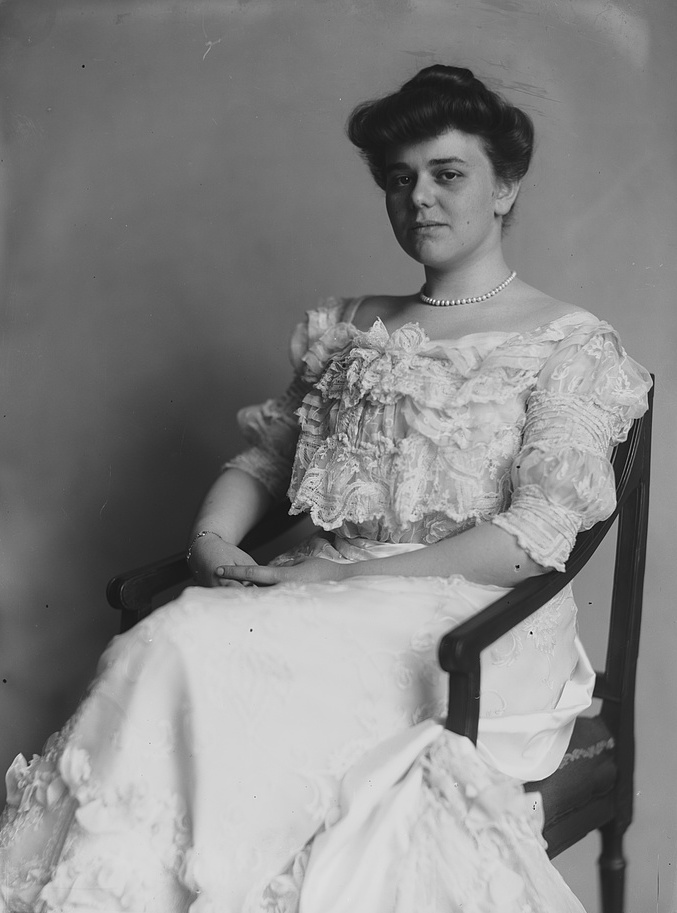
Photograph of Miss Alice Hay, taken between 1890 and 1920 by Frances Benjamin Johnston. Hay, Wadsworth's wife, served as president of NAOWS

Wadsworth was married to Alice Evelyn Hay (1880–1960). She was the daughter of John Hay, former United States Secretary of State under President Theodore Roosevelt. Through her sister Helen Hay Whitney, she was the aunt of John Hay Whitney, United States Ambassador to the United Kingdom. Alice, who opposed women's suffrage, served as president of the National Association Opposed to Woman Suffrage, which Wadsworth also opposed. Together, they were the parents of:

- Evelyn Wadsworth (1903–1972), who married Stuart Symington (1901–1988) in 1924. Symington was the first United States Secretary of the Air Force and a Democratic U.S. Senator from Missouri, who unsuccessfully sought the Democratic presidential nomination in 1960.
- James Jeremiah Wadsworth (1905–1984), who served as United States Ambassador to the United Nations in 1960-61.
- Reverdy J. Wadsworth (1914–1970), who married Eleanor Katherine Roosevelt (1915–1995), the daughter of Henry L. Roosevelt, Assistant Secretary of the Navy under his distant cousin, President Franklin D. Roosevelt.

Wadsworth died on June 21, 1952, in Washington, D.C. He was buried in Temple Hill Cemetery in Geneseo.

=== Descendants ===
Through his daughter Evelyn, he was the grandfather of James W. Symington (b. 1927), who served in the United States House of Representatives from Missouri as a Democrat, from 1969 to 1977.

Through his son James, he was the grandfather of Alice Wadsworth (1928–1998) who was married to Trowbridge Strong (1925–2001) in 1948 at the home of Wadsworth's grandfather, General James Wadsworth.

== See also ==
- List of people on the cover of Time Magazine: 1920s. December 28, 1925.

== Sources ==
- United States Congress. "James W. Wadsworth Jr. (id: W000012)". Biographical Directory of the United States Congress.

Political offices
Preceded by S. Frederick Nixon	Speaker of the New York Assembly; 1906–1910	Succeeded by Daniel D. Frisbie
Party political offices
Preceded by Edward Schoeneck	Republican nominee for Lieutenant Governor of New York; 1912	Succeeded by Edward Schoeneck
First	Republican nominee for U.S. Senator from New York (Class 3); 1914, 1920, 1926	Succeeded by George Z. Medalie
New office	Senate Republican Whip; 1915	Succeeded by Charles Curtis
Preceded by William Kenyon	Secretary of the Senate Republican Conference; 1915–1927	Succeeded by Frederick Hale
U.S. Senate
Preceded by Elihu Root	U.S. Senator (Class 3) from New York; 1915–1927; Served alongside: James Aloysius O'Gorman, William M. Calder, Royal S. Copeland	Succeeded by Robert F. Wagner
New office	Senate Minority Whip; 1915	Succeeded by Charles Curtis
Preceded by George Earle Chamberlain	Chair of the Senate Military Affairs Committee; 1919–1927	Succeeded by David A. Reed
U.S. House of Representatives
Preceded by Archie D. Sanders	Member of the U.S. House of Representatives from New York's 39th congressional district 1933–1945	Succeeded by W. Sterling Cole
Preceded by Joseph Mruk	Member of the U.S. House of Representatives from New York's 41st congressional district 1945–1951	Succeeded by Harold C. Ostertag
