= DeCicco =

DeCicco is a surname. Notable people with the surname include:

- Dom DeCicco (born 1988), American football player
- Frank DeCicco (1935–1986), American mobster
- George DeCicco (1929–2014), American mobster
- Mike DeCicco (1927–2013), American fencing coach

== See also ==
- Anne Marie DeCicco-Best (born 1964), Canadian mayor
- De Cicco v. Schweizer, a United States contract law case
- DeCicco's, a family-owned chain of supermarkets in the northern suburbs of New York City
