= People v. Molineux =

1901 case tried by the New York Court of Appeals

- Court: New York Court of Appeals
- Full case name: The People of the State of New York, Respondent, v. Roland B. Molineux, Appellant
- Argued: June 17, 1901
- Decided: October 15, 1901
- Citation: 168 N.Y. 264

Holding
- Judgment of conviction reversed and new trial ordered.

Court membership
- Chief judge: Alton B. Parker
- Associate judges: John Clinton Gray, Denis O'Brien, Edward T. Bartlett, Albert Haight, Irving G. Vann, William E. Werner

Case opinions
- Majority: Werner, joined by Bartlett, Vann
- Concur/dissent: Parker, joined by Gray, Haight

People v. Molineux, 168 N.Y. 264 (1901), was a landmark decision by the Court of Appeals of New York concerning the trial of a suspected murderer.

== Background, trial and appellate decision ==
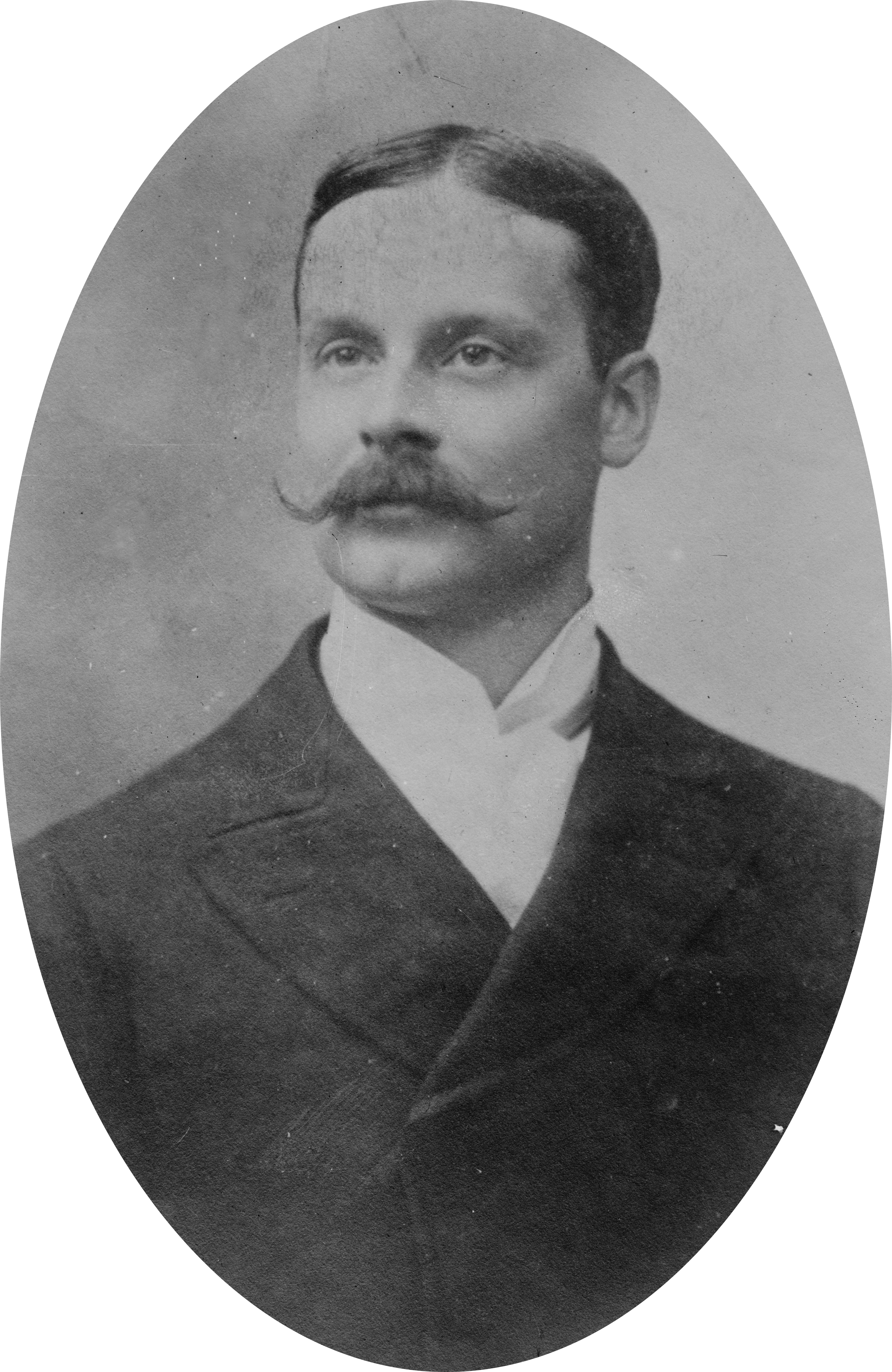
Roland Burnham Molineux

Roland Burnham Molineux, son of General Edward L. Molineux of Brooklyn, was a chemist by profession. He was charged with first degree murder for having caused the death of Katherine Adams by poisoning. It was alleged that Molineux had a feud with Harry Seymour Cornish, the athletic director of the Knickerbocker Athletic Club, and that Molineux had mailed a bottle labeled "Emerson's Bromo-Seltzer" to Cornish at the club. The powder in the bottle contained cyanide of mercury. Cornish took the bottle home to the lodgings he shared with his 62-year-old distant cousin, Katherine Adams, and her daughter, Florence. On the morning of December 28, 1898, Katherine was suffering from a headache, and Florence, recalling that Cornish had brought the bottle of bromo-seltzer home the previous evening, asked Cornish for it. At Katherine's request, Cornish removed the cork from the bottle and prepared a dose by mixing a heaping teaspoonful of the bromo-seltzer with a half glass of water. Katherine drank the contents of the glass and, within a few minutes, became violently ill. A doctor was called, but Katherine died shortly after his arrival.

Molineux's first jury trial lasted from November 1899 to February 1900, making the People v. Molineux the longest and one of the most expensive trials in New York history to that date. The press offered wall-to-wall coverage, especially the New York World and the New York Journal, then locked in the epic circulation struggle that began yellow journalism.

Molineux was convicted on February 10, 1900. After being sentenced to death on February 16, he was transferred to Sing Sing to await execution. His lawyers filed an appeal, and on October 15, 1901, the Court of Appeals of New York reversed the conviction. The decision was a

judicial landmark, defining the conditions under which prosecutors could introduce evidence of previous crimes at a defendant's trial. Generally speaking, wrote Justice William E. Werner in a formulation that even today is known as the "Molineux rule," the state "cannot prove against a defendant any crime not alleged in the indictment." This rule was intended as a constitutional safeguard, protecting a defendant from "the assumption that [he] was guilty of the crime charged because he had committed other, similar crimes in the past."

At the original trial, the prosecution had entered evidence suggesting that Molineux had been responsible for an earlier death, that of Henry Crossman Barnet, with the aim of showing that he had a propensity to murder. Molineux and Barnet were friends. In November 1897, Molineux had introduced Barnet to Blanche Chesebrough, and shortly after that, Blanche turned down Molineux's proposal of marriage. It was alleged that a rivalry which developed between Molineux and Barnet over Blanche was Molineux's motive for bringing about Barnet's death. Barnet died on November 10, 1898, and on November 19, 1898, one week after attending Barnet's funeral, Blanche married Molineux. Barnet's death had been attributed by the attending physicians to a weakened heart caused by diphtheria, despite the fact that he had become violently ill on October 28, 1898, after having taken a dose from a sample tin of Kutnow's Improved Effervescent Powder which had arrived in the mail, unsolicited, two months earlier. The powder was later analyzed, and found to contain cyanide of mercury. On February 28, 1899, Barnet's body was exhumed and the organs, when analyzed, were found to contain the same poison; however, Molineux had never been indicted for the murder of Barnet, and the Appeals Court ruled that using "evidence" of an unproven previous act of murder against the defendant in a subsequent unrelated trial violated the basic tenet of presumption of innocence, and, therefore, such evidence was inadmissible (other than on five clearly defined grounds). (Note: In order to prove Motive, Intent, Modus operandi, for Identification, or to demonstrate a Common scheme or plan.) Thus, "the state cannot prove against a defendant any crime not alleged in the indictment, either as a foundation for a separate punishment, or as aiding the proofs that he is guilty of the crime charged."

The decision was notable in its impact on the rules of admissibility of evidence. Over one hundred years later, Judge Rosenblatt of the New York Appeals Court stated that the Molineux decision was a "landmark case" which led to the precedent that:

a criminal case should be tried on the facts and not on the basis of a defendant's propensity to commit the crime charged. It is axiomatic that propensity evidence invites a jury to misfocus, if not base its verdict, on a defendant's prior crimes rather than on the evidence (or lack of evidence) relating to the case before it. We have repeated this theme throughout the last century

== Aftermath ==
Molineux was acquitted at his subsequent retrial. On November 18, 1902, one week after Molineux's acquittal, Blanche filed for divorce in Sioux Falls, South Dakota, citing mental cruelty. The divorce was granted in September 1903, and less than two months later Blanche married Wallace D. Scott, her attorney in the divorce proceedings. She died in 1954 at the age of eighty.

By 1912 Molineux had written a play set in a prison, The Man Inside, which was produced by David Belasco in 1913. On November 8, 1913, three days before the play's premiere, Molineux married Margaret Connell. During 1913 Molineux's mental condition had deteriorated, and in November of that year he was said to have had a nervous breakdown, and was in a sanitarium. Molineux died November 2, 1917 in Kings Park State Hospital. According to the death certificate, he had died of "syphilitic infection".

The prosecuting New York District Attorney Asa Bird Gardiner was sacked by then-Governor Theodore Roosevelt on the grounds of incompetence.

One of Molineux's lawyers was former governor Frank S. Black. Another, Bartow Sumter Weeks, went on to become a New York Court of Appeals judge.

== See also ==
- Molineux hearing
