= 1913 New York state election =

1913 New York state elections
- November 4, 1913

The 1913 New York state election was held on November 4, 1913, to elect the Chief Judge and an associate judge of the New York Court of Appeals, as well as all members of the New York State Assembly.

== Background ==
In 1913, there were only two state officer to be elected statewide: the Chief Judge, to succeed Edgar M. Cullen, and an associate judge of the Court of Appeals, to succeed John Clinton Gray who both had reached the constitutional age limit of 70 years.

== Nominations ==
The Republican state convention met on September 23 at Carnegie Hall in New York City. U.S. Senator Elihu Root was Permanent chairman. They nominated Associate Judge (elected in 1904) William E. Werner for Chief Judge (vote: Werner 447, Edgar Truman Brackett 151); and Associate Judge (designated in 1906) Frank H. Hiscock for associate judge (vote: Hiscock 444, Frederick E. Crane 157).

The Progressive state convention met on September 27 at Rochester, New York. They nominated federal judge Learned Hand for Chief Judge, and Justice Samuel Seabury for associate judge. Hand was chosen over Werner because of the latter's decision in Ives v. Southern Buffalo Railway Co. (N.Y. 1911) striking down the state's first workers' compensation statute as unconstitutional.

The Democratic State Committee met on October 4 at the Knickerbocker Hotel in New York City. George M. Palmer was chairman. They nominated two Democrats, Associate Judge (elected in 1907) Willard Bartlett, and Abram I. Elkus, although Alton B. Parker, Chairman of the Committee on Non-partisan Candidates of the State and county bar associations, had recommended to endorse the Republican nominees (vote: Bartlett 38, Werner 3; Elkus 37, Hiscock 4).

The Independence League State Committee met at Arlington Hall, in St. Mark's Place in New York City, after the Democratic and Republican nominations had been made, and endorsed Democrat Bartlett and Republican Hiscock.

== Result ==
The cross-endorsed Independence League ticket, made up of the Democratic Chief Judge and the Republican associate judge, was elected.

Both Bartlett and Hiscock continued on the Court, Bartlett becoming Chief Judge, and Hiscock moving from an additional to a regular seat.

1913 state election result
Office	Democratic ticket		Republican ticket		Independence League ticket	Progressive ticket		Socialist ticket		Prohibition ticket	
Chief Judge	Willard Bartlett	600,375	William E. Werner	597,357	Willard Bartlett	Learned Hand	195,097	Henry L. Slobodin	61,586	Charles E. Manierre	17,279
Judge of the Court of Appeals	Abram I. Elkus	564,831	Frank H. Hiscock	635,998	Frank H. Hiscock	Samuel Seabury	193,798	Hezekiah D. Wilcox	60,969	Coleridge A. Hart	17,297

Note: "Blank, void and scattering" votes: 49,138 (for Chief Judge)

== See also ==
- New York state elections

== Sources ==
- Result in State of New York Delegates and Alternates to the Republican National Convention, Chicago, June 7, 1916 (printed for the Republican Party [N.Y.], Tenny Press, 1916)

Vote totals from New York Red Book 1914
