= De Cicco v. Schweizer =

Contract law case

- Court: New York Court of Appeals
- Full case name: Attilio De Cicco v. Joseph Schweizer et al.
- Argued: October 15, 1917
- Decided: November 13, 1917
- Citation: 117 N.E. 807, 221 N.Y. 431, L.R.A. 1918E 1004, Ann. Cas. 1918C 816

Case history
- Procedural history: Judgment for plaintiff (Sup. Ct.), affirmed as modified, De Cicco v. Schweizer, 152 N.Y.S. 1106 (App. Div. 1915) (memorandum opinion)
- Related actions: Order denying defendant's motion (Sup. Ct.), reversed, De Cicco v. Schweizer, 163 N.Y.S. 823 (App. Div. 1917)

Court membership
- Chief judge: Frank H. Hiscock
- Associate judges: Andrews, Cardozo, Collin, Crane, Cuddeback, Pound

Case opinions
- Majority: Cardozo, joined by Hiscock, Cuddeback, Pound, Andrews
- Concurrence: Crane
- Collin took no part in the consideration or decision of the case.

De Cicco v. Schweizer, (Note: Some sources render the litigants' names as "DeCicco", "Di Cicco" or "Schweitzer". This article uses the rendering from the case reporters except where it is rendered differently in source titles and quotations.) 117 N.E. 807 (N.Y. 1917), is a notable contract law case concerning privity of contract and consideration. The case examined whether there was consideration in a contract where person A makes a promise to person B, and in exchange person B promises to perform a previous contract obligation to person C. Additionally, the case looked at the general class of prenuptial agreements.

== Factual background ==
On January 20, 1902, Count Oberto Gulinelli (Note: Count Gulinelli's full name was Oberto Giacomo Giovanni Francesco Maria Gulinelli. Some sources state his name as "Gianoberto Gulinelli" or "Alberto Gulinelli", or spell his surname "Gullinelli".) of Italy married Blanche Schweizer, of Lincoln Square, Manhattan. Joseph and Ernestine Teresa Schweizer, Blanche's parents, had signed documents providing a substantial dowry to the betrothed. The Schweizers were to pay $2,500 every January 20 for the rest of their lives, and leave half their estate—estimated at well over $1M in 1912—to the pair. For ten years, the Schweizers paid on time, but payments ceased in 1912. Gulinelli assigned the $2,500 payment to one Attilio De Cicco, who brought suit in New York to recover the payment.

According to testimony at trial, the Gulinellis may have sought to separate in 1911. Blanche came to New York, where she asked for and received money from her father, which he later argued was an advance on the 1912 allowance.

== Procedural background ==
The plaintiff filed suit in the summer of 1913, naming both Joseph and Ernestine Schweizer as defendants, and requesting damages in the amount of $2500. Trial was held in the Supreme Court in Manhattan in January 1914, under Justice Erlanger. Judgment was rendered for the plaintiff in the amount of $99.70. Both parties submitted motions for a new trial, which were denied. Both parties then appealed.

The Appellate Division rendered judgment on January 22, 1915. Presiding was Justice Ingraham, with Justices McLaughlin, Scott, Dowling and Laughlin present. Ruling unanimously, the court modified the award of the trial court, awarding the plaintiff $2,500, with interest and costs for a total of $3,030.77. Joseph Schweizer appealed from this judgment.

== Judgment ==
The court unanimously affirmed the Appellate Division. In a majority opinion by Judge Cardozo, the court held that there was a sufficient consideration for the promise; that although the promise was to the husband it was intended for the benefit of the daughter, and when it came to her knowledge she had a right to adopt and enforce it, and in doing so she made herself a party to the contract.
