= Benjamin N. Cardozo =

US Supreme Court justice from 1932 to 1938

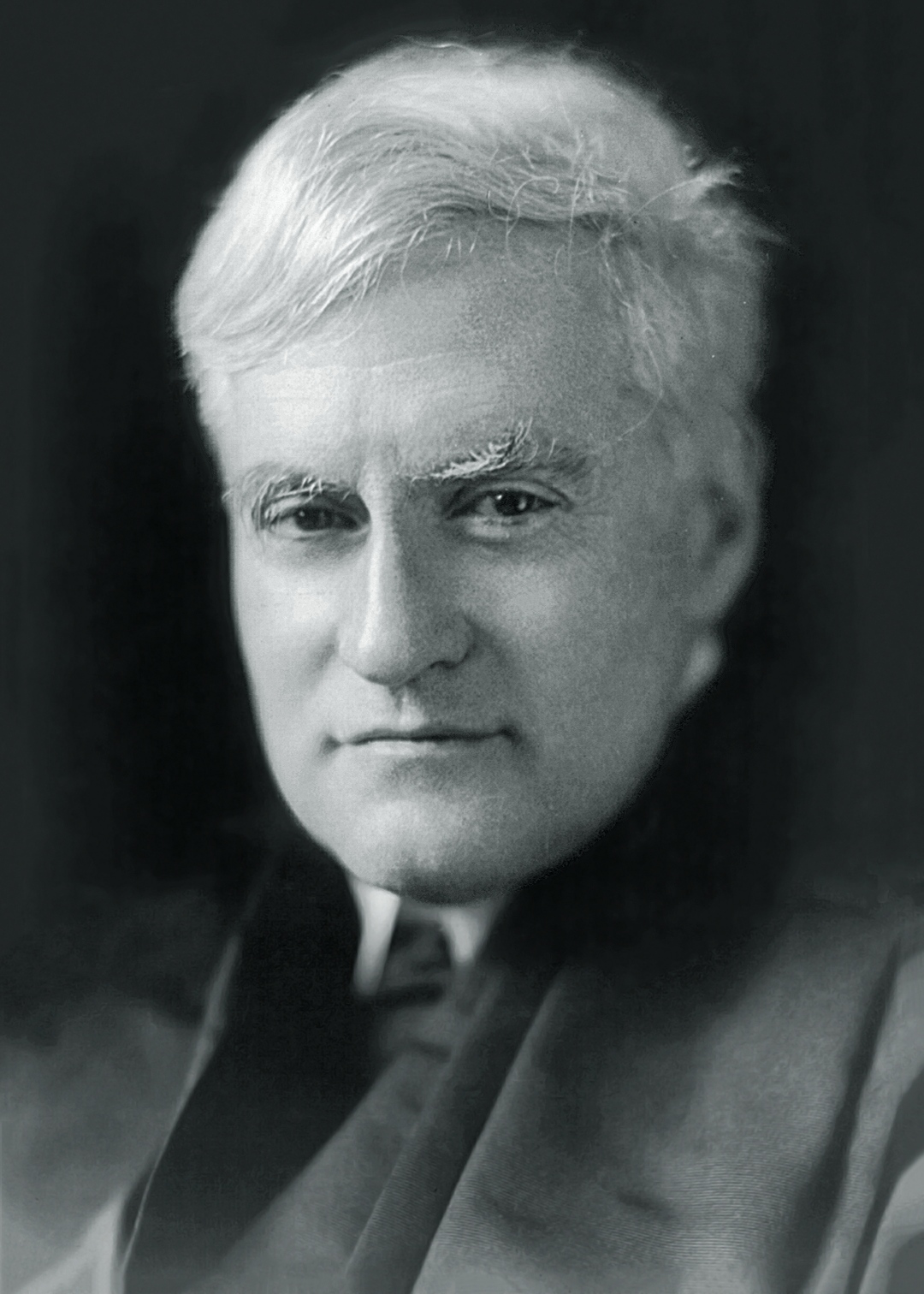
- Cardozo c. 1932

Associate Justice of the Supreme Court of the United States
- In office March 14, 1932 – July 9, 1938
- Nominated by: Herbert Hoover
- Preceded by: Oliver Wendell Holmes Jr.
- Succeeded by: Felix Frankfurter

Chief Judge of the New York Court of Appeals
- In office January 1, 1927 – March 7, 1932
- Preceded by: Frank Hiscock
- Succeeded by: Cuthbert Pound

Associate Judge of the New York Court of Appeals
- In office January 15, 1917 – December 31, 1926
- Preceded by: Samuel Seabury
- Succeeded by: John F. O'Brien

Justice of the Supreme Court of New York for the First Judicial Division
- In office January 5, 1914 – January 15, 1917 (Sitting by designation in the Court of Appeals from February 2, 1914)
- Preceded by: Bartow S. Weeks
- Succeeded by: Samuel H. Ordway

Personal details
- Born: Benjamin Nathan Cardozo; May 24, 1870 New York City, U.S.
- Died: July 9, 1938 (aged 68) Port Chester, New York, U.S.
- Party: Democratic
- Parent: Albert Cardozo (father)
- Education: Columbia University (AB, MA)

Benjamin Nathan Cardozo (May 24, 1870 – July 9, 1938) was an American lawyer and jurist who served on the New York Court of Appeals from 1914 to 1932 and as an associate justice of the Supreme Court of the United States from 1932 until his death in 1938. Cardozo is remembered for his significant influence on the development of American common law in the 20th century, as well as for his philosophy and vivid prose style.

Born in New York City, Cardozo passed the bar in 1891 after attending Columbia Law School. He won an election to the New York Supreme Court in 1913 but was appointed to the New York Court of Appeals the following year. He won election as chief judge of that court in 1926. As chief judge, he wrote majority opinions in cases such as Palsgraf v. Long Island Railroad Co.

In 1932, President Herbert Hoover appointed Cardozo to the U.S. Supreme Court to succeed Oliver Wendell Holmes Jr. Cardozo served on the Court until his death in 1938 and formed part of the liberal bloc of justices known as the Three Musketeers. He wrote the Court's majority opinion in notable cases such as Nixon v. Condon (1932) and Steward Machine Co. v. Davis (1937).

== Early life and family ==
Cardozo, the son of Rebecca Washington (née Nathan) and Albert Jacob Cardozo, was born in 1870 in New York City. Both Cardozo's maternal grandparents, Sara Seixas and Isaac Mendes Seixas Nathan, and his paternal grandparents, Ellen Hart and Michael H. Cardozo, were Western Sephardim of the Portuguese-Jewish community, and affiliated with Manhattan's Congregation Shearith Israel. Cardozo had his bar mitzvah at Shearith Israel in June of 1883. Their ancestors had immigrated to the British colonies from London, England, before the American Revolution.

The family were descended from Jewish-origin New Christian conversos. They left the Iberian Peninsula for Holland during the Inquisition. There they returned to the practice of Judaism. Cardozo family tradition held that their marrano (New Christians who maintained crypto-Jewish practices in secrecy) ancestors were from Portugal, although Cardozo's ancestry has not been firmly traced to that country. But "Cardozo" (archaic spelling of Cardoso), "Seixas", and "Mendes" are the Portuguese, rather than Castilian, spelling of those common Iberian surnames.

Benjamin Cardozo had a fraternal twin, his sister Emily. They had four other siblings, including an older sister Nell and older brother.

Benjamin was named for his uncle, Benjamin Nathan, a vice president of the New York Stock Exchange, who was murdered in 1870. The case was never solved. Among their many cousins, given their deep history in the US, was the poet Emma Lazarus. Other earlier relations include Francis Lewis Cardozo (1836–1903), Thomas Cardozo, and Henry Cardozo, free men of color of Charleston, South Carolina. Francis became a Presbyterian minister in New Haven, Connecticut, after education in Scotland, and was elected Secretary of State of South Carolina during the Reconstruction era. Later he worked as an educator in Washington, D.C., under a Republican administration.

Albert Cardozo, Benjamin Cardozo's father, was a judge on the Supreme Court of New York (the state's general trial court) until 1868. He was implicated in a judicial corruption scandal sparked by the Erie Railway takeover wars and was forced to resign. The scandal also led to the creation of the Association of the Bar of the City of New York. After leaving the court, the senior Cardozo practiced law for nearly two decades more until his death in 1885.

When Benjamin and Emily were young, their mother Rebecca died. The twins were raised during much of their childhood largely by their sister Nell, who was 11 years older. Benjamin remained devoted to her throughout his life.

=== Education ===
One of Benjamin's tutors was Horatio Alger. When the Cardozos engaged Alger in 1883 to tutor Benjamin and his older sister Elizabeth, they were unaware that Alger had a history of likely molesting teen boys during his time as a minister in Brewster, Massachusetts, from 1864 to 1866. There is no evidence that Alger continued committing these crimes after the ones he was alleged of during his ministry, from which he was expelled in 1866 following an inquiry in which he failed to deny the boys' description of events. In reviewing Cardozo's life, Chief Judge Judith S. Kaye stated Alger provided Cardozo with a superb education, and a love of poetry.

At age 15, Cardozo entered Columbia University, where he was elected to Phi Beta Kappa and was a member of the Philolexian Society, earning his BA in 1889 and his MA in 1890. He was admitted to Columbia Law School in 1889. Cardozo wanted to enter a profession that could enable him to support himself and his siblings, but he also hoped to restore the family name, which had been sullied by his father's actions as a judge. Cardozo left law school after two years without a law degree, as only two years of law school was required to sit for the bar during this era in New York.

== Legal career ==
=== Law practice ===
Cardozo passed the bar examination in 1891 and began practicing appellate law alongside his older brother. Benjamin Cardozo practiced law in New York City until year-end 1913 with Simpson, Warren and Cardozo.

Interested in advancement and restoring the family name, Cardozo ran for a judgeship on the New York Supreme Court. In November 1913, Cardozo was elected by a large margin to a 14-year term on that court and took office on January 1, 1914.

=== New York Court of Appeals ===
In February 1914, Cardozo was designated to the New York Court of Appeals under the Amendment of 1899. He was reportedly the first Jewish person to serve on the Court of Appeals.

In January 1917, he was appointed by the governor to a regular seat on the Court of Appeals to fill the vacancy caused by the resignation of Samuel Seabury. In November 1917, he was elected on the Democratic and Republican tickets to a 14-year term on the Court of Appeals.

In 1926, he was elected, on both tickets again, to a 14-year term as Chief Judge. He took office on January 1, 1927, and resigned on March 7, 1932 to accept his appointment to the United States Supreme Court.

His tenure was marked by a number of original rulings, in tort and contract law in particular. This is partly due to timing; rapid industrialization was forcing courts to look anew at old common law components to adapt to new settings.

In 1921, Cardozo gave the Storrs Lectures at Yale University, which were later published as The Nature of the Judicial Process, a book that remains valuable to judges today. Shortly thereafter, Cardozo became a member of the group that founded the American Law Institute, which crafted a Restatement of the Law of Torts, Contracts, and a host of other private law subjects. He wrote three other books that also became standards in the legal world.

While on the Court of Appeals, he criticized the exclusionary rule as developed by the federal courts, saying: "The criminal is to go free because the constable has blundered". He noted that many states had rejected the rule, but suggested that the adoption by the federal courts would affect the practice in the sovereign states.

=== United States Supreme Court ===
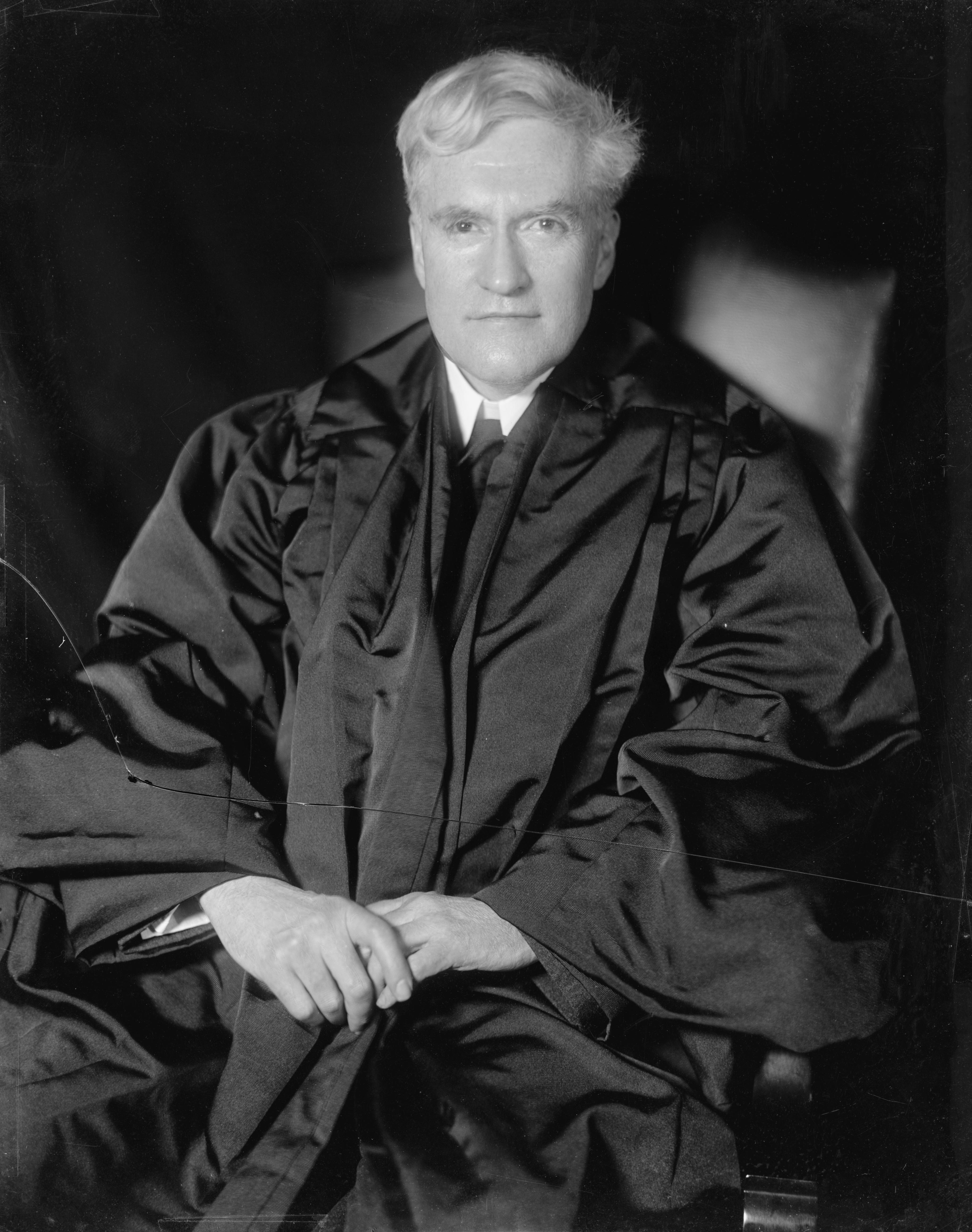
Justice Cardozo in his judicial robes

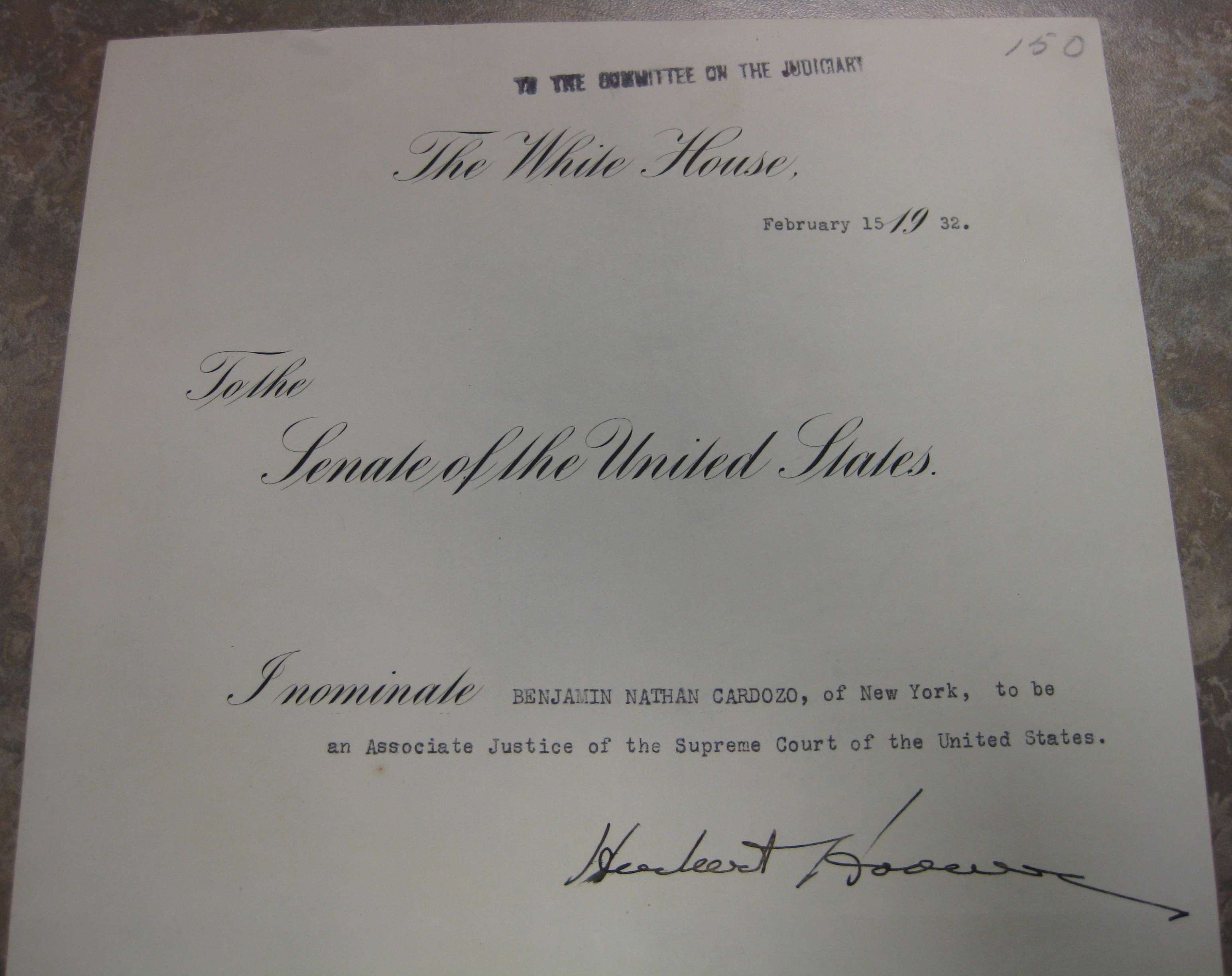
Cardozo's Supreme Court nomination

On February 15, 1932, President Herbert Hoover nominated Cardozo as an associate justice of the United States Supreme Court, to succeed Oliver Wendell Holmes. The New York Times said of Cardozo's appointment that "seldom, if ever, in the history of the Court has an appointment been so universally commended." The Democrat Cardozo's appointment by a Republican president has been referred to as one of the few Supreme Court appointments in history that was not motivated by partisanship or politics, but strictly based on the nominee's contribution to law.

He was confirmed by the U.S. Senate on February 24, 1932, and was sworn into office on March 14. During a radio broadcast soon after Cardozo's confirmation, Clarence C. Dill, a Democratic senator from Washington, called Hoover's appointment of Cardozo "the finest act of his career as President." The entire faculty of the University of Chicago Law School had urged Hoover to nominate Cardozo, as did the deans of the law schools at Harvard, Yale, and Columbia. Justice Harlan Fiske Stone strongly urged Hoover to name Cardozo, even offering to resign to make room for him if Hoover had his heart set on someone else (Stone had suggested to Calvin Coolidge that he should nominate Cardozo in 1925 before Stone). Hoover originally demurred; he was concerned that there were already two justices from New York, and a Jew on the court. Justice James McReynolds was a notorious anti-Semite (and once on the Court, McReynolds directed antagonistic antisemitic behavior toward Cardozo, something he had been sheltered from in his prior life). When the chairman of the Senate Foreign Relations Committee, William E. Borah of Idaho, added his strong support for Cardozo, however, Hoover finally bowed to the pressure.

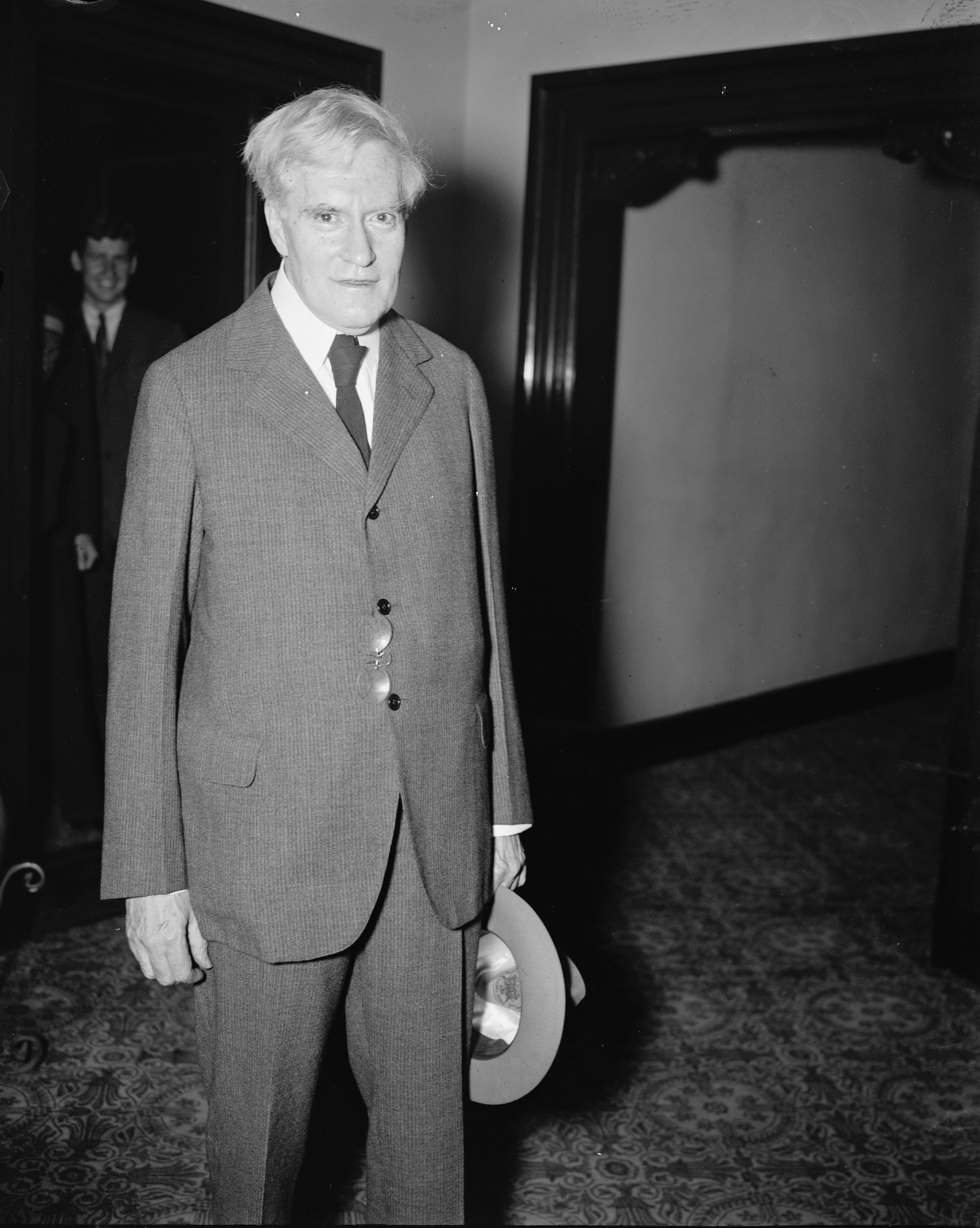
Cardozo on his 67th birthday (1937)

Cardozo was a member of the Three Musketeers, along with Brandeis and Stone, who were considered to be the liberal faction of the Supreme Court. During his tenure in the Court, Cardozo wrote opinions that stressed the necessity of tight adherence to the Tenth Amendment.

=== Honors ===
Cardozo received the honorary degree of LL.D. from several colleges and universities, including: Columbia (1915); Yale (1921); New York (1922); Michigan (1923); Harvard (1927); St. John's (1928); St. Lawrence (1932); Williams (1932); Princeton (1932); Pennsylvania (1932); Brown (1933); and Chicago (1933).

== Personal life ==
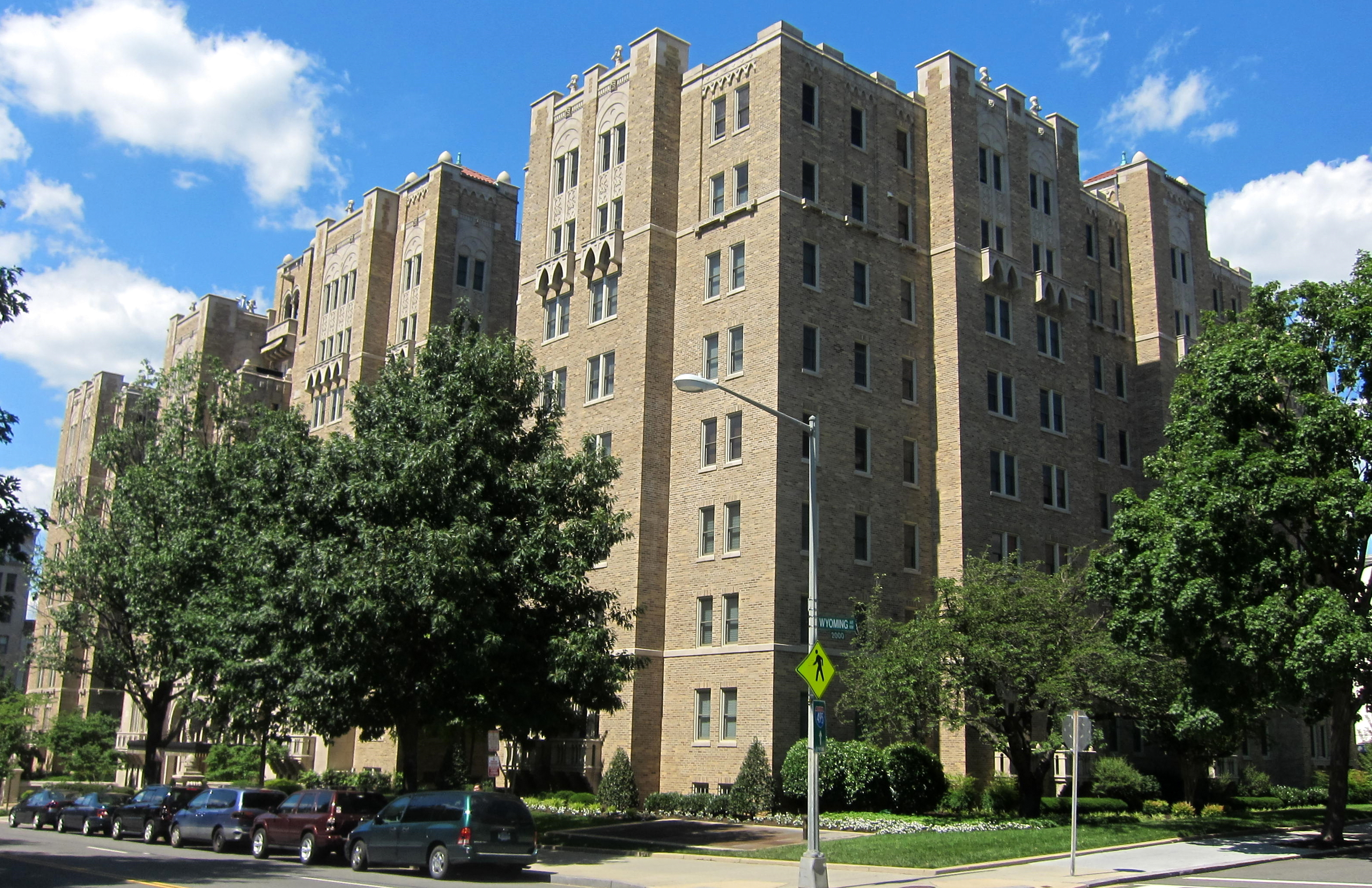
Cardozo had an apartment in this building in Washington, D.C.

As an adult, Cardozo no longer practiced Judaism (he identified as an agnostic), but he was proud of his Jewish heritage.

Of the six children born to Albert and Rebecca Cardozo, only his twin sister Emily married. She and her husband did not have any children.

Constitutional law scholar Jeffrey Rosen noted in a New York Times book review of Richard Polenberg's book on Cardozo:

Polenberg describes Cardozo's lifelong devotion to his older sister Nell, with whom he lived in New York until her death in 1929. When asked why he had never married, Cardozo replied, quietly and sadly, "I never could give Nellie the second place in my life".

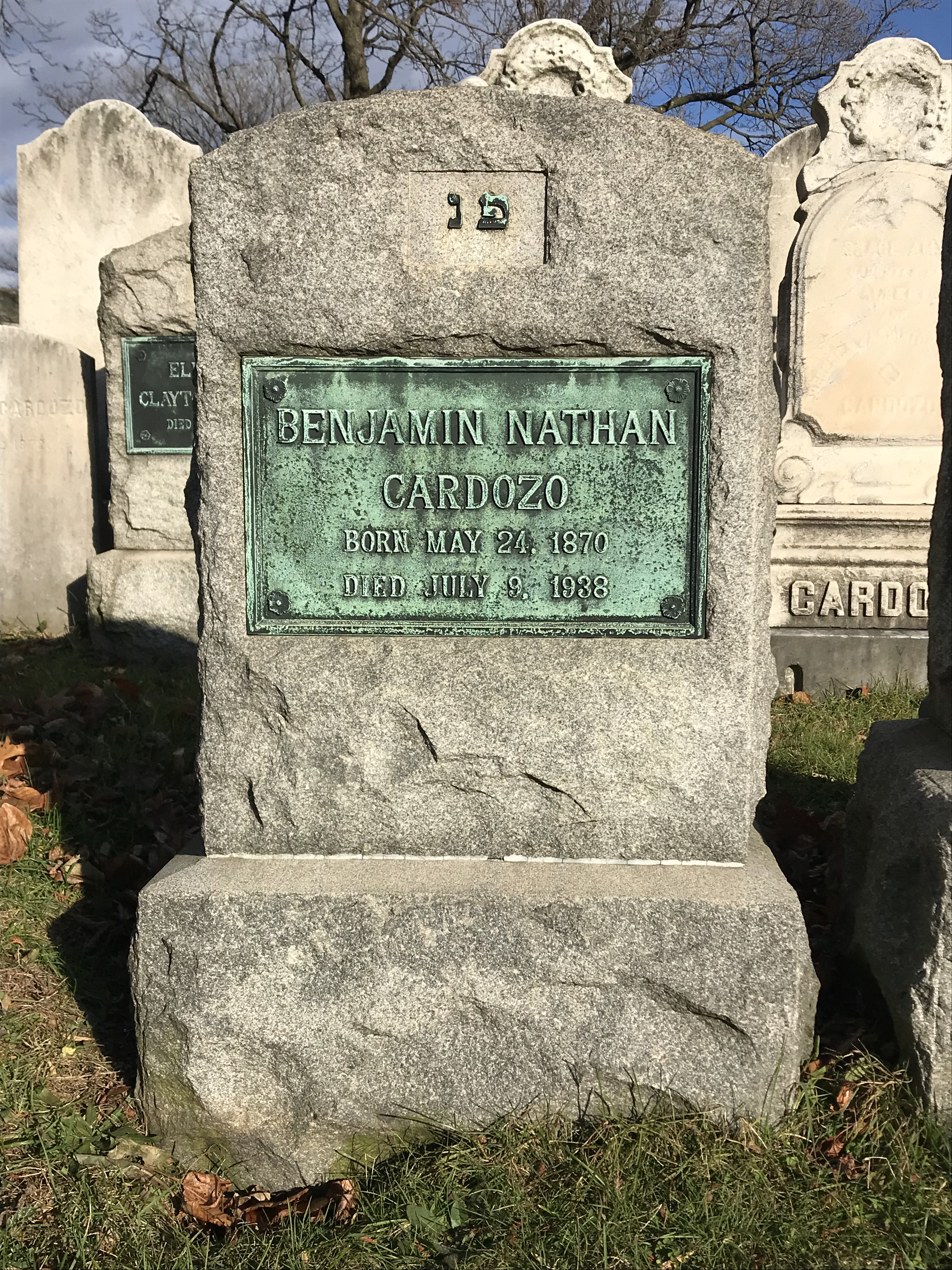
Cardozo's gravesite

In late 1937, Cardozo had a heart attack, and in early 1938, he suffered a stroke. He died on July 9, 1938, at the age of 68. He was buried in Beth Olam Cemetery in Queens.

In 1939, renowned Judge Learned Hand eulogized Cardozo, describing him as able to "weigh the conflicting factors of his problem without always finding himself on one scale or the other" and noting that "his gentle nature had in it no acquisitiveness" and that he was able to get outside himself and "from this self-effacement came a power greater than the power of him who ruleth a city." Hand stated that Cardozo "was wise because his spirt was uncontaminated, because he knew no violence, or hatred, or envy, or jealousy, or ill-will." Hand found "it was this purity that chiefly made [Cardozo] the judge we so much revere; more than his learning, his acuteness, and his fabulous industry." He asked that people grasp the rare good fortune that a person with Cardozo's qualities existed, pause to "take count of our own coarser selves," and take in the lesson Cardozo taught through example, "a lesson quite at variance with most that we practice, and much that we profess."

Cardozo's evaluation of himself showed the same flair as his legal opinions:

In truth, I am nothing but a plodding mediocrity—please observe, a plodding mediocrity—for a mere mediocrity does not go very far, but a plodding one gets quite a distance. There is joy in that success, and a distinction can come from courage, fidelity and industry.

=== Ethnicity ===
Cardozo was the second Jewish justice to be appointed to the Supreme Court. The first was Louis Brandeis, whose family was Ashkenazi.

Cardozo was born into the Spanish and Portuguese Jewish community, which had traditions distinct from the Ashkenazi. Since the appointment of Justice Sonia Sotomayor in the 21st century, some commentators have suggested that Cardozo should be considered the "first Hispanic justice".

In response to this controversy, Cardozo biographer Andrew Kaufman questioned the usage of the term "Hispanic" in Justice Cardozo's lifetime: "Well, I think he regarded himself as a Sephardic Jew whose ancestors came from the Iberian Peninsula". Cardozo "confessed in 1937 that" after centuries in British North America, "his family preserved neither the Spanish language nor Iberian cultural traditions". His ancestors had lived in England, the British colonies, and the United States since the 17th century.

Some Latino advocacy groups, such as the National Association of Latino Elected Officials and the Hispanic National Bar Association, consider Sonia Sotomayor to be the first Hispanic justice, as in their view she was raised in Hispanic culture.

== Cases ==
New York Courts

- Schloendorff v. Society of New York Hospital, 105 N.E. 92 (1914) it is necessary to get informed consent from a patient before operation, but a non-profit hospital was not vicariously liable (the latter aspect was reversed in 1957)
- MacPherson v. Buick Motor Co., 111 N.E. 1050 (1916) ending privity as a prerequisite to duty in product liability by ruling that manufacturers of products could be held liable for injuries to consumers even if they were not in privity.
- De Cicco v. Schweizer, 117 N.E. 807 (1917) where Cardozo approached the issue of third party beneficiary law in a contract for marriage case. This case was fictionalized by Arthur Train in one of his ‘Mr. Tutt’ short stories, ‘Good Fellowship To All’. At the end of the story, when Cardozo’s ruling in DeCicco is cited to solve the legal problem in the story, the judge in the case follows the precedent in the ruling, but dryly remarks ‘… with all due respect to a great judge, I am privately of the opinion that he used considerable ingenuity in reaching his conclusion.’
- Wood v. Lucy, Lady Duff-Gordon, 118 N.E. 214 (1917) on an implied promise to do something constituting consideration in a contract.
- Martin v. Herzog, 126 N.E. 814 (1920) breach of statutory duty establishes negligence, and the elements of the claim includes proof of causation
- Jacob & Youngs v. Kent, 230 N.Y. 239 (1921), substantial performance of a contract does not lead to a right to terminate, only damages.
- Hynes v. New York Central Railroad Company, 131 N.E. 898 (1921), a railway owed a duty of care despite the victims being trespassers.
- Glanzer v Shepard, 233 N.Y. 236, 135 N.E. 275, 23 A.L.R. 1425 (1922), a Caballero bean weighing dispute, with duties imposed by law but growing out of contract
- Berkey v. Third Avenue Railway, 244 N.Y. 84 (1926), the corporate veil cannot be pierced, even in favor of a tort victim unless domination of a subsidiary by the parent is complete.
- Wagner v. International Railway, 232 N.Y. 176 (1926) the rescue doctrine. "Danger invites rescue. The cry of distress is the summons to relief [...] The emergency begets the man. The wrongdoer may not have foreseen the coming of a deliverer. He is accountable as if he had".
- Meinhard v. Salmon, 164 N.E. 545 (1928) the fiduciary duty of business partners is, "Not honesty alone, but the punctilio of an honor the most sensitive".
- Palsgraf v. Long Island Railroad Co., 162 N.E. 99 (1928) the development of the concept of the proximate cause in tort law.
- Jessie Schubert v. August Schubert Wagon Company, 164 N.E. 42 (1929) Respondeat superior and spousal immunity relationship are not related.
- Murphy v. Steeplechase Amusement Park, 166 N.E. 173 (1929) denied a right to recover for knee injury from riding "The Flopper" funride since the victim "assumed the risk".
- Ultramares v. Touche, 174 N.E. 441 (1931) on the limitation of liability of auditors

US Supreme Court

- Nixon v. Condon, 286 U.S. 73 (1932) all white Texas Democratic Party primary unconstitutional
- Welch v. Helvering, 290 U.S. 111 (1933) which concerns Internal Revenue Code Section 162 and the meaning of "ordinary" business deductions.
- Panama Refining Co. v. Ryan, 293 U.S. 388 (1935) dissenting from a narrow interpretation of the Commerce Clause.
- A.L.A. Schechter Poultry Corp. v. United States, 295 U.S. 495 (1935), concurring in the invalidation of poultry regulations as outside the Commerce Clause power.
- Carter v. Carter Coal Company, 298 U.S. 238 (1936) dissenting over the scope of the Commerce Clause.
- Steward Machine Company v. Davis, 301 U.S. 548 (1937) unemployment compensation and social security were constitutional
- Helvering v. Davis, 301 U.S. 619 (1937) social security not a contributory programme
- Palko v. Connecticut, 302 U.S. 319 (1937) the Due Process Clause incorporated those rights which were "implicit in the concept of ordered liberty".

== Schools, organizations, buildings and ships named after Cardozo ==
- Benjamin N. Cardozo School of Law at Yeshiva University in New York City
- Benjamin N. Cardozo Chapter of Phi Alpha Delta Law Fraternity at The Catholic University of America Columbus School of Law in Washington, D.C.
- Cardozo College, a dormitory building at Stony Brook University in Stony Brook, New York
- Benjamin N. Cardozo Lodge #163, Knights of Pythias
- Benjamin N. Cardozo High School in the borough of Queens in New York City
- Cardozo Playground in the Arverne neighborhood of Queens, New York.
- The Cardozo Hotel, 1300 Ocean Drive, Miami, Florida
- The Liberty ship SS Benjamin N. Cardozo was built by California Shipbuilding Corporation and launched on April 5, 1943 and later renamed USS Serpens.
- The Cardozo Jewish Legal Society is an affinity group at Albany Law School and other law schools dedicated to representing the interests of the school's Jewish students.

== Bibliography ==
- Cardozo, Benjamin N. (1921), The Nature of the Judicial Process, The Storrs Lectures Delivered at Yale University.
- Cardozo, Benjamin N. (1924), The Growth of the Law, 5 Additional Lectures Delivered at Yale University.
- Cardozo, Benjamin N. (1928). The Paradoxes of Legal Science. Columbia University. OCLC 843833.
- Cardozo, Benjamin N. (1931), Law and Literature and Other Essays and Addresses.
- Cardozo, Benjamin N. (1889), The Altruist in Politics, commencement oration at Columbia College, Gutenberg Project version.

== See also ==
- Demographics of the Supreme Court of the United States
- List of justices of the Supreme Court of the United States
- List of law clerks for the second seat of the Supreme Court of the United States
- List of United States Supreme Court justices by time in office
- United States Supreme Court cases during the Hughes Court
- List of first minority male lawyers and judges in New York

== Notes ==
Legal offices
Preceded by Frank Hiscock	Chief Judge of the New York Court of Appeals; 1927–1932	Succeeded by Cuthbert Pound
Preceded by Oliver Holmes	Associate Justice of the Supreme Court of the United States; 1932–1938	Succeeded by Felix Frankfurter
