= 1917 New York state election =

- November 6, 1917

The 1917 New York State election was held on November 6, 1917, to elect the Attorney General and two judges of the New York Court of Appeals, as well as all members of the New York State Assembly.

== History ==
In 1917, there were only three officers to be elected statewide:

- the Attorney General, to fill the vacancy caused by the resignation of Egburt E. Woodbury. On April 25, 1917, First Deputy Attorney General Merton E. Lewis was elected by the New York State Legislature to fill the unexpired term until the end of the year.
- a judge of the Court of Appeals, to fill the vacancy caused by the resignation of Samuel Seabury who had run for Governor of New York in 1916. Democrat Benjamin N. Cardozo was appointed to fill the vacancy temporarily.
- a judge of the Court of Appeals, to fill the vacancy caused by the election of Frank H. Hiscock as Chief Judge. Republican Chester B. McLaughlin had been appointed to fill the vacancy temporarily.

The primaries were held on September 19. All nominees were unopposed.

== Result ==
The whole Republican ticket was elected.

The incumbents Lewis, Cardozo and McLaughlin were elected to succeed themselves.

1917 state election results
Office	Republican ticket		Democratic ticket		Socialist ticket		Prohibition ticket	
Attorney General	Merton E. Lewis	696,969	Devoe P. Hodson	541,335	S. John Block	169,364	William H. Burr	26,066
Judge of the Court of Appeals	Chester B. McLaughlin	1,067,104	Chester B. McLaughlin		Louis B. Boudin	165,556	Walter T. Bliss	32,367
Judge of the Court of Appeals	Benjamin N. Cardozo	967,425	Benjamin N. Cardozo		Hezekiah D. Wilcox	172,361	Coleridge A. Hart	29,782

== See also ==
- New York state elections

== Sources ==
- Candidates in primaries: CANDIDATES IN FIELD FOR CITY OFFICES in NYT on September 9, 1917
- Result for Attorney General in The Public (Vol. 21; 1918; pg. 25)

Court of Appeals totals from New York Red Book 1918
