= Edward L. Molineux =

U.S. businessman and military officer (1833–1915)

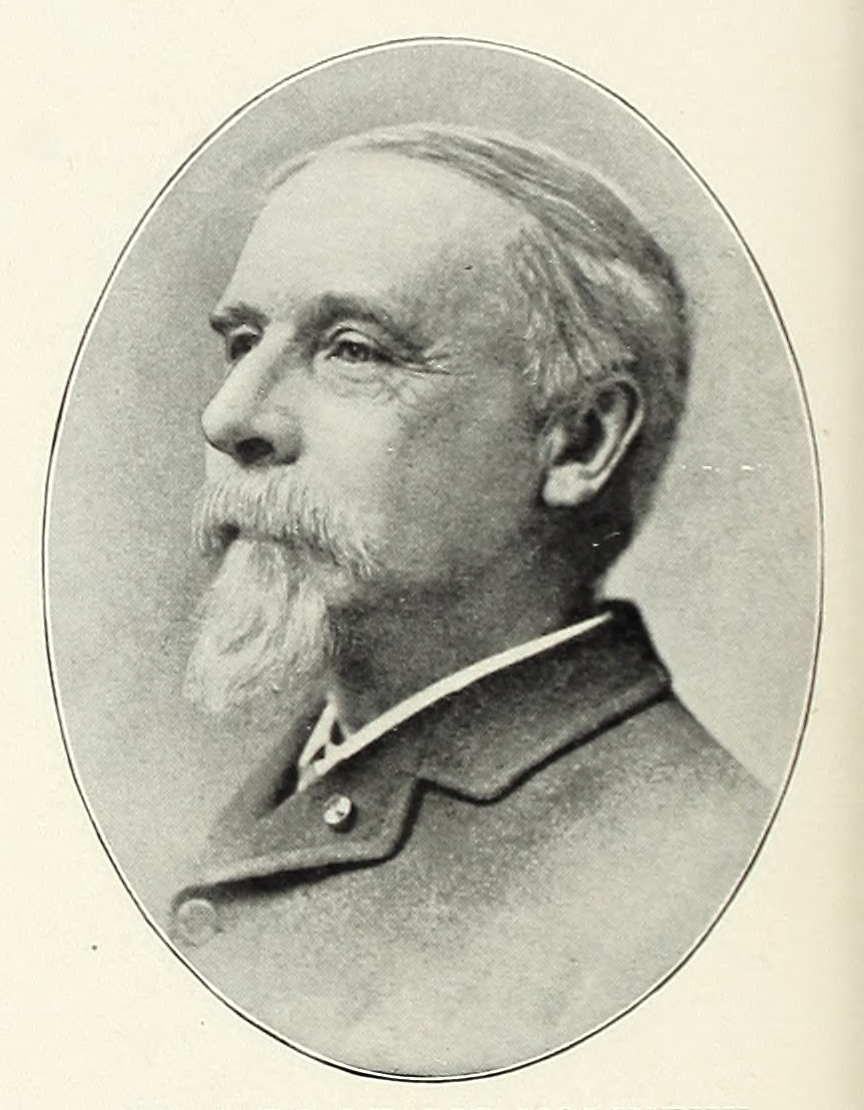
- Molineux in 1899
- Born: October 12, 1833; London, England
- Died: June 10, 1915 (aged 81) Manhattan, New York, US
- Buried: Saint James the Less Episcopal Church Cemetery, Scarsdale, New York, US
- Allegiance: Union (American Civil War); United States; New York
- Service years: 1854–1861 (Militia); 1861–1865 (Union Army); 1865–1887 (National Guard)
- Rank: Major General
- Commands: 159th New York Infantry Regiment; 2nd Brigade, 2nd Division, XIX Corps; Lafourche Military District; Provisional Division, XIX Corps; Coastal Defenses of Savannah; Military District of Northern Georgia; 11th Brigade, New York National Guard; 2nd Division, New York National Guard
- Wars: American Civil War
- Spouse: Harriet Davis Clark (m. 1861–1914)
- Children: 3
- Other work: Paint manufacturing

Edward L. Molineux (October 12, 1833 – June 10, 1915) was an American business executive and military officer from New York City. A veteran of the American Civil War, he served in the New York Militia in the 1850s, and in the United States Volunteers during the war. After the war, he continued to serve in the state militia (later the National Guard), and he attained the rank of major general as commander of New York's 2nd Division.

A native of London, Molineux was raised and educated in New York City, attended the Mechanics' Society School, and was trained as a paint maker. In 1854, he began his military career by enlisting in the state militia's 13th Regiment. At the start of the American Civil War, he transferred to the 7th New York Militia Regiment. After receiving his commission as inspector of the 11th Brigade with the rank of major, he played a key role in raising the brigade's 23rd Regiment, which resulted in his election as the regiment's lieutenant colonel and second-in-command. In August 1862, he took part in raising and equipping the 159th New York Infantry Regiment; appointed as the regimental lieutenant colonel, he was advanced to colonel and commander after the unit's first commander resigned.

During his wartime service, Molineux took part in engagements in the southern United States, including the Siege of Port Hudson and Red River campaign. Subsequent assignments included command of 2nd Brigade, 2nd Division, XIX Corps, and the Lafourche Military District. He was later assigned to Virginia, where he took part in the Valley campaigns of 1864, including the Battle of Cedar Creek. He later served as commander of the Military District of Northern Georgia. At the end of the war, he received brevet promotion to major general as a commendation of the superior service he displayed during the war.

After the Civil War, Molineux resumed his career in the paint manufacturing business, and he eventually became the manager of the Devoe & Raynolds Company's Brooklyn factory, in addition to acquiring an ownership interest in the company and serving on its board of directors. He also continued his membership in the militia, which was later retitled the National Guard. Molineux eventually commanded the 11th Brigade as a brigadier general, and the 2nd Division as a major general. In the late 1890s and early 1900s, Molineux devoted most of his time, effort, and fortune to the defense of his son Roland, who was accused of murder in the well-known People v. Molineux case. Molineux died in Manhattan on June 10, 1915, and was buried at Saint James the Less Episcopal Church Cemetery in Scarsdale.

== Early life ==
Edward Leslie Molineux was born in London on October 12, 1833, a son of William Molineux and Maria (Leslie) Molineux. The Molineux family immigrated to the United States when Molineux was two, and they settled in Manhattan. He was raised and educated in Manhattan and attended the Mechanics' Society School. He subsequently received training as a paint maker and worked for paint and varnish manufacturers including Daniel F. Tiemann.

In June 1854, Molineux began his military career when he joined the Brooklyn City Guard, which became part of the New York Militia as its 13th Regiment. Beginning as a private in Company G, he remained with this unit until April 1861, the start of the American Civil War. He then transferred to the 7th Regiment, in which he continued to serve as a private. In June 1861, he was appointed as inspector of the militia's 11th Brigade with the rank of major, and he served in this post until February 1862. Molineux was the main recruiter of the brigade's 23rd Regiment, for which its members elected him lieutenant colonel and second-in-command.

=== Family ===
In July 1861, Molineux married Harriet Davis Clark of East Hartford, Connecticut. They were married until her 1914 death, and were the parents of sons Leslie, Roland, and Cecil.

== Continued career ==
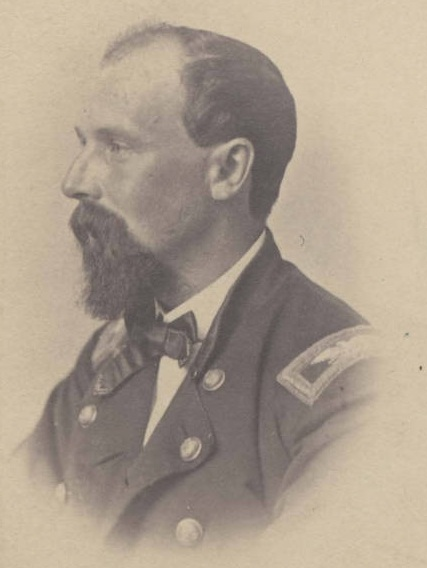
Molineux as commander of the 159th New York Infantry

In August 1862, Molineux assisted in raising the 159th New York Infantry Regiment. He was initially assigned as lieutenant colonel and second in command; when the unit's first commander, Homer Augustus Nelson, resigned, Molineux was promoted to colonel and assigned as regimental commander. The 159th New York served under Nathaniel P. Banks, commander of the Department of the Gulf, and Molineux took part in battles including the Siege of Port Hudson, Red River campaign, and Battle of Irish Bend. He also acted as commander of 2nd Brigade, 2nd Division, XIX Corps, and was wounded in the jaw at Irish Bend in April 1863. While convalescing, he took part in the Union response to the New York City draft riots. After recovering from his wounds, he returned to duty as assistant inspector general of the Department of the Mississippi. He subsequently served as the department's provost marshal and commissioner for prisoner exchanges.

Molineux was next appointed to command Louisiana's Lafourche Military District, where his duties included organizing pro-Union state troops and guarding the construction site during the building of Bailey's Dam near Alexandria, Louisiana in April and May 1864. He was later ordered to Virginia, where he took part in the Siege of Petersburg and organized a provisional division of the XIX Corps. Molineux took part in the Valley campaigns of 1864, and he earned brevet promotion to brigadier general for his superior performance of duty at the September 1864 Battle of Fisher's Hill and Third Battle of Winchester, and the October 1864 Battle of Cedar Creek. He was then assigned to Georgia, where he participated in Sherman's March to the Sea during November and December 1864.

In early 1865, he was assigned to command the Military District of Northern Georgia, including the coastal defenses of Savannah, Fort Pulaski and Tybee Island. While in this position, Molineux directed the March 1865 rescue of S.S. Lawrence, a cargo ship that had become grounded. Military members and civilian volunteers succeeded at saving the ship and its cargo of cotton, and New York City underwriters presented Molineux with a silver service as a token of their appreciation. Molineux also seized Confederate stores and infrastructure in Savannah, including gold bullion and cotton worth over $10 million ($210 million in 2025), as well as factories, warehouses, and government buildings, all of which he turned over to the U.S. government for final disposition. Molineux received brevet promotion to major general in recognition of his accomplishments while serving in Georgia.

== Later career ==
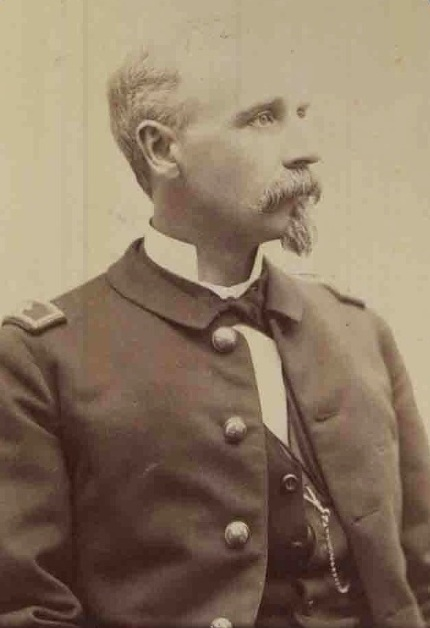
Molineux as a National Guard brigadier general, c. 1880

After the war, Molineux resided in Brooklyn, continued his career in paint manufacturing, and became the manager of the Devoe & Raynolds Company's Brooklyn factory. He subsequently acquired an ownership interest in the company and served on its board of directors. Molineux was also an inventor, and among the patents he received was one for his 1873 invention of a new method for preparing and packaging water colors. He was an organizer and officer of both the New York Paint, Oil and Varnish Club and the National Paint, Oil and Varnish Association.

Following his wartime service, Molineux continued his military service as a member of the New York National Guard. In 1868, he was appointed to command the NYNG's 2nd Division as a major general. In June 1879, he was assigned to command the state's 11th Brigade with the rank of brigadier general. In May 1884, he was promoted to major general and assigned to command the National Guard's 2nd Division, and he served until the position was eliminated in an 1887 reorganization of the National Guard. Molineux was active in both the Grand Army of the Republic and the Military Order of the Loyal Legion of the United States. He maintained an interest in current events and public policy and authored frequent magazine articles and newspaper articles on topics including public education and labor-management relations. From 1882 to 1884, he served as president of the National Rifle Association; he was preceded by Winfield Scott Hancock and succeeded by Ulysses S. Grant. Molineux's additional memberships included the Army and Navy Club of New York, the Oxford Club of Brooklyn, and the Masonic Veterans Association of Brooklyn.

In the late 1890s and early 1900s Molineux was heavily invested in the defense of his son Roland, who was accused of murder; the trials of People v. Molineux led to the creation of the Molineux rule, which limits use of prior crimes as evidence against a defendant in a criminal trial. Molineux died in Manhattan on June 10, 1915. He was buried at Saint James the Less Episcopal Church Cemetery in Scarsdale, New York.
