= William E. Werner =

American judge (1855–1916)

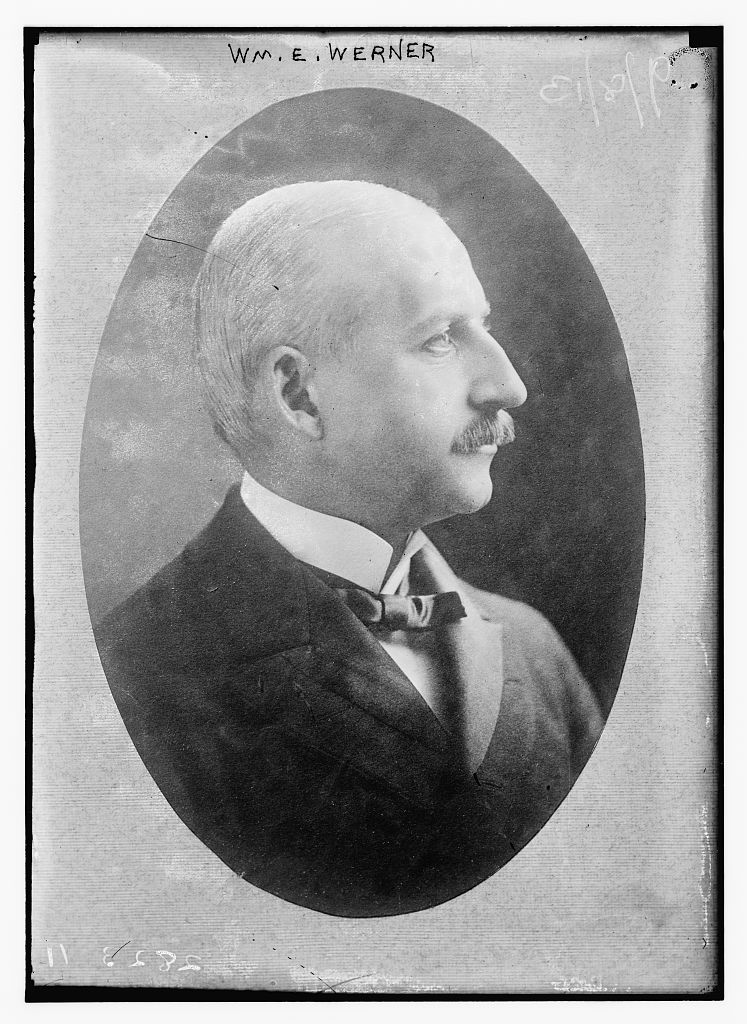

Associate Judge, New York Court of Appeals
- In office January 1, 1900 – March 1, 1916

Personal details
- Born: April 19, 1855 Buffalo, New York, U.S.
- Died: March 1, 1916 (aged 60) Rochester, New York, U.S.
- Resting place: Mount Hope Cemetery
- Political party: Republican; Democratic
- Spouse: Lillie Boller (m. 1889)
- Education: Bryant and Stratton's Business College
- Occupation: Lawyer; judge

William Edward Werner (April 19, 1855 – March 1, 1916) was an American lawyer and judge from New York.

== Early life ==
Werner was born on April 19, 1855, in Buffalo, New York, to Magdalena (or Margaret) and Peter Werner. His parents were German immigrants. He was educated in public schools in Buffalo prior to 1870. His parents died early, so he left school and worked as an errand boy, foundry worker and then farmhand. As a farmhand, he was able to return to school in the winter months. He returned to Buffalo and worked at a factory and attended Bryant and Stratton's Business College at night to study bookkeeping and commercial law. He then worked at a wholesale grocery firm as a bookkeeper.

In 1877, he moved to Rochester, and studied law in the offices of William H. Bowman at the Power Building, and later Dennis C. Feely. In 1879, he worked as a clerk in the Rochester Municipal Court. He was admitted to the bar in October 1880.

== Career ==
Werner practiced law in Rochester and established a partnership with Henry J. Hetzel. Their partnership lasted for four years. He was elected on the Republican ticket as special county judge of Monroe County in 1884, defeating A. P. Butts. He was re-elected unopposed as a Republican in 1887. In 1889 he was elected county judge as a Democrat to fill the vacancy of John S. Morgan. He served in that role until 1894. He was elected as a justice of the New York Supreme Court (7th District), following the death of Judge Macomber, serving from January 1, 1895, to 1904.

On January 1, 1900, he was appointed by Governor Theodore Roosevelt as an associate judge to the New York Court of Appeals. In 1904, he was elected to the position with a term expiring on December 31, 1918. He unsuccessfully sought nomination to the U.S. Supreme Court seat vacated by Rufus W. Peckham, which President Taft ultimately gave to Horace Harmon Lurton instead.

In Ives v. Southern Buffalo Railway Co. (1911), Werner held that the worker's compensation system created by the Wainright Compensation Act of 1910 was unconstitutional redistribution, prompting a 1913 state constitutional amendment. Werner's reasoning was criticized in the Harvard Law Review as inconsistent with other impositions of strict liability in tort law. The case is suspected to have been a collusive lawsuit since the plaintiff was a bachelor whose negligence was the primary cause of their occupational injury, his attorney's fee was higher than the potential payout, and the complaint and answer were filed on the same day. In New York Central Railroad Co. v. White (1916), the U.S. Supreme Court unanimously upheld the revised law.

In 1913, Werner ran on the Republican ticket for Chief Judge, but was defeated by Democrat Willard Bartlett. Werner remained on the bench as an associate judge and died in office. In 1913, he was a member of the High Court of Impeachment against Governor William Sulzer.

== Personal life ==
Werner married Lillie Boller of Buffalo on March 7, 1889. He lived on Oxford Street in Rochester.

Werner suffered from pernicious anaemia, and on February 9, 1916, had his spleen removed. He died a few weeks later on March 1 at Rochester General Hospital after pleurisy developed. He was buried at Mount Hope Cemetery.
