= Albert Cardozo =

American judge

- Born: Albert Jacob Cardozo; December 21, 1828; Philadelphia, Pennsylvania, U.S.
- Died: November 8, 1885 (aged 56); New York City, U.S.
- Occupation: Jurist
- Spouse: Rebecca Washington Nathan (m. 1854)
- Children: Benjamin (1870–1938)

Albert Jacob Cardozo (December 21, 1828 – November 8, 1885) was an American attorney and jurist in New York City. He is best known for his association with the Tammany Hall organization led by Boss Tweed.

== Early background ==
Albert Jacob Cardozo was born in Philadelphia, Pennsylvania, as the son of Ellen Hart and Michael H. Cardozo, Sephardic Jews of the Portuguese Jewish community. Sephardi Jews immigrated to the colonies in the 17th and 18th centuries from London. The family returned to New York, where Albert Cardozo went to school and read the law; he passed the bar and began practicing law in New York in 1849.

=== Family ===
He married Rebecca Washington (née Nathan). Her parents, Sara Seixas and Isaac Mendes Seixas Nathan, were also Sephardic Jews in New York City. Among their children was a daughter Nell and fraternal twins, Benjamin (future U.S. Supreme Court justice) and Emily, 11 years younger. After Rebecca died when the twins were young, Nell had a key role in rearing them.

== Career ==
Cardozo became a justice in 1864 of the Supreme Court of New York, that state's trial court. By 1866, Cardozo was working on behalf of Tammany Hall's William M. Tweed ring. Without seeing the applicants, many of whom had questionable citizenship, Cardozo granted naturalization papers for up to 800 persons per day.

He was implicated in a Tammany Hall judicial corruption scandal that was sparked by the Erie Railway takeover wars in 1868. The scandal led to the creation of the Association of the Bar of the City of New York, and to Cardozo's resignation from the bench in 1872. Cardozo was also responsible for allowing Jay Gould of the Erie Railroad to escape most of the debt Gould accumulated while trying to corner the gold market in 1869. Cardozo did this as a favor for William M. Tweed.

Albert Cardozo served as vice president and trustee of Congregation Shearith Israel in New York City; both his and his wife's family had belonged to the congregation, established in the 17th century.

Cardozo resumed the practice of law until his death.

== Death ==
He died in New York City on November 8, 1885.
