= Three Musketeers (Supreme Court) =

Nickname for certain members of US Supreme Court

The Three Musketeers of the U.S. Supreme Court

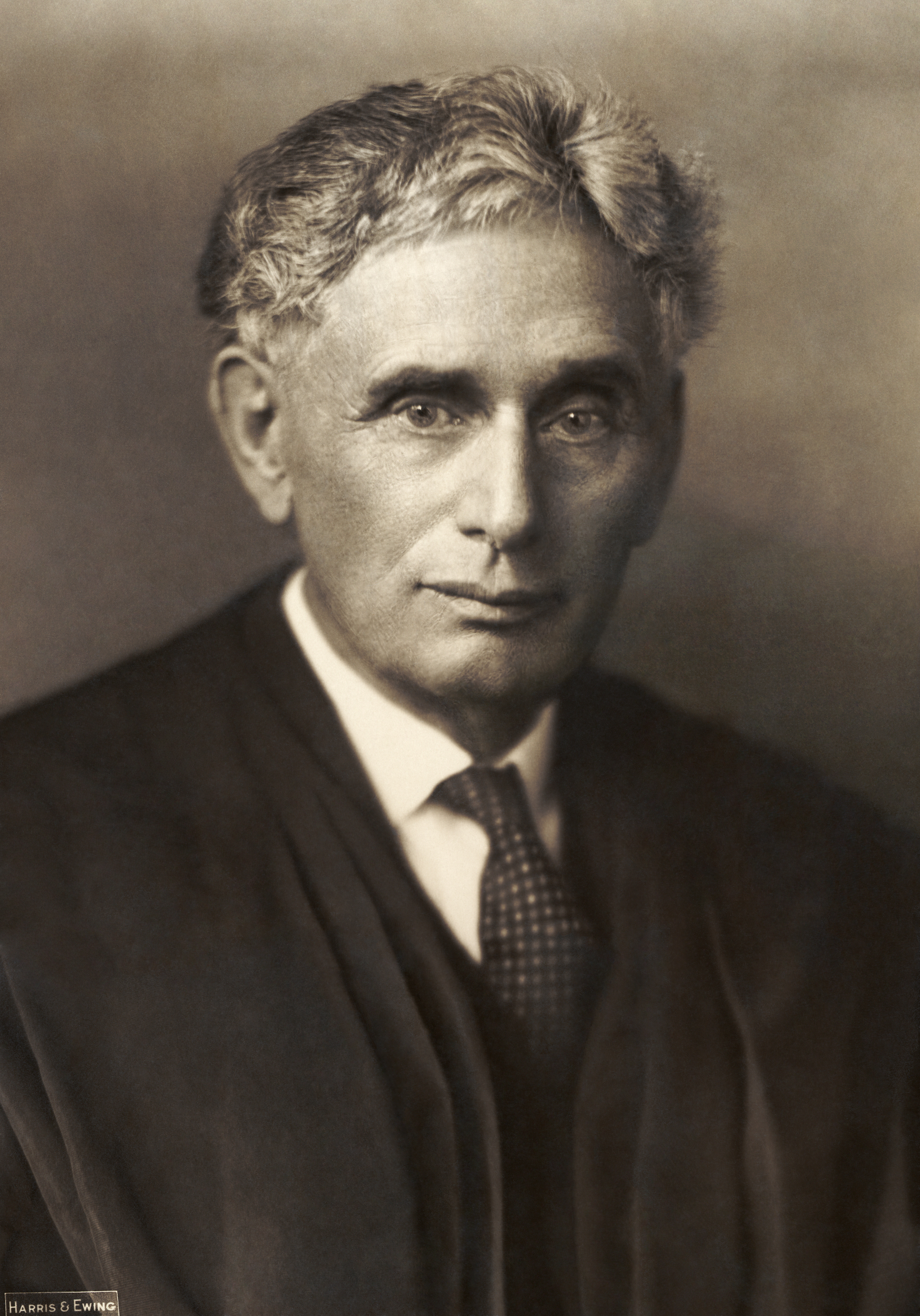
Brandeis

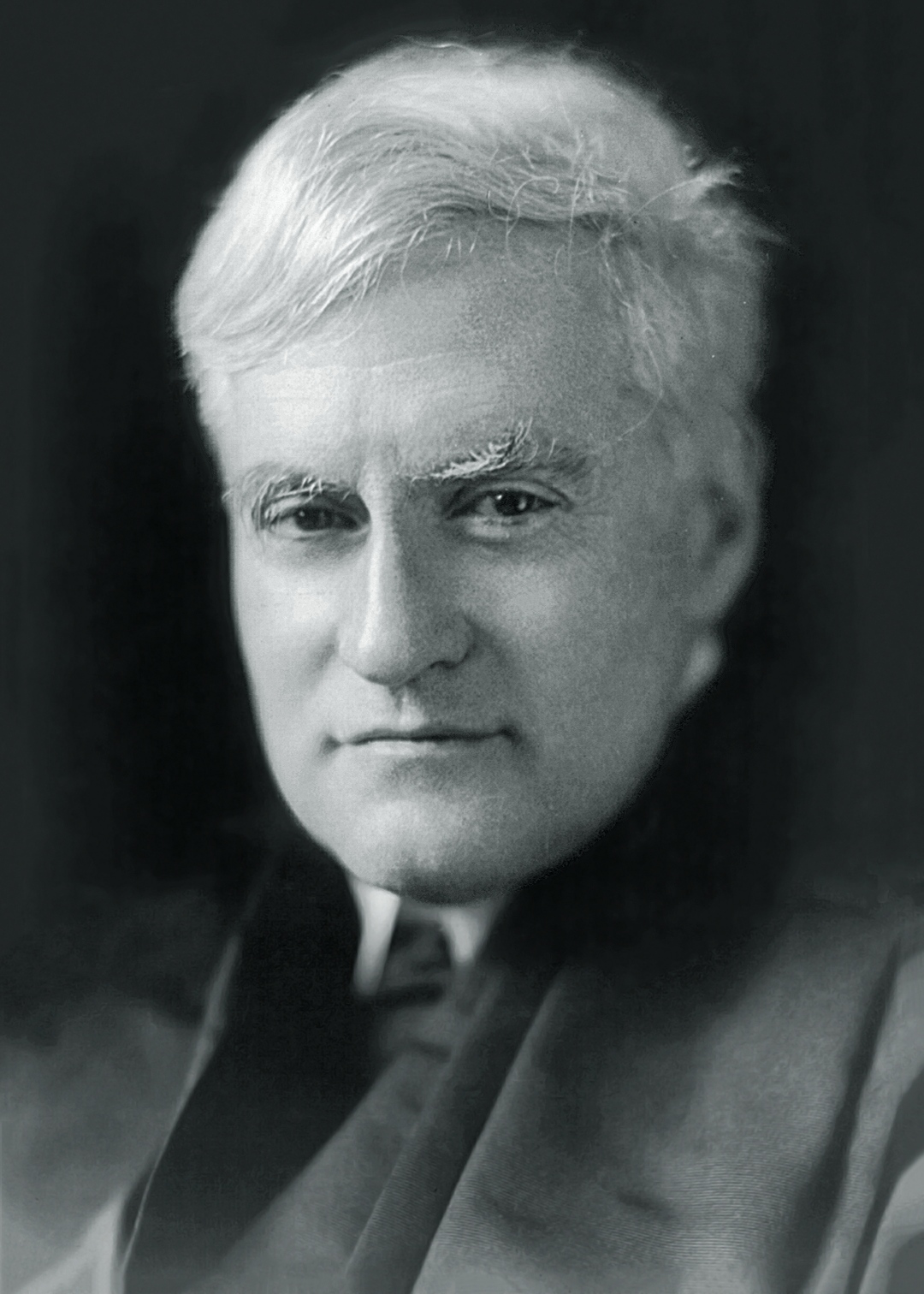
Cardozo

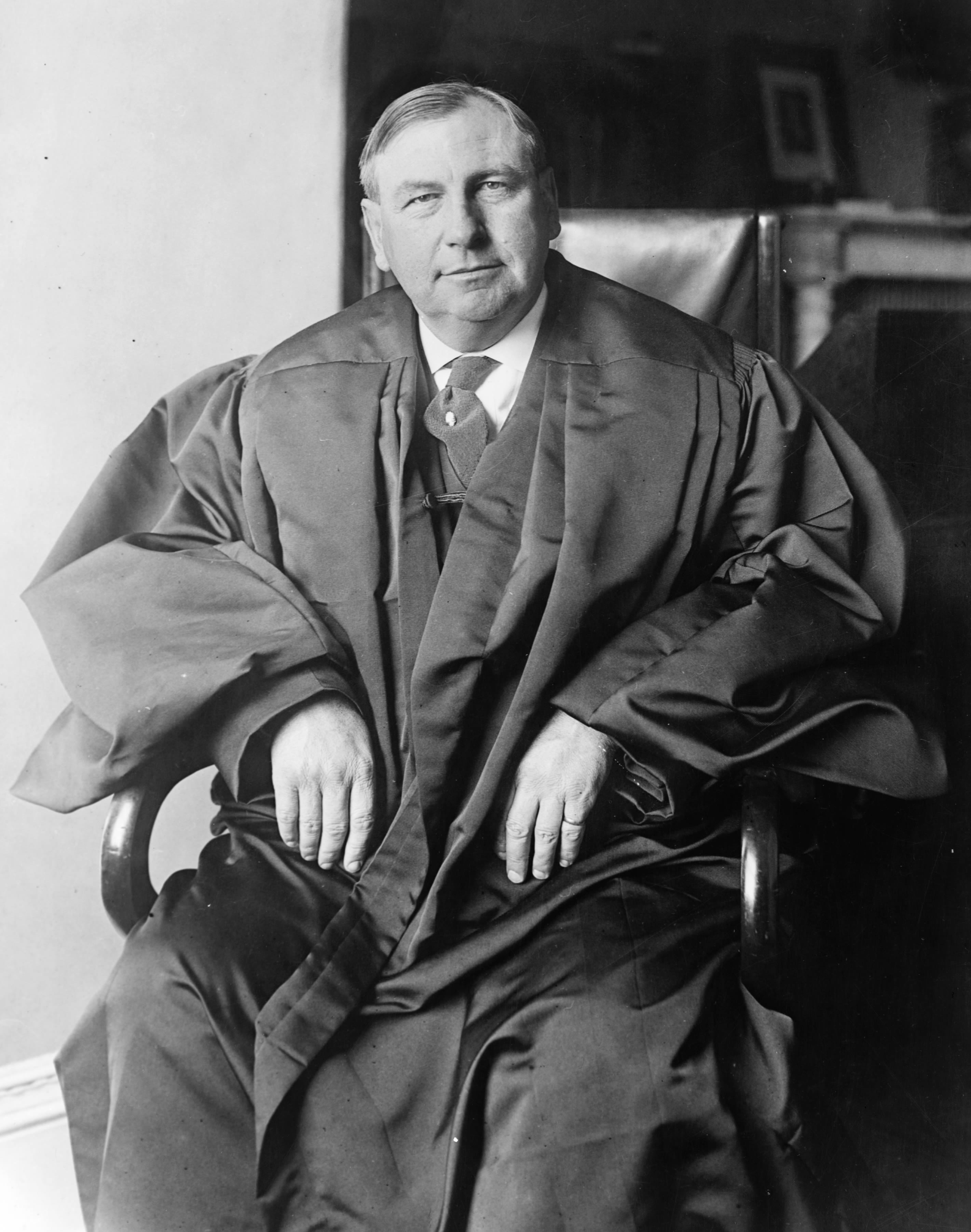
Stone

The "Three Musketeers" was the nickname given to three liberal members during the 1932–37 terms of the United States Supreme Court, who generally supported the New Deal agenda of President Franklin Delano Roosevelt. They were Justices Louis Brandeis, Benjamin N. Cardozo, and Harlan Fiske Stone. They were opposed by the "Four Horsemen", consisting of Justices James Clark McReynolds, George Sutherland, Willis Van Devanter, and Pierce Butler. Chief Justice Charles Evans Hughes and Justice Owen J. Roberts controlled the balance. Charles Evans Hughes often voted with the liberal wing while Owen J. Roberts voted with the conservatives. With the help of Roberts, the Four Horsemen maintained a majority in most of the decisions and struck down many New Deal laws as unconstitutional. Although the "Three Musketeers" were a bipartisan group, with Stone being a Republican, they were drawn together by their shared views on New Deal policies.

During the 1935 term, the Four Horsemen would often ride (in a car) together to and from the Court to coordinate their positions. To counter them, the Three Musketeers started meeting at Brandeis's apartment on Friday afternoons. However, the Four Horsemen held sway, leading to Roosevelt's court-packing scheme. In 1937, in the "switch in time that saved nine," Roberts and Hughes switched to the liberal side in several key decisions, the most important one being West Coast Hotel Co. v. Parrish, a case regarding the minimum wage of workers. Within a year, Van Devanter and Sutherland retired and were replaced by Hugo Black and Stanley Reed, strong New Dealers, ending the Four Horsemen's sway. By 1941, Brandeis, Cardozo, Butler, McReynolds, and Hughes were also gone. Only Stone and Roberts remained, and by then Stone had been elevated to the position of Chief Justice.

The Three Musketeers were successful in many cases. They often convinced the swing voters, Charles Evans Hughes and Owen Roberts, to vote for New Deal policies. The Three Musketeers were able to uphold many New Deal laws such as the Gold Reserve Act (in the Gold Clause Cases), The Fair Labor Standards Act (in United States v. Darby Lumber Co.), the Tennessee Valley Authority (in Ashwander v. Tennessee Valley Authority) and the Social Security Act (in Steward Machine Co. v. Davis and Helvering v. Davis). They persuaded members of the Four Horsemen to vote to uphold New Deal legislation occasionally.
