= The Nature of the Judicial Process =

1921 book by Benjamin N. Cardozo

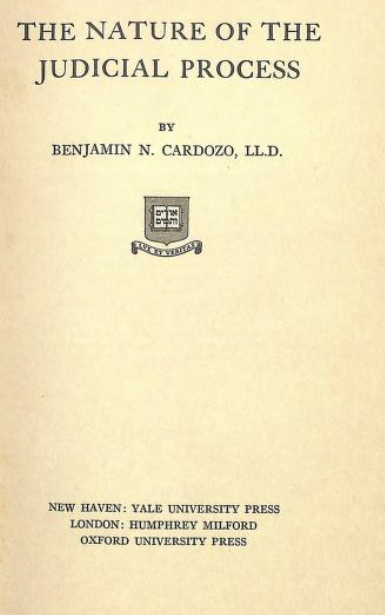
- Title page for The Nature of the Judicial Process (1921)
- Author: Benjamin N. Cardozo
- Language: English
- Publisher: Yale University Press
- Publication date: 1921
- Publication place: United States

The Nature of the Judicial Process is a legal classic written by Associate Justice of the United States Supreme Court, and New York Court of Appeals Chief Judge Benjamin N. Cardozo in 1921. It was compiled from The Storrs Lectures delivered at Yale Law School earlier that year.

== Summary ==
The central question of The Nature of the Judicial Process is how judges should decide cases. Cardozo's answer is that judges should do what they have always done in the Anglo-American legal tradition, namely, follow and apply the law in easy cases, and make new law in hard cases by balancing competing considerations, including the paramount value of social welfare. Cardozo identifies four leading methods of legal analysis: (1) the method of logic (or "analogy," or "philosophy"), which seeks to extend legal principles in ways that preserve logical consistency; (2) the method of history (or "evolution"), which adverts to the historical origins of the legal rule or concept; (3) the method of custom (or "tradition"), which views social customs as helpful guides to community values and settled expectations; and (4) the method of sociology, which looks to considerations of reason, justice, utility, and social welfare. Each of these methods may have their "preponderating value" in particular cases. No simple test or rigid formula can decide which method should prevail in a given case. But in difficult cases where a legal rule is outmoded or the law contains "gaps" that must be filled, judges should frankly play the role of legislators and let "the welfare of society fix the path."

Cardozo admits that there are risks in judicial lawmaking. To minimize these, he points to a number of factors that significantly limit judicial discretion. First, judges may make new law only "interstitially," that is, when the law contains gaps or a legal rule is clearly obsolete. Second, judges in their exercise of judicial review should never strike down a law unless it is "so plainly arbitrary and oppressive that right-minded men and women could not reasonably regard" it otherwise. Finally, when judges invoke norms such as "reason," "justice," or "social advantage" when employing the method of sociology, they should look to community standards rather than to their own personal values. In the Anglo-American system of law, Cardozo remarks, a judge "is not a knight-errant, roaming at will in pursuit of his own ideal of beauty or of goodness." In the final balance, a judge's freedom to innovate is insignificant "compared with the bulk and pressure of the rules that hedge him on every side."

In claiming that judges do and must make law, Cardozo was siding with Oliver Wendell Holmes Jr., Roscoe Pound, John Chipman Gray, and other American "proto-realists" of his day who were challenging the traditional "oracular" or "mechanical" or "formalist" view of judicial reasoning. On that view, judges never make law, they simply discover pre-existing law and apply it. According to strict formalists, there are no hard cases where the law is silent, or ambiguous, or vague, or contradictory, or couched in broad generalities. Rather, the law is clear, consistent, and complete; all legal questions have a single correct answer; and judges are (in Blackstone's phrase) "living oracles" who deduce inexorable legal conclusions from indisputable legal axioms.

Formalism was not Cardozo's only target in The Nature of the Judicial Process. He also attacked radical critics of formalism, such as John Chipman Gray, who claimed that judges have immense freedom and rejected the very idea of law as a set of binding rules. Gray and other proto-realists of the time tried to demystify law and view it with hard-headed pragmatism. They argued that since judges are the ultimate arbiters of law, "law" in the final analysis is whatever judges say it is (or what they predictably will say it is in the future). Cardozo argued that this is not an "analysis" of law, but a denial that any true law exists. The proto-realists confuse right with power. Judges may have the power to ignore settle legal standards, but they do not have the right. Moreover, the attempt to identify law with judicial rulings ignores the fact that the great majority of legal questions have clear, uncontroversial answers that guide everyday conduct and are never litigated in courts.

== Reception and influence ==
The Nature of the Judicial Process established Cardozo "as one of the leading jurists of his time" and "has become a classic of legal education." Its continuing appeal is due, in part, to its self-effacing tone, its lapidary prose, and its attempt to strike a happy medium between legal formalism and radical realist theories that wholly reject traditional views of law, legal reasoning, judicial restraint, and the rule of law.

The great success of Cardozo's The Nature of the Judicial Process created demand for further reflections on the law. In two later works, The Growth of Law (1924) and The Paradoxes of Legal Science (1927), Cardozo refined, deepened, and to some extent modified the views of law laid out in The Nature of the Judicial Process.

== Notable quotations ==
- The great generalities of the constitution have a content and a significance that vary from age to age. (17)
- Nothing is stable. Nothing absolute. All is fluid and changeable. There is an endless "becoming." We are back with Heraclitus. (28)
- The final cause of law is the welfare of society. (66)
- A constitution states or ought to state not rules for the passing hour, but principles for an expanding future. (83)
- The great ideals of liberty and equality are preserved against the assaults of opportunism, the expediency of the passing hour, the erosion of small encroachments, the scorn and derision of those who have no patience with general principles, by enshrining them in constitutions, and consecrating to the task of their protection a body of defenders. (92)
- The judge, even when he is free, is still not wholly free. He is not to innovate at pleasure. He is not a knight-errant, roaming at will in pursuit of his own ideal of beauty or of goodness. He is to draw his inspiration from consecrated principles. (141)
- We shall have to feel our way here as elsewhere in the law. Somewhere between worship of the past and exaltation of the present, the path of safety will be found. (160)
- I was much troubled in spirit, in my first years upon the bench, to find how trackless was the ocean on which I had embarked. I sought for certainty. I was oppressed and disheartened when I found that the quest for it was futile. I was trying to reach land, the solid land of fixed and settled rules, the paradise of a justice that would declare itself by tokens plainer and more commanding than its pale and glimmering reflections in my own vacillating mind and conscience. (166)
- The great tides and currents which engulf the rest of men do not turn aside in their course and pass the judges by. (168)
- The future . . . is yours. We have been called to do our parts in an ageless process. Long after I am dead and gone, and my little part in it is forgotten, you will be here to do your share, and to carry the torch forward. I know that the flame will burn bright while the torch is in your keeping. (179-80)
