= 159th New York Infantry Regiment =

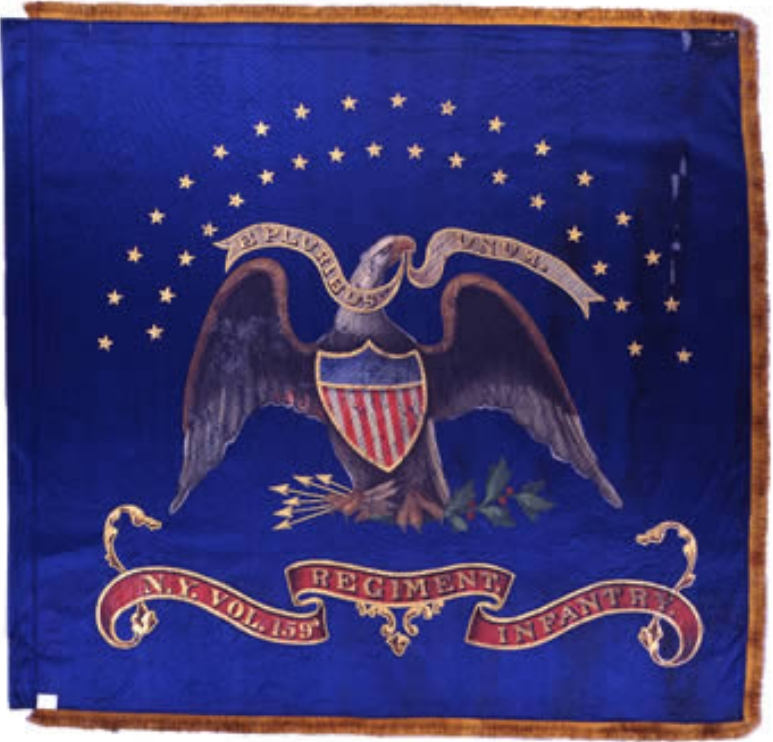
- 159th Regimental Color
- Active: August 28, 1862 – October 23, 1865
- Country: United States
- Allegiance: Union
- Branch: Infantry
- Engagements: Bayou Teche Campaign; Battle of Irish Bend; Siege of Port Hudson; Red River Campaign; Battle of Mansura; Bermuda Hundred Campaign; Third Battle of Winchester; Battle of Fisher's Hill; Battle of Cedar Creek

The 159th New York Infantry Regiment was an infantry regiment in the Union Army during the American Civil War.

== Service ==
The 159th New York Infantry was organized at New York City, New York beginning August 28, 1862 and mustered in for three-years service on November 1, 1862, under the command of Colonel Homer Augustus Nelson.

The regiment was attached to Grover's Division, Department of the Gulf, to January 1863. 3rd Brigade, 4th Division, XIX Corps, Department of the Gulf, to August 1863. 1st Brigade, 4th Division, XIX Corps, to February 1864. 2nd Brigade, 2nd Division, XIX Corps, Department of the Gulf, to July 1864, and Army of the Shenandoah, Middle Military Division, to January 1865. 2nd Brigade, Grover's Division, District of Savannah, Georgia, Department of the South, to March 1865. 3rd Brigade, 1st Division, X Corps, Army of the Ohio, to May 1865. District of Savannah, Georgia, Department of the South, to July 1865. District of Augusta, Georgia, Department of Georgia, to October 1865.

The 159th New York Infantry mustered out of service October 23, 1865 at Augusta, Georgia.

== Detailed service ==
Left New York for New Orleans, Louisiana, December 4, 1862. Occupation of Baton Rouge, Louisiana, December 17, 1862, and duty there until March 1863. Operations against Port Hudson, Louisiana, March 7–27. Moved to Donaldsonville March 28, then to Berwick April 9. Operations in Western Louisiana April 9 – May 14. Expedition to Franklin and Opelousas, Bayou Teche Campaign, April 11–20. Irish Bend April 14. Bayou Vermilion April 17. Opelousas April 20. Expedition to Alexandria and Simsport May 5–18. Moved to Port Hudson May 22–25. Siege of Port Hudson May 25 – July 9. Assaults on Port Hudson May 27 and June 14. Surrender of Port Hudson July 9. Duty at Thibodeauxville until March 1864. Red River Campaign March 25 – May 22. Cane River Crossing April 23. Construction of dam at Alexandria April 30-May 10. Retreat to Morganza May 13–20. Mansura May 16. Duty at Morganza until July. Moved to New Orleans, Louisiana, then to Fort Monroe and Bermuda Hundred, Virginia, July 17–25. Duty in trenches at Bermuda Hundred until July 31. Moved to Washington, D.C., July 31 – August 2. Sheridan's Shenandoah Valley Campaign August 7 – November 28. Near Charlestown August 21–22. Third Battle of Winchester September 19. Fisher's Hill September 22. Battle of Cedar Creek October 19. Duty at Kernstown and Winchester until January 1865. Moved to Savannah, Georgia, January 5–22, and duty there until March 5. Moved to Wilmington, North Carolina, March 5; then to Morehead City, North Carolina, March 10, and duty there until April 8. Moved to Goldsboro, North Carolina, April 8; then to Savannah, Georgia, May 2. Duty there and in the Department of Georgia until October.

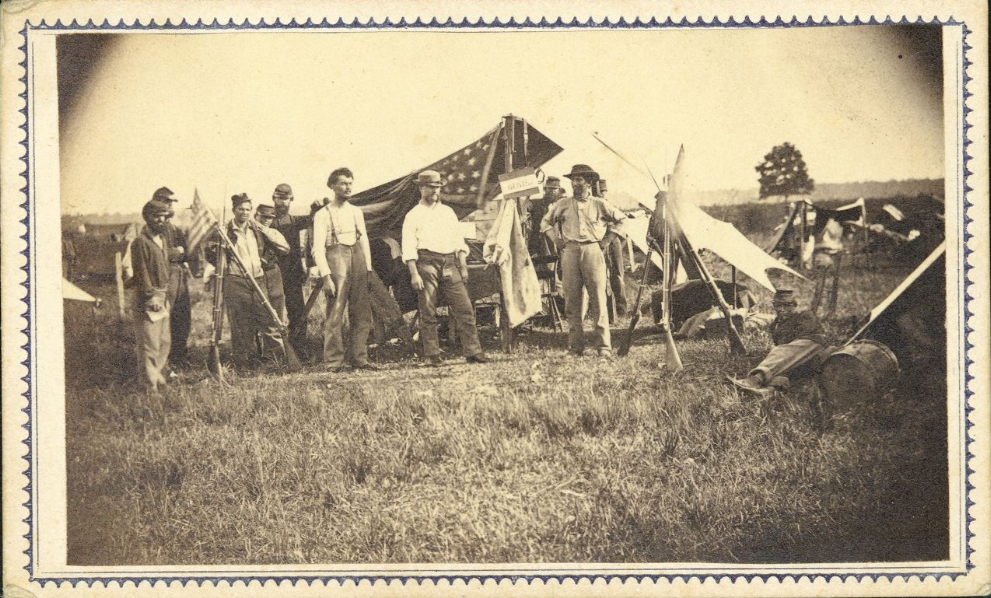
159th New York Volunteer Infantry at Donaldsonville, Louisiana, c1863

== Casualties ==
The regiment lost a total of 215 men during service; 10 officers and 74 enlisted men killed or mortally wounded, 1 officer and 130 enlisted men died of disease.

== Commanders ==
- Colonel Homer Augustus Nelson
- Colonel Edward L. Molineux

== See also ==
- List of New York Civil War regiments
- New York in the Civil War
