= Chester B. McLaughlin =

American judge (1856–1929)

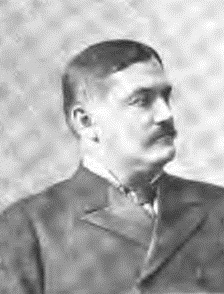
Chester B. McLaughlin (1897)

Chester Bentine McLaughlin (February 10, 1856 – May 12, 1929) was an American lawyer and politician from New York.

== Life ==
He was born on February 10, 1856, in Moriah, Essex County, New York, the son of Lyman McLaughlin and Harriet C. McLaughlin. He graduated from the University of Vermont. He married Lucy Warner.

He lived at Port Henry, New York. He was Judge and Surrogate of the Essex County Court from 1891 to 1895. He was a delegate to the New York State Constitutional Convention of 1894. He was a justice of the New York Supreme Court (4th District) from 1896 to 1917, since 1898 on the Appellate Division (1st Dept).

On January 16, 1917, he was appointed by Governor Charles S. Whitman to the New York Court of Appeals to fill the vacancy caused by the election of Frank H. Hiscock as Chief Judge. In November 1917, he was elected on the Republican and Democratic tickets to a full term on the Court of Appeals, and remained on the bench until the end of 1926 when he reached the constitutional age limit of 70 years.

He died on May 12, 1929, in Albany, New York; and was buried at the Moriah Cemetery in Moriah.
