= Mike DeCicco =

American fencing coach (1927-2013)

Michael DeCicco (November 16, 1927 - March 29, 2013) was an American fencing coach, known for his work at the University of Notre Dame for 41 years. In 1945, he joined Notre Dame but left in 1949 to study at college. In 1954, he re-joined Notre Dame and served as assistant to Walter Langford, and in 1962 became official head coach of Notre Dame. He founded the academic advising program in 1964 and also founded the Junior World Fencing Championships for Notre Dame. He had a wife, with whom he had five children. DeCiccio died of natural causes at the age of 8.
