= Molineux hearing =

Type of pre-trial hearing in New York State

A Molineux hearing is a New York State pre-trial hearing on the admissibility of evidence of prior charged or uncharged crimes by the defendant in a criminal trial. In most cases, evidence of prior uncharged crimes is not admissible because of its potential prejudicial effect. Under certain circumstances, it may be admissible. If the prosecutor wishes to bring in evidence of prior uncharged crimes, they request a Molineux hearing. The judge decides whether the evidence is admissible.

The name of the hearing process refers to the case of People v. Molineux, 168 N.Y. 264 (1901), which established the process as precedent.

== See also ==
- In limine
- Judiciary of New York
- Law of New York
