= 1907 New York state election =

The 1907 New York state election was held on November 5, 1907, to elect two judges of the New York Court of Appeals, as well as all members of the New York State Assembly.

== History ==
In 1907, there were only two state officer to be elected statewide: two judges of the Court of Appeals, to succeed Denis O'Brien who had reached the constitutional age limit of 70 years, and Edward T. Bartlett whose fourteen-year term would expire at the end of the year.

The Independence League state convention met on September 28 at Carnegie Hall in New York City. Reuben Robie Lyon was Temporary Chairman. They nominated Reuben Robie Lyon, a lawyer of Bath; and Republican John T. McDonough - a former Secretary of State of New York and justice of the Supreme Court of the Philippines - for the Court of Appeals.

The Republican State Committee met on October 4. Timothy L. Woodruff was Chairman. They re-nominated the incumbent Edward T. Bartlett, and nominated Democrat Willard Bartlett - who occupied an additional seat on the Court of Appeals - to succeed Denis O'Brien. The Democratic State Committee met three hours later. William James Conners was Chairman. They endorsed the Republican nominees, thus effecting a cross endorsement deal without talking with the other party.

== Result ==
The jointly nominated judges were elected.

The incumbent Edward T. Bartlett was re-elected. Willard Bartlett continued on the Court, moving from an additional to a regular seat.

1907 state election results
Office	Republican ticket		Democratic ticket		Independence League ticket		Socialist ticket		Prohibition ticket	
Judge of the Court of Appeals	Edward T. Bartlett	1,084,755	Edward T. Bartlett	92,405	Reuben Robie Lyon	114,209	Thomas Crimmins	23,798	Coleridge A. Hart	18,775
Judge of the Court of Appeals	Willard Bartlett	1,055,849	Willard Bartlett	112,948	John T. McDonough	121,304	Thomas A. Hopkins	23,382	Erwin J. Baldwin	18,570

== See also ==
- New York state elections

== Sources ==
- Partial result: STEADY DECLINE OF HEARST LEAGUE in NYT on November 7, 1907
- Vote totals taken from The New York Red Book 1907
- Result: The Tribune Almanac 1908
