= Seixas =

Seixas ([ˈsɐjʃɐʃ] or [ˈsejʃɐs]) is a common Galician and Portuguese surname. It may refer to:

- Carlos Seixas – Portuguese composer of the 18th century
- Gershom Mendes Seixas – minister of Congregation Shearith Israel
- Francisco Seixas da Costa – Portuguese diplomat and former politician
- Vic Seixas (1923–2024) – American top-10 tennis player
- Raul Seixas – Brazilian rock musician
- Alberto Seixas Santos – Portuguese film director
- Ponta do Seixas – easternmost point of South America
- Paul Seixas - French cyclist
