= Workers' compensation (United States) =

Insurance for injured employees in the United States

Workers' compensation (which formerly was known as workmen's compensation until the name was changed to make it gender neutral) in the United States is a primarily state-based system of workers' compensation.

In the United States, some form of workers compensation is typically compulsory for almost all employers in most states (depending upon the features of the organization), with the notable exception of Texas as of 2018. Regardless of compulsory requirements, businesses may purchase insurance voluntarily, and in the United States policies typically include Part One for compulsory coverage and Part Two for non-compulsory coverage.

By 1949, every state had enacted a workers' compensation program.

== History ==
The Accident Insurance Law of 1884 instituted by German Chancellor Otto von Bismarck served as a model for the rest of Europe and the United States. American journalists, policymakers, and social scientists subsequently debated whether to adopt the German welfare system or the British approach, which preserved the beneficiary's right to sue. Prior to compensation laws, the United States dealt with employee injuries entirely through litigation. The law made an "unholy trinity" of tort defenses available to employers, including contributory negligence, assumption of risk, and the fellow servant rule. As a result, injured employees and their families typically lost lawsuits over workplace injuries.

In 1855, Georgia and Alabama passed Employer Liability Acts based on the British Employers' Liability Act 1880; 26 other states passed similar acts between 1855 and 1907. Early laws permitted injured employees to sue the employer and then prove a negligent act or omission. New York's 1910 law was declared unconstitutional by the New York Court of Appeals in the landmark decision of Ives v. South Buffalo Railway on March 24, 1911, one day before the Triangle Shirtwaist Factory Fire. According to law professor John Fabian Witt, the Ives decision represents the "rupture" between an old paradigm that was dying and a new paradigm that was gradually emerging in American law, society, and politics. The massive public reaction to Ives led to the triumph of the American workers' compensation movement and crushed the judicial legacy of the author of the Ives opinion, Judge William E. Werner. Werner's philosophy of free labor and freedom of contract was replaced by legal requirements based on scientific management, actuarial risk, and insurance.

After the 1906 Federal Employers Liability Act was held unconstitutional for instituting a worker's compensation scheme over all employees of railroads engaged in interstate commerce, a revised version was passed in 1908 to only cover employees who were personally engaged in interstate commerce and thus within Congress' Commerce Clause authority. The 1916 Federal Employees' Compensation Act created a similar system for federal civil service employees. In 1911, Wisconsin became the first state to pass a comprehensive law that was not successfully challenged in the courts. It was drafted by Daniel Hoan, who later served as the Socialist mayor of Milwaukee from 1916 to 1940. By 1949, every state in the country had enacted a workers' compensation program. These early laws generally restricted a husband's ability to recover for his wife's injuries until Wengler v. Druggists Mut. Ins. Co. (1980) held such sex-based discrimination unconstitutional under the Equal Protection Clause.

In the early 20th century workers' compensation laws varied between states in the degree to which they were voluntary or required. In some states, employers were forced to become liable for the costs of employees' injuries. In other states, employers could choose whether or not to fall under compensation laws. In still other states, employers had the choice whether to fall under compensation laws, but if they chose not to they ran greater risks of employee injury lawsuits.

In some states, employers argued in court that compulsory participation laws were unconstitutional and violated the 14th amendment, which required due process before a person or entity could be deprived of property. In 1917, the issue of due process was resolved by the United States Supreme Court in New York Central Railway Co. v. White which held that an employer's due process rights were not impeded by mandatory workers' compensation. Following this ruling, each state instituted different threshold requirements. The adoption of the workers' compensation laws led to changes in how workplace accidents are compensated. Compensation is no longer based on the worker showing that the employer was at fault, nor can compensation be denied if the worker's negligence contributes to the injury. Nearly all employers are required to have insurance to cover payments for: (1) medical costs resulting from occupational injuries and some occupational illnesses suffered by workers; and (2) partial replacement of injured or ill workers' lost wages, also known as indemnity. One unfortunate side effect of compensation laws in their early days was to create incentives for employers to fire or refuse to hire employees with disabilities or health conditions that made them more expensive to insure, such as a person with only one eye.

== Modern practice ==
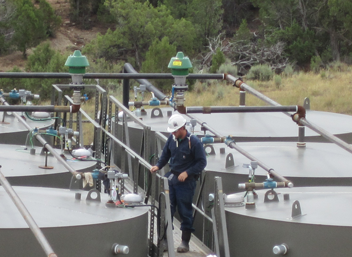
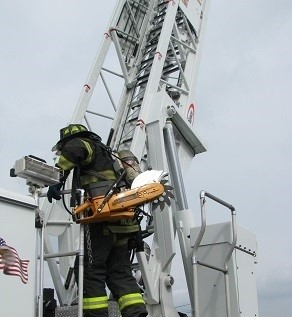
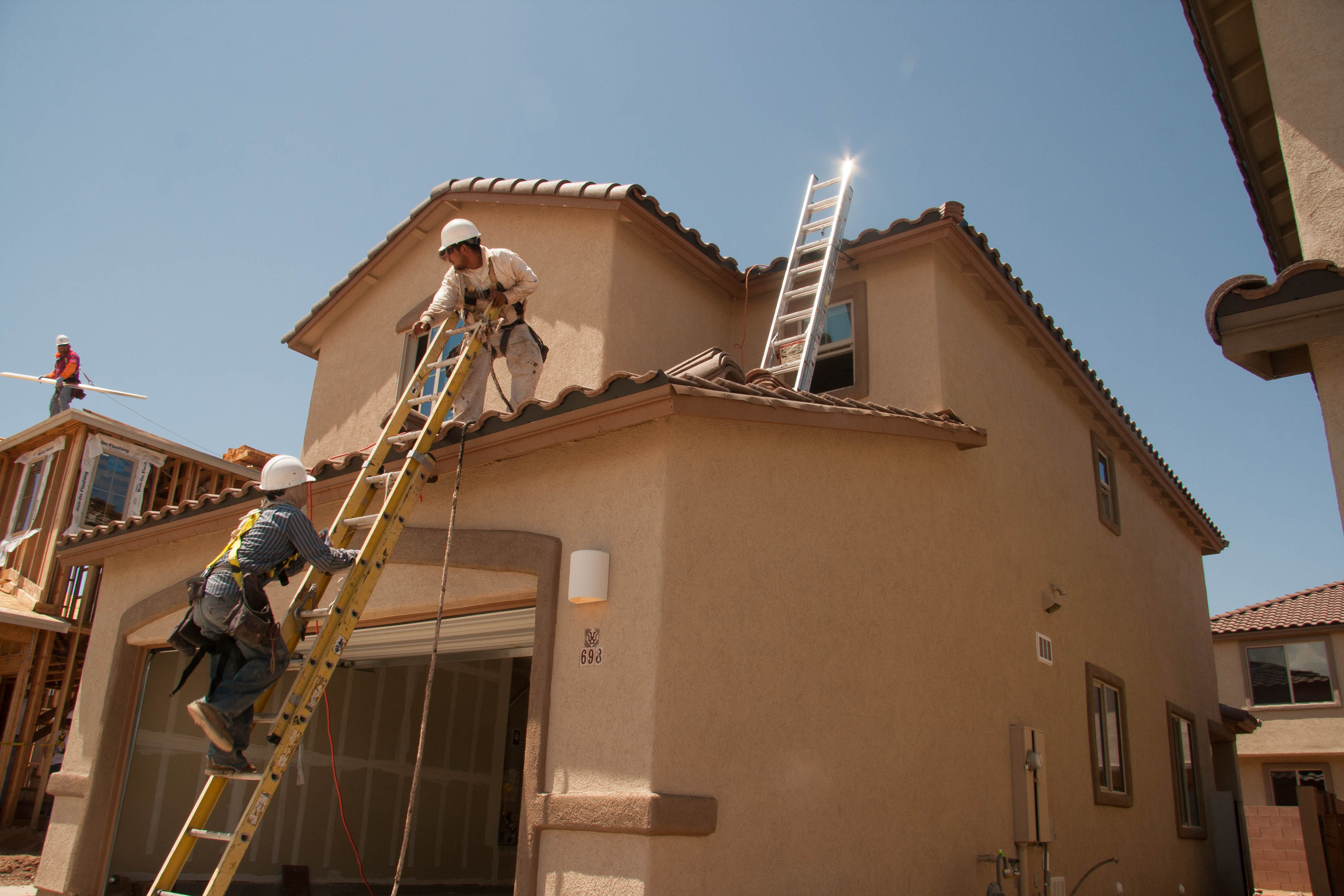
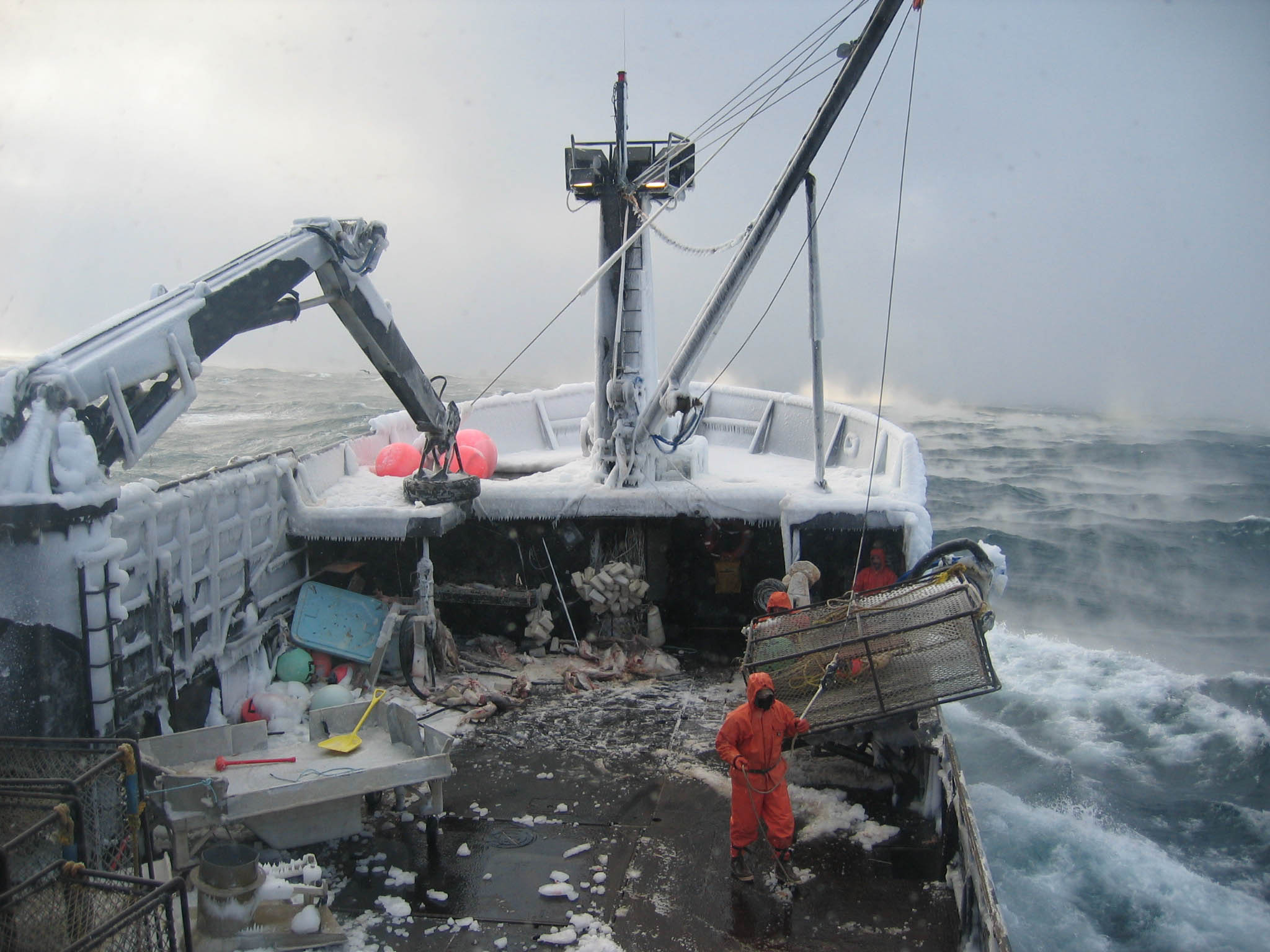
Types of jobs that involve dangerous tasks. Clockwise from upper left: Oil rig worker, firefighter, crab fisherman, construction worker.

In the United States, most employees who are injured on the job receive medical care responsive to the workplace injury, and, in some cases, payment to compensate for resulting disabilities. Generally, an injury that occurs when an employee is on their way to or from work does not qualify for workers' compensation benefits; however, there are some exceptions if an employee's responsibilities demand that they be in multiple locations, or stay in the course of their employment after work hours.

There are two methods by which an employer can comply with its obligation to provide workers' compensation coverage for its employees. Very large organizations and governments may choose to "self-insure" in which the organization obtains permission from the workers' compensation agency to pay claims directly, without being required to carry insurance.

Smaller organizations must, and self-insured organizations may, purchase a workers' compensation insurance policy to cover obligations for work-related injuries to employees. Some self-insured organizations will use a "hybrid" approach, hiring an insurance company to investigate workers' compensation claims, but paying the claims itself out of its own pockets.

Insurance policies are available to employers through commercial insurance companies: if the employer is deemed an excessive risk to insure at market rates, it can obtain coverage through an assigned-risk program. In many states, there are public uninsured employer funds to pay benefits to workers employed by companies who illegally fail to purchase insurance.

Various organizations focus resources on providing education and guidance to workers' compensation administrators and adjudicators in various state and national workers' compensation systems. These include the American Bar Association (ABA), the International Association of Industrial Accident Boards and Commissions (IAIABC), the National Association of Workers' Compensation Judiciary (NAWCJ), and the Workers Compensation Research Institute.

In the United States, according to the Bureau of Labor Statistics' 2010 National Compensation Survey, workers' compensation costs represented 1.6% of employer spending overall, although rates varied significantly across industry sectors. For instance, workers' compensation accounted for 4.4% of employer spending in the construction industry, 1.8% in manufacturing and 1.3% in services.

Clinical outcomes for patients with workers' compensation tend to be worse compared to those non-workers' compensation patients among those undergoing upper extremity surgeries, and have found they tend to take longer to return to their jobs and tend to return to work at lower rates. Factors that might explain this outcome include this patient population having strenuous upper extremity physical demands, and a possible financial gain from reporting significant post-operative disability.

== State laws ==
As each state within the United States has its own workers' compensation laws, the circumstances under which workers' compensation is available to workers, the amount of benefits that a worker may receive, and the duration of the benefits paid to an injured worker, vary by state. The workers' compensation system is administered on a state-by-state basis, with a state governing board overseeing varying public/private combinations of workers' compensation systems. The names of such governing boards, or "quasi-judicial agencies", vary from state to state, many being designated as "workers' compensation commissions". In North Carolina, the state entity responsible for administering the workers' compensation system is referred to as the North Carolina Industrial Commission. In Michigan, the Workers' Disability Compensation Agency administers Michigan's Workers' Disability Compensation Act, which provides benefits to cover medical expenses and lost wages for workers who suffer injuries on the job.

In a majority of states, workers' compensation is solely provided by private insurance companies. Twelve states operate state funds (that serve as models to private insurers and insures state employees), and a handful of states have state-owned monopoly insurance providers. To keep state funds from crowding out private insurers, the state funds may be required to act as assigned-risk programs or insurers of last resort for businesses that cannot obtain coverage from a private insurer. In contrast, private insurers can turn away the worst risks and may also write comprehensive insurance packages covering general liability, natural disasters, and other forms of insurance coverage. Of the twelve state funds, the largest is California's State Compensation Insurance Fund.

=== Reporting ===
Underreporting of injuries is a significant problem in the workers' compensation system. Workers, fearing retaliation from their employers, may avoid reporting injuries incurred on the job and instead seek treatment privately, bearing the cost themselves or passing these costs on to their health insurance provider—an element in the increasing cost of health insurance nationwide.

Typically, workers can only receive compensation for injuries received while on the job, but in some states there are exceptions: traveling salespersons and similar employees can be covered if they are injured while taking a work-related trip, employees who are sent on special errands can receive compensation for injuries received on those errands. In some cases workers who, though not currently working, suffer injuries while on the premises of the employer can also receive compensation.

In all states except Georgia and Mississippi, it is illegal for an employer to terminate or refuse to hire an employee for having reported a workplace injury or filed a workers' compensation claim. However, it is often not easy to prove discrimination on the basis of the employee's claims history. To abate discrimination of this type, some states have created a "subsequent injury trust fund" which will reimburse insurers for benefits paid to workers who suffer aggravation or recurrence of a compensable injury. It is also suggested that laws should be made to prohibit inclusion of claims history in databases or to make it anonymous. (See privacy laws.)

=== Employer liability ===
Although workers' compensation statutes generally make the employer completely immune from any liability (such as for negligence) above the amount provided by the workers' compensation statutory framework, there are exceptions. In some states, like New Jersey, an employer can still be held liable for larger amounts if the employee proves the employer intentionally caused the harm, while in other states, like Pennsylvania, the employer is immune in all circumstances, but other entities involved in causing the injury, like subcontractors or product manufacturers, may still be held liable. In most scenarios, workers' comp laws in California prevent employees from suing their employers for work-related injuries.

=== Appeals ===
If a workers' compensation claim is denied, for example because an employer or employee fail to follow proper procedures when reporting the injury or if the insurance company does not believe the claim, the injured worker may appeal the denial. In most states, workers compensation claims are handled by administrative law judges or magistrates, who often act as triers of fact. In some states, the injured worker (or their attorney) will also have the option of settling or redeeming their workers' compensation claim, accepting a lump sum in exchange for relinquishing their right to further benefits.In Florida, undocumented workers may appeal after being denied workers' compensation, because Florida law specifies that undocumented workers are still entitled to workers' compensation benefits if they are injured while on the job.

According to one 2018 study, 70% of initially denied claims are ultimately paid.

Some employers and insurance companies vigorously contest employee claims for workers' compensation payments. Injured workers may be able to get help with their claims from state agencies or by retaining a workers' compensation lawyer. Laws in many states limit a claimant's legal expenses to a certain fraction of an award; such "contingency fees" are payable only if the recovery is successful. In some states this fee can be as high as 40% or as little as 11% of the monetary award recovered, if any.

In the vast majority of states, original jurisdiction over workers' compensation disputes has been transferred by statute from the trial courts to special administrative agencies. Within such agencies, disputes are usually handled informally by administrative law judges. Appeals may be taken to an appeals board and from there into the state court system. However, such appeals are difficult and are regarded skeptically by most state appellate courts, because the point of workers' compensation was to reduce litigation. A few states still allow the employee to initiate a lawsuit in a trial court against the employer. For example, Ohio allows appeals to go before a jury.

In California, the Article XIV section 4 of the California Constitution, sets forth the intent of the people to establish a system of workers' compensation.

=== Texas ===
Texas is unusual in that it allows employers to opt out of the workers' compensation system, with those employers who do not purchase workers' compensation insurance being called non-subscribers. However, those employers are exposed to legal liability in the event of employee injury. The employee must demonstrate that employer negligence caused the injury; if the employer does not subscribe to workers' compensation, the employer loses their common law defense of contributory negligence, assumption of the risk, and the fellow employee doctrine. If successful, the employee can recover their full common law damages, which are more generous than workers' compensation benefits.

In 1995, 44% of Texas employers were non-subscribers, while in 2001 the percentage was estimated to be 35%. The industry advocacy group Texas Association of Business Nonsubscription claims that non-subscribing employers have had greater satisfaction ratings and reduced expenses when compared to employers enrolled in the workers' compensation system. A research survey by Texas's Research and Oversight Council on Workers' Compensation found that 68% of non-subscribing employers and 60% of subscribing employers—a majority in both cases—were satisfied with their experiences in the system, and that satisfaction with non-subscription increased with the size of the firm; but it stated that further research was needed to gauge satisfaction among employees and to determine the adequacy of compensation under non-subscription compared to subscription. In recent years, the Texas Supreme Court has been limiting employer duties to maintain employee safety, limiting the remedies received by injured workers.

== Privatization ==
In recent years, workers' compensation programs in West Virginia and Nevada were privatised, through mutualisation, in part to resolve situations in which the programs in those states had significantly underfunded their liabilities. Only four states rely on entirely state-run programs for workers' compensation: North Dakota, Ohio, Washington, and Wyoming. These four states are referred to as monopolistic states as they require their employers to purchase workers compensation from a government-operated fund. Many other states maintain state-run funds but also allow private insurance companies to insure employers and their employees, as well.

== Federal laws ==
The federal government has its own workers' compensation program, subject to its own requirements and statutory parameters for federal employees. The federal government pays its workers' compensation obligations for its own employees through regular appropriations.

== Alternate statutory compensation ==
Employees of common carriers by rail have a statutory remedy under the Federal Employers' Liability Act (FELA), 45 U.S.C. sec. 51, which provides that a carrier "shall be liable" to an employee who is injured by the negligence of the employer. To enforce his compensation rights, the employee may file suit in United States district court or in a state court. The FELA remedy is based on tort principles of ordinary negligence and differs significantly from most state workers' compensation benefit schedules.

Seafarers employed on United States vessels who are injured because of the owner's or the operator's negligence can sue their employers under the Jones Act, 46 U.S.C. App. 688., essentially a remedy very similar to the FELA one.

Dock workers and other maritime workers, who are not seafarers working aboard navigating vessels, are covered by the Federal Longshore and Harbor Workers' Compensation Act, known as US L&H.

== Workers' compensation fraud ==
Workers' compensation fraud can be committed by doctors, lawyers, employers, insurance company employees and claimants, and may occur in both the private and public sectors.

The topic of workers' compensation fraud is highly controversial, with claimant supporters arguing that fraud by claimants is rare—as low as one-third of one percent, others focusing on the widely reported National Insurance Crime Bureau statistic that workers' compensation fraud accounts for $7.2 billion in unnecessary costs, and government entities acknowledging that "there is no generally accepted method or standard for measuring the extent of workers' compensation fraud ... as a consequence, there are widely divergent opinions about the size of the problem and the relative importance of the issue."

According to the Coalition Against Insurance Fraud, tens of billions of dollars in false claims and unpaid premiums are stolen in the U.S. alone every year.

The most common forms of workers' compensation fraud by workers are:

1. Remote injury. Workers get injured away from work, but say they were hurt on the job so that their workers' compensation policy will cover the medical bills.
2. Inflating injuries. A worker has a fairly minor job injury, but lies about the magnitude of the injury in order to collect more workers' compensation money and stay away from work longer.
3. Faking injuries. Workers fabricate an injury that never took place, and claim it for workers' compensation benefits.
4. Old injury. A worker with an old injury that never quite healed claims it as a recent work injury in order to get medical care covered.
5. Malingering. A worker stays home by pretending the disability is ongoing when it is actually healed.
6. Failure to Disclose. A worker knowingly, or unknowingly, makes a false statement or representation about their injury.

The most common forms of workers' compensation fraud by employers are:

1. Underreporting payroll. An employer reports that workers are paid less than they actually are in order to lower their premiums.
2. Inflating experience. An employer claims workers are more experienced than they actually are in order to make them seem less risky and therefore less expensive to cover.
3. Evasion. An employer fails to obtain workers' compensation for their employees when it is required by law. Workers are often deceived into thinking they are covered when they are not.
4. Through the introduction of "opt-out plans" that are governed by the federal Employee Retirement Income Security Act, or ERISA, which is regulated by the Labor Department. The "opt-out plans" provide lower and fewer payments, make it more difficult to qualify for benefits, control access to doctors and limit independent appeals of benefits decisions.

== See also ==
- Marie Moentmann (1900-1974), child survivor of industrial accident
- Scaffold Law (New York)

== Works cited ==
- Witt, John Fabian (2004). The Accidental Republic: Crippled Workingmen, Destitute Widows, and the Remaking of American Law. Cambridge, Massachusetts: Harvard University Press. ISBN 9780674045279.
