= Willard Bartlett =

American judge

Willard Bartlet
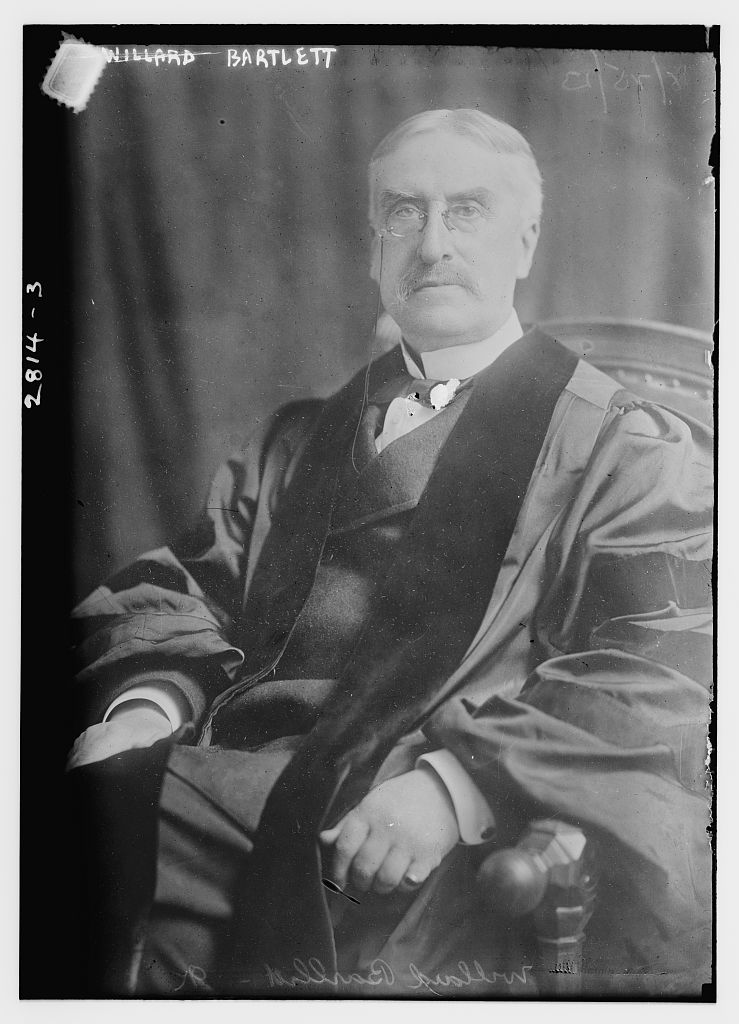
- Willard Bartlett, c. 1913

Associate Judge of the New York Court of Appeals
- In office 1906–1914

Justice of the New York Supreme Court
- In office 1884–1906

Personal details
- Born: October 14, 1846 Uxbridge, Massachusetts
- Died: January 17, 1925 (aged 78) Brooklyn, New York
- Resting place: Green-Wood Cemetery
- Relatives: Franklin Bartlett (brother)
- Education: Columbia College (BA); New York University (LLB)

Willard Bartlett (October 14, 1846 – January 17, 1925) was an American jurist who served on the New York Court of Appeals from 1908 to 1916, elected as its Chief Judge from 1914 to 1916.

== Biography ==
Bartlett was born in Uxbridge, Massachusetts, the son of William Osborne Bartlett and Agnes E. H. Willard. His brother was Congressman Franklin Bartlett. He attended Columbia College, graduating with a B.A. While there, he was a member of the Fraternity of Delta Psi (aka St. Anthony Hall) and the Philolexian Society. He then received a LL.B. from New York University in 1868. He practiced law in partnership with Elihu Root from 1869 until his election to the bench.

On October 26, 1870, he married Mary Fairbanks Buffum. From 1871 to 1873, he was a drama critic for the old New York Sun, and later wrote editorials on legal topics and book reviews for this paper.

He was a justice of the New York Supreme Court (2nd D.) from 1884 to 1907. From 1887 on, he sat on the General Term (First Dept.) and, after the re-organization of the court system by the State Constitution of 1894, on the Appellate Division, 2nd Dept. from 1896 to 1906. In January 1906, he was designated to the Court of Appeals under the Amendment of 1899.

In November 1907, he was elected on the Republican and Democratic tickets to a 14-year term as judge of the New York Court of Appeals, and was Chief Judge from 1914 to 1916, elected in November 1913 on the Democratic ticket. He retired from the bench when he reached the constitutional age limit of 70 years, and resumed his law practice with Elihu Root. He was elected a Fellow of the American Academy of Arts and Sciences in 1918.

Bartlett died in Brooklyn, New York aged 78. He was buried at the Green-Wood Cemetery, Brooklyn.

Legal offices
Preceded by Edgar M. Cullen	Chief Judge of the New York Court of Appeals; 1914–1916	Succeeded by Frank H. Hiscock
