= Edward T. Bartlett =

American judge

Edward Theodore Bartlett
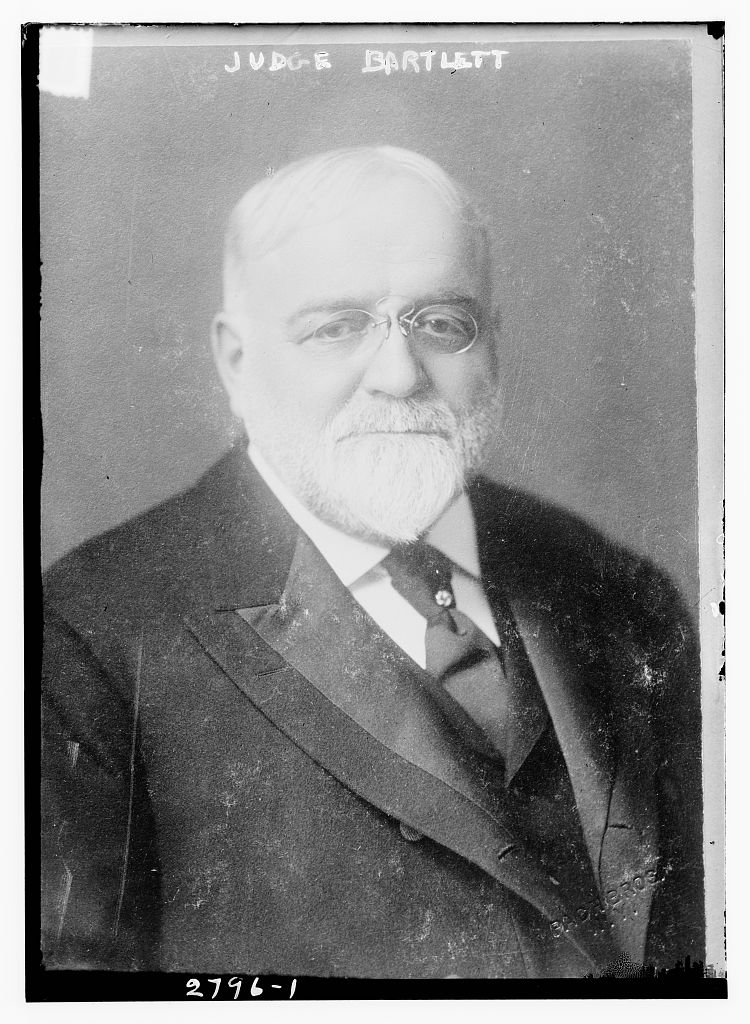
- Bartlett circa 1910
- Born: June 14, 1841; Skaneateles, New York, US
- Died: May 3, 1910 (aged 68); Albany Hospital; Albany, New York, US

Edward Theodore Bartlett (June 14, 1841 – May 3, 1910) was an American lawyer and politician from New York.

== Biography ==
He was born on June 14, 1841, in Skaneateles, New York to Levi Bartlett. His father moved in 1831 from Haverhill, New Hampshire, to Skaneateles, New York, and practiced medicine there.

He was admitted to the New York Bar Association in 1862, and practiced law in Syracuse, New York. He moved to New York City in 1868.

In 1891, he ran for the New York Supreme Court but was defeated. In 1893, he was elected on the Republican ticket to the New York Court of Appeals. He was re-elected in 1907, and died in office.

He died of heart disease at the Albany Hospital in Albany, New York on May 3, 1910.
