= Frank H. Hiscock =

American judge (1856–1946)

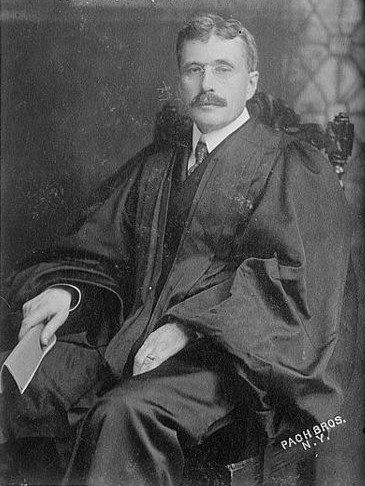
- Justice Frank H. Hiscock

Chief Judge of the New York Court of Appeals
- In office 1917–1926
- Preceded by: Willard Bartlett
- Succeeded by: Benjamin N. Cardozo

Justice of the New York Supreme Court
- In office 1896–1913

Personal details
- Born: April 16, 1856 Tully, New York, US
- Died: July 2, 1946 (aged 90) Syracuse, New York, US
- Spouse: Mary Elizabeth Barnes Hiscock
- Relations: Frank Hiscock (uncle)
- Education: Cornell University

Frank Harris Hiscock (April 16, 1856 – July 2, 1946) was an American lawyer and politician from New York. He was Chief Judge of the New York Court of Appeals from 1917 to 1926.

== Biography ==
He was born in 1856 to L. Harris Hiscock, a lawyer and New York State Assembly member who founded the Hiscock & Barclay law firm in Syracuse, New York, and who was murdered on June 4, 1867, by General George W. Cole, a brother of Cornelius Cole. After his father's death, he was raised by his uncle, Frank Hiscock.

Hiscock graduated B.A. from Cornell University in 1875, where he was a member of Kappa Alpha Society. He studied at Columbia Law School in 1877 and 1878 and became an attorney in 1878.

He was a justice of the New York Supreme Court from 1896 to 1913, on the Appellate Division, Fourth Department from 1901 to 1905.

In 1906 Hiscock was appointed to an additional judge seat on the New York Court of Appeals under the Amendment of 1899. In 1912 he ran on the Republican ticket for a regular seat, but was defeated. In 1913 he ran again and was elected on the Republican and Independence League tickets to a 14-year term. He was Chief Judge from 1917 to 1926, elected in 1916 on the Republican and Progressive tickets. He retired from the bench at the end of 1926 when he reached the constitutional age limit of 70 years. Afterwards he served as Official Referee of the Court of Appeals, and resumed his law practice at Hiscock & Barclay until his retirement in 1935.

Hiscock was first elected to the Cornell Board of Trustees by the alumni in 1889. He had the longest tenure as chairman, serving from 1917 to 1939. During that period, Cornell's endowment grew from $14 million to $32 million.

Hiscock received honorary degrees from Williams College, Syracuse University, Columbia University and the University of the State of New York.

His wife Mary Elizabeth Barnes Hiscock died in 1937 at age 80. They had two sons and a daughter. He retired from the Cornell Board of Trustees on May 5, 1946. He died in Syracuse on July 2, 1946, and was buried at Oakwood Cemetery.

== Legacy ==
Hiscock left his house to charity and the resulting income presently funds the Frank H. Hiscock Legal Aid Society, which provides legal assistance to indigent residents of Onondaga County.

Legal offices
Preceded by Willard Bartlett	Chief Judge of the New York Court of Appeals; 1917–1926	Succeeded by Benjamin N. Cardozo
Academic offices
Preceded by Roswell P. Flower	Chairman of Cornell Board of Trustees; 1917–1939	Succeeded by J. DuPratt White
