= Substantial performance =

At common law, substantial performance is an alternative principle to the perfect tender rule. It allows a court to imply a term that allows a partial or substantially similar performance to stand in for the performance specified in the contract.

This principle is relevant when a contractor's performance is in some way deficient, through no willful act by the contractor, yet is so nearly equivalent that it would be unreasonable for the owner to deny the agreed upon payment. If a contractor successfully demonstrates substantial performance, the owner remains obligated to fulfill payment, less any damages suffered as a result of the deficiencies in workmanship by the contractor.

The principle is also found in the law of unilateral contracts. Unilateral contracts are contracts in which one party offers a promise in exchange for an actual performance. Traditionally, such contracts were deemed to be effective once the specified performance was tendered, and could be revoked at any time prior to completion of the performance, presenting the notorious "Cedric Brooklyn Bridge problem": in theory, A could say to B "I'll give you $100 if you walk across the Brooklyn Bridge", and then, just before B finishes crossing, pull up to him in a car and say "The deal is off," at which point no contract would be formed and A would not be liable to B for anything. This result was deemed unacceptable by many jurists and legal scholars, and applied the doctrine of substantial performance to this situation, effectively deeming someone who had begun the performance to have established an option contract to hold the unilateral contract open. This principle is enunciated in Section 237 of the Restatement (Second) of Contracts.

== Notable cases ==
- Cutter v Powell (1795) 101 ER 573
- Sumpter v Hedges [1898] 1 QB 673
- Jacob & Youngs v. Kent 230 N.Y. 239 (1921) — The New York Court of Appeals ruled that a contracted homebuilder was entitled to full payment without tearing down and rebuilding the residence, simply because within it he had installed piping equal to, though a different brand name than, that which had been agreed upon in the contract.
- Hoenig v Isaacs [1952] EWCA Civ 6, 2 All ER 176
- Bolton v Mahadeva [1972] 2 All ER 1322
- Miles v Wakefield Borough Council [1987] AC 539, Lord Bridge and Lord Brightman reincarnating the doctrine in Cutter v Powell to use against a council registrar who refused to work 3 out of 37 hours, as part of industrial action. They advised the employer that they needed to pay nothing.
- Wilusynski v London Borough of Tower Hamlets [1989] ICR 493, Nicholls LJ holding no "substantial performance" by - and no pay whatsoever for - a council worker on industrial action who did everything but answer enquiries from councillors.
- Petterson v. Pattberg, 1928 New York Court of Appeals case

== See also ==
- Contract law
- Force majeure
- Hardship clause
- Hell or high water clause
- Impossibility of performance
- Mutual assent
