= Cutter v Powell =

English contract law case

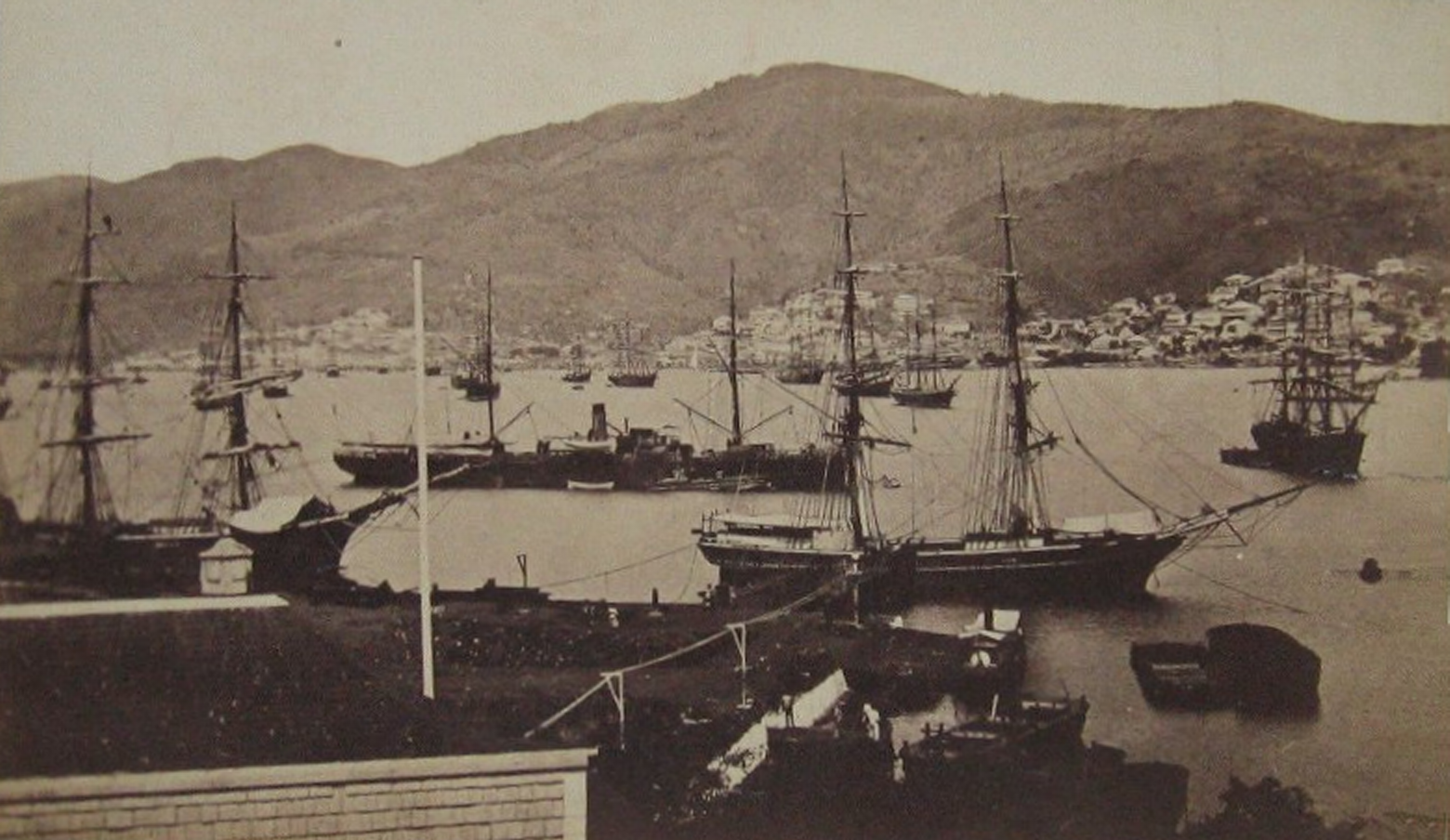
- Court: Court of King's Bench
- Decided: 9 June 1795
- Citation: (1795) 6 TR 320; 101 ER 573

Case opinions
- Lord Kenyon CJ, Ashhurst J, Grose J, Lawrence J

Cutter v Powell (1795) 101 ER 573 is an English contract law case, concerning substantial performance of a contract.

== Facts ==
Cutter agreed he would sail with Powell from Kingston, Jamaica to Liverpool, England. The contractual note read as follows.

“Ten days after the ship Governor Parry, myself master, arrives at Liverpool, I promise to pay to Mr. T. Cutter the sum of thirty guineas, provided he proceeds, continues and does his duty as second mate in the said ship from hence to the port of Liverpool. Kingston, July 31st, 1793.”

Cutter died after seven weeks. It was a ten-week voyage. The ship left on 2 August, Cutter died on 20 September and the ship arrived on 9 October. The ship captain refused to pay any wages at all. Mrs Cutter sued to recover the wages for the part of the journey that the husband had survived.

It was apparent that the usual wages of a second mate of a ship on such a voyage was four pounds per month: but when seamen are shipped by the run from Jamaica to England, a gross sum was usually given. The usual length of a voyage from Jamaica to Liverpool was about eight weeks.

=== Submissions ===
The arguments for the plaintiff, Mrs Cutter, went as follows.

The plaintiff is entitled to recover a proportionable part of the wages on a quantum meruit for work and labour done by the intestate during that part of the voyage that he lived and served the defendant; as in the ordinary case of a contract of hiring for a year, if the servant die during the year, his representatives are entitled to a proportionable part of his wages. If any defence can be set up against the present claim, it must arise either from some known general rule of law respecting marine service, or from the particular terms of the contract between these parties. But there is no such rule applicable to marine service in general as will prevent the plaintiff's recovering, neither will it be found, on consideration, that there is any thing in the terms of this contract to defeat the present claim. It is indeed a general rule that freight is the mother of wages; and therefore if the voyage be not performed, and the owners receive no freight, the sailors lose their wages; though that has some exceptions where the voyage is lost by the fault of the owners, as if the ship be seized for a debt of the owners, or on account of having contraband goods on board; in either of which cases the sailors are entitled to their wages though the voyage be not performed. Vin. Abr. “Mariners,” 235. But here the rule itself does not apply, the voyage having been performed, and the owners having earned their freight. There is also another general rule, that if a sailor desert, he shall lose his wages: but that is founded upon public policy, and was introduced as a mean of preserving the ship. But that rule cannot apply to this case; for there the sailor forfeits his wages by his own wrongful act, whereas here the canon was prevented completing his contract by the act of God.

So if a mariner be impressed, he does not forfeit his wages; for in Wiggins v Ingleton Lord Holt held that a seaman, who was impressed before the ship returned to the port of delivery, might recover wages pro tanto. Neither is there any thing in the terms of this contract to prevent the plaintiff's recovering on a quantum meruit. The note is a security, and not an agreement; it is in the form of a promissory note, and was given by the master of the ship to the intestate to secure the payment of a gross sum of money, on condition that the intestate should be able to, and should actually, perform a given duty. The condition was inserted to prevent the desertion of the intestate, and to ensure his good conduct during the voyage. And in cases of this kind, the contract is to be construed liberally.

In Edwards v Child, where the mariners had given bonds to the East India Company not to demand their wages unless the ship returned to the port of London, it was held that as the ship had sailed to India and had there delivered her outward bound cargo, the mariners were entitled to their wages on the outward bound voyage, though the ship was taken on her return to England. This note cannot be construed literally, for then the intestate would not have been entitled to any thing though he had lived and continued on board during the whole voyage, if he had been disabled by sickness from performing his duty. But even if this is to be considered as a contract between the parties, and the words of it are to be construed strictly, still the plaintiff is entitled to recover on a quantum meruit, because that contract does not apply to this case. The note was given for a specific sum to be paid in a given event; but that event has not happened, and the action is not brought on the note. The parties provided for one particular case: but there was no express contract for the case that has happened; and therefore the plaintiff may resort to an undertaking which the law implies, on a quantum meruit for work and labour done by the intestate. For though, as the condition in the note, which may be taken to be a condition precedent, was not complied with, the plaintiff cannot recover the sum which was to have been paid if the condition had been performed by the intestate, there is no reason why the representative of the seaman, who performed certain services for the defendant, should not recover something for the work and labour of the intestate in a case to which the express contract does not apply.

Arguments on behalf of the defendant.

Nothing can be more clearly established than that where there is an express contract between the parties, they cannot resort to an implied one. It is only because the parties have not expressed what their agreement was that the law implies what they would have agreed to do had they entered into a precise treaty: but when once they have expressed what their agreement was, the law will not imply any agreement at all. In this case the intestate and the defendant reduced their agreement into writing, by the terms of which they must now be bound: this is an entire and indivisible contract; the defendant engaged to pay a certain sum of money, provided the intestate continued to perform his duty during the whole voyage; that proviso is a condition precedent to the intestate or his representative claiming the money from the defendant, and that condition not having been performed, the plaintiff cannot now recover any thing. If the parties had entered into no agreement and the intestate had chosen to trust to the wages that he would have earned and might have recovered on a quantum meruit, he would only have been entitled to 8l.; instead of which he expressly stipulated that he should receive thirty guineas if he continued to perform his duty for the whole voyage. He preferred taking the chance of earning a large sum in the event of his continuing on board during the whole voyage to receiving a certain, but smaller, rate of wages for the time he should actually serve on board; and having made that election, his representative must be bound by it.

In the common case of service, if a servant who is hired for a year die in the middle of it, his executor may recover part of his wages in proportion to the time of service: but if the servant agreed to receive a larger sum than the ordinary rate of wages on the express condition of his serving the whole year, his executor would not be entitled to any part of such wages in the event of the servant dying before the expiration of the year. The title to marine wages by no means depends on the owners being entitled to freight; for if the sailors desert, or do not perform their duty, they are not entitled to wages though the owner earn the freight. Nor is it conclusive against the defendant that the intestate was prevented fulfilling his contract by the act of God; for the same reason would apply to the loss of a ship, which may equally happen by the act of God, and without any default in the sailors; and yet in that case the sailors lose their wages. But there are other cases that bear equally hard upon contracting parties; and in which an innocent person must suffer if the terms of his contract require it; e.g. the tenant of a house who covenants to pay rent and who is bound to continue paying the rent, though the house be burned down.

Lord Kenyon Ch.J
But that must be taken with some qualification; for where an action was brought for rent after the house was burned down, and the tenant applied to the Court of Chancery for an injunction, Lord C. Northington said that if the tenant would give up his lease, he should not be bound to pay the rent.

With regard to the case cited from 2 Lord Raym.; the case of a mariner impressed is an excepted case, and the reason of that decision was founded on principles of public policy.

== Judgment ==
The Court of King's Bench held that Cutter was not entitled to wages because he had not completed the journey. Part performance was no performance at all. Lord Kenyon CJ led with his judgment.

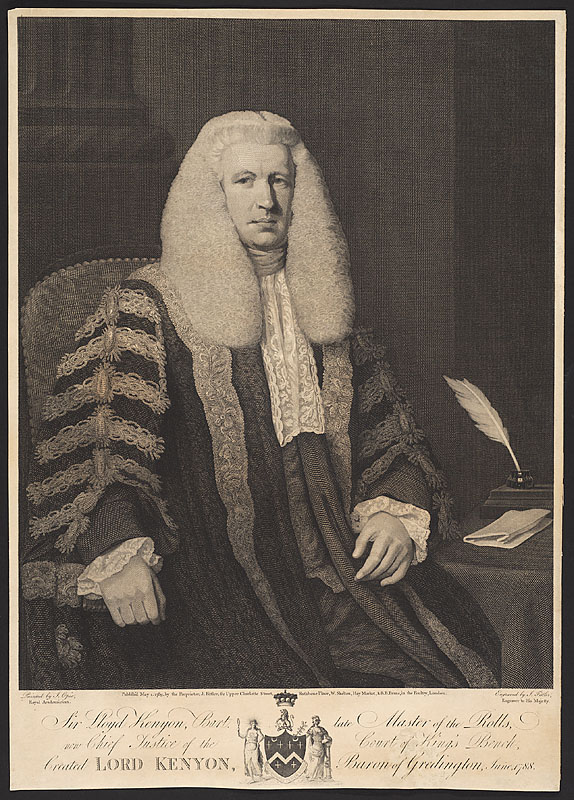
The 1st Lord Kenyon.

I should be extremely sorry that in the decision of this case we should determine against what had been the received opinion in the mercantile world on contracts of this kind, because it is of great importance that the laws by which the contracts of so numerous and so useful a body of men as the sailors are supposed to be guided should not be overturned. Whether these kind of notes are much in use among the seamen, we are not sufficiently informed; and the instances now stated to us from Liverpool are too recent to form any thing like usage. But it seems to me at present that the decision of this case may proceed on the particular words of this contract and the precise facts here stated, without touching marine contracts in general. That where the parties have come to an express contract none can be implied has prevailed so long as to be reduced to an axiom in the law. Here the defendant expressly promised to pay the intestate thirty guineas, provided he proceeded, continued and did his duty as second mate in the ship from Jamaica to Liverpool; and the accompanying circumstances disclosed in the case are that the common rate of wages is four pounds per month, when the party is paid in proportion to the time he serves: and that this voyage is generally performed in two months. Therefore if there had been no contract between these parties, all that the intestate could have recovered on a quantum meruit for the voyage would have been eight pounds; whereas here the defendant contracted to pay thirty guineas provided the mate continued to do his duty as mate during the whole voyage, in which case the latter would have received nearly four times as much as if he were paid for the number of months he served. He stipulated to receive the larger sum if the whole duty were performed, and nothing unless the whole of that duty were performed: it was a kind of insurance. On this particular contract my opinion is formed at present; at the same time I must say that if we were assured that these notes are in universal use, and that the commercial world have received and acted upon them in a different sense, I should give up my own opinion.

Ashhurst J concurred, emphasising that the contract was entire and that completion was a condition precedent to the obligation to pay.

We cannot collect that there is any custom prevailing among merchants on these contracts; and therefore we have nothing to guide us but the terms of the contract itself. This is a written contract, and it speaks for itself. And as it is entire, and as the defendant's promise depends on a condition precedent to be performed by the other party, the condition must be performed before the other party is entitled to receive any thing under it. It has been argued however that the plaintiff may now recover on a quantum meruit: but she has no right to desert the agreement; for wherever there is an express contract the parties must be guided by it; and one party cannot relinquish or abide by it as it may suit his advantage. Here the intestate was by the terms of his contract to perform a given duty before he could call upon the defendant to pay him any thing; it was a condition precedent, without performing which the defendant is not liable. And that seems to me to conclude the question: the intestate did not perform the contract on his part; he was not indeed to blame for not doing it; but still as this was a condition precedent, and as he did not perform it, his representative is not entitled to recover.

Grose J concurred.

In this case the plaintiff must either recover on the particular stipulation between the parties, or on some general known rule of law, the latter of which has not been much relied on. I have looked into the laws of Oleron; and I have seen a late case on this subject in the Court of Common Pleas, Chandler v Greaves. I have also inquired into the practice of the merchants in the city, and have been informed that these contracts are not considered as divisible, and that the seaman must perform the voyage, otherwise he is not entitled to his wages; though I must add that the result of my inquiries has not been perfectly satisfactory, and therefore I do not rely upon it. The laws of Oleron are extremely favourable to the seamen; so much so that if a sailor, who has agreed for a voyage, be taken ill and put on shore before the voyage is completed, he is nevertheless entitled to his whole wages after deducting what has been laid out for him. In the case of Chandler v Greaves, where the jury gave a verdict for the whole wages to the plaintiff who was put on shore on account of a broken leg, the Court refused to grant a new trial, though I do not know the precise grounds on which the Court proceeded. However in this case the agreement is conclusive; the defendant only engaged to pay the intestate on condition of his continuing to do his duty on board during the whole voyage; and the latter was to be entitled either to thirty guineas or to nothing, for such was the contract between the parties. And when we recollect how large a price was to be given in the event of the mate continuing on board during the whole voyage instead of the small sum which is usually given per month, it may fairly be considered that the parties themselves understood that if the whole duty were performed, the mate was to receive the whole sum, and that he was not to receive any thing unless he did continue on board during the whole voyage. That seems to me to be the situation in which the mate chose to put himself; and as the condition was not complied with, his representative cannot now recover any thing. I believe however that in point of fact these notes are in common use, and perhaps it may be prudent not to determine this case until we have inquired whether or not there has been any decision upon them.

Lawrence J concurred.

If we are to determine this case according to the terms of the instrument alone the plaintiff is not entitled to recover, because it is an entire contract. In Salk. 65 there is a strong case to that effect; there debt was brought upon a writing, by which the defendant's testator had appointed the plaintiff's testator to receive his rents and promised to pay him 100l. per annum for his service; the plaintiff shewed that the defendant's testator died three quarters of a year after, during which time he served him, and he demanded 75l. for three quarters; after judgment for the plaintiff in the Common Pleas, the defendant brought a writ of error, and it was argued that without a full year's service nothing could be due, for that it was in nature of a condition precedent; that it being one consideration and one debt it could not be divided; and this Court were of that opinion; and reversed the judgment. With regard to the common case of an hired servant, to which this has been compared; such a servant, though hired in a general way, is considered to be hired with reference to the general understanding upon the subject, that the servant shall be entitled to his wages for the time he serves though he do not continue in the service during the whole year. So if the plaintiff in this case could have proved any usage that persons in the situation of this mate are entitled to wages in proportion to the time they served, the plaintiff might have recovered according to that usage. But if this is to depend altogether on the terms of the contract itself, she cannot recover any thing. As to the case of the impressed man, perhaps it is an excepted case; and I believe that in such cases the King's officers usually put another person on board to supply the place of the impressed man during the voyage, so that the service is still performed for the benefit of the owner of the ship.

== See also ==
- Sumpter v Hedges [1898] 1 QB 673
- Britton v. Turner, 6 N.H. 481 (1834) an employee who left work on a farm after six months, but had contracted to be paid $120 at the end of one year, was entitled to receive some payment ($95) even though the contract was not completed.
- Jacob & Youngs v. Kent, 230 N.Y. 239 (1921) a NY Court of Appeal case by Cardozo J.
- Hoenig v Isaacs [1952] EWCA Civ 6, 2 All ER 176
- Bolton v Mahadeva [1972] 2 All ER 1322
- Wilusynski v London Borough of Tower Hamlets [1989] ICR 493, Nicholls LJ holding no "substantial performance" by - and no pay whatsoever for - a council worker on industrial action who did everything but answer enquiries from councillors.
