= Act of nature =

Act of nature may refer to:

- Natural disaster
- Act of God, in legal usage
