= Eid al-Adha =

Islamic and Druze holiday

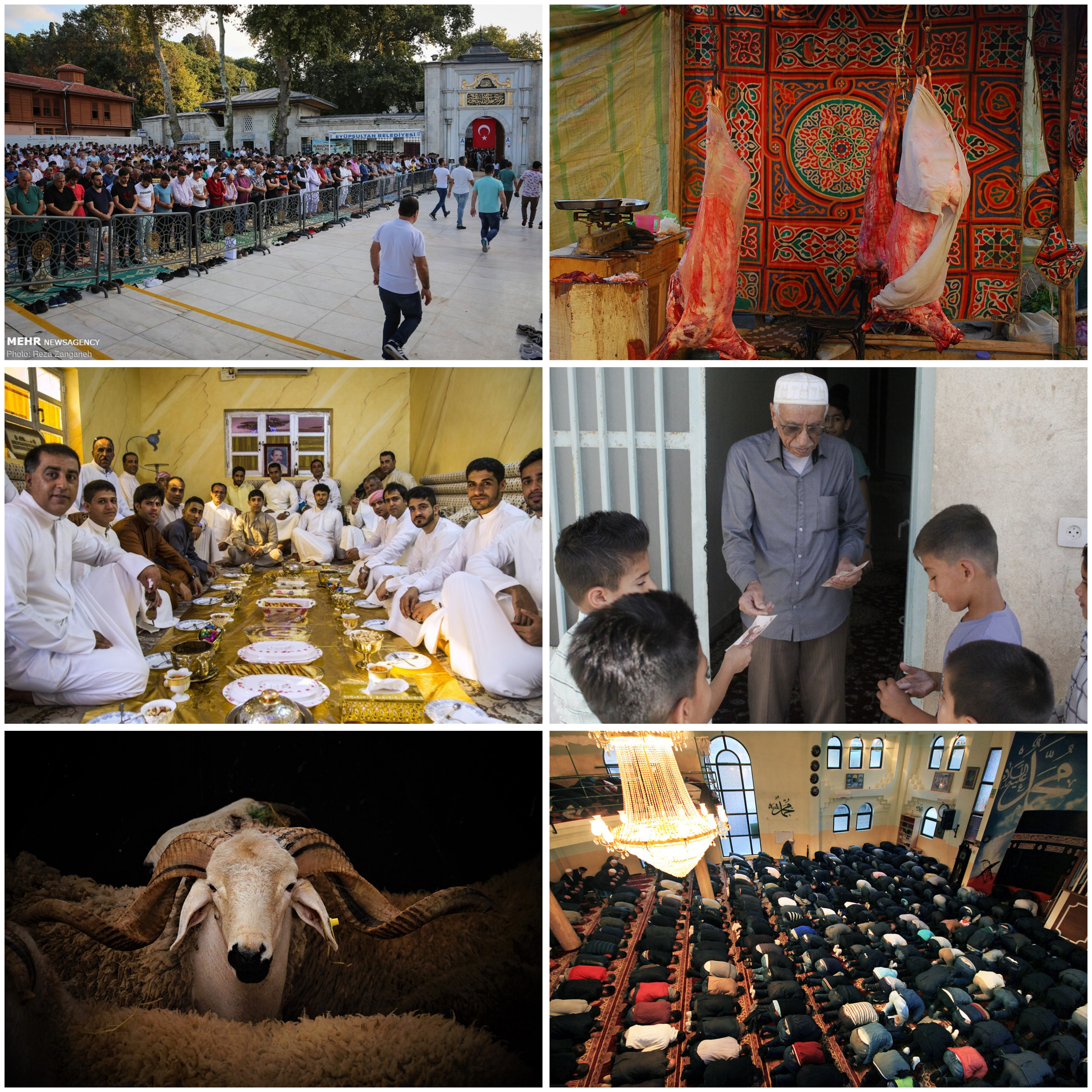
- Clockwise from top: Bayram Namazı in Istanbul; Qurbani on Egyptian market; Muslim children receiving Eidi; Eid prayer in Albania; Moroccan sheep prepared for sacrifice; Feast in Ahvaz, Iran
- Also called: The Major Festival
- Observed by: Muslims and Druzes
- Type: Islamic
- Significance: Commemoration of Abraham's willingness to sacrifice his son in obedience to God's command; End of the annual Hajj in Mecca for pilgrims
- Celebrations: Eid prayers, sacrificing animals, gift-giving (Eidi), festive meals, family and social gatherings, symbolic decoration, charity
- Date: 10–13 Dhu'l-Hijja
- 2025 date: 6 June – 9 June (West Asia, Europe, North America); 7 June – 10 June (North Africa, South Asia and Southeast Asia)
- 2026 date: 27 May – 30 May (Americas, Europe, West/South Asia, North Africa) 28 May – 31 May (South Africa, East Asia, Oceania/Australia)
- Duration: 4 days
- Related to: Hajj, Eid al-Fitr

Eid al-Adha (Note: /ˌiːd əl ˈɑːdə, - ˈɑːdhɑː/ EED əl AH-də, - AHD-hah; Arabic: عيد الأضحى, romanized: ʿĪd al-ʾAḍḥā, IPA: [ʕiːd al ˈʔadˤħaː].) (Arabic: عيد الأضحى, romanized: ʿĪd al-ʾAḍḥā, lit. 'Feast of the Sacrifice') is the second of the two main festivals in Islam (alongside Eid al-Fitr) and Druze. It falls on the 10th of Dhu'l-Hijja, the twelfth and final month of the Islamic calendar. Celebrations and observances are generally carried forward to the three following days, known as the Tashreeq days.

Eid al-Adha, depending on country and language is also called the Greater or Large Eid (Arabic: العيد الكبير, romanized: al-ʿĪd al-Kabīr). As with Eid al-Fitr, the Eid prayer is performed on the morning of Eid al-Adha, after which the udhiyah or the ritual sacrifice of a livestock animal, is performed. In Islamic tradition, it honours the willingness of Abraham to sacrifice his son as an act of obedience to God's command. Depending on the narrative, either Ishmael or Isaac are referred to with the honorific title "Sacrifice of God". Pilgrims performing the Hajj typically perform the tawaf and saee of Hajj on Eid al-Adha, along with the ritual stoning of the Devil on the Eid day and the following days.

== Etymology ==
The Arabic word عيد (ʿīd) means 'festival', 'celebration', 'feast day', or 'holiday'. The word عيد is a triliteral root (ʕ-y-d), with associated root meanings of "to go back, to rescind, to accrue, to be accustomed, habits, to repeat, to be experienced; appointed time or place, anniversary, feast day". Arthur Jeffery contested this etymology, and believed the term to have been borrowed into Arabic from Syriac, or less likely Targumic Aramaic.

The holiday is called عيد الأضحى (Eid-al-Adha) or العيد الكبير (Eid-al-Kabir) in Arabic. The words أضحى (aḍḥā) and قربان (qurbān) are synonymous in meaning 'sacrifice' (animal sacrifice), 'offering' or 'oblation'. The first word comes from the triliteral root ضحى (ḍaḥḥā) with the associated meanings "immolate; offer up; sacrifice; victimize". No occurrence of this root with a meaning related to sacrifice occurs in the Qur'an but in the Hadith literature. Assyrians and other Middle Eastern Christians use the term to mean the Eucharistic host. The second word derives from the triliteral root قرب (qaraba) with associated meanings of "closeness, proximity... to moderate; kinship...; to hurry; ...to seek, to seek water sources...; scabbard, sheath; small boat; sacrifice". Arthur Jeffery recognizes the same Semitic root, but believes the sense of the term to have entered Arabic through Aramaic.

Eid al-Adha is pronounced Eid al-Azha and Eidul Azha, primarily in Iran and influenced by the Persian language, in the Indian subcontinent. In Turkish-speaking countries, it is called Kurban Bayramı.

== Origin ==
According to Islamic tradition, one of the main trials of Abraham's life was to receive and obey the command of God to sacrifice his eldest son, Ishmael. (Abraham and Ishmael are known as Ibrahim and Isma'il in Arabic). Muslims overwhelmingly reject the Biblical claim that Isaaq, Abraham's second son, was supposed to have been the designated victim. According to the Qur'an, Abraham kept having dreams in which he killed his son. He interpreted this as a command from God. The prophet told his son,

“O my dear son! I have seen in a dream that I ˹must˺ sacrifice you. So tell me what you think.” He replied, “O my dear father! Do as you are commanded. Allah willing, you will find me steadfast.”

— Surah As-Saaffat 37:102

Abraham prepared to submit to the will of God and to slaughter his son as an act of faith and obedience to God. During the preparation, Satan tried to dissuade Abraham and his family from carrying out God's commandment, so Abraham drove Satan away by throwing pebbles at him. In commemoration of their rejection of the devil, pilgrims to Mecca throw stones at pillars that mark the place where Satan tried to tempt Abraham.

Acknowledging that Abraham was willing to sacrifice what was dear to him, God honoured both Abraham and his son. The Angel Gabriel (Jibreel) proclaimed, "O Ibrahim, you have fulfilled the revelations," and a ram from heaven was offered by Angel Gabriel to prophet Abraham to slaughter instead of his son. When Muslims celebrate Eid al-Adha they commemorate both Abraham's willingness to afflict his family and his son Ishmael's willingness to die for God.

This story is known as the Akedah in Judaism (Binding of Isaac) and originates in the Torah, in the first book of Moses (Genesis, Ch. 22). The Akedah is referred to in the Quran in its 37th surah, As-Saaffat.

The word "Eid" appears once in Al-Ma'ida, the fifth surah of the Quran, with the meaning "a festival or a feast".

== Observances ==
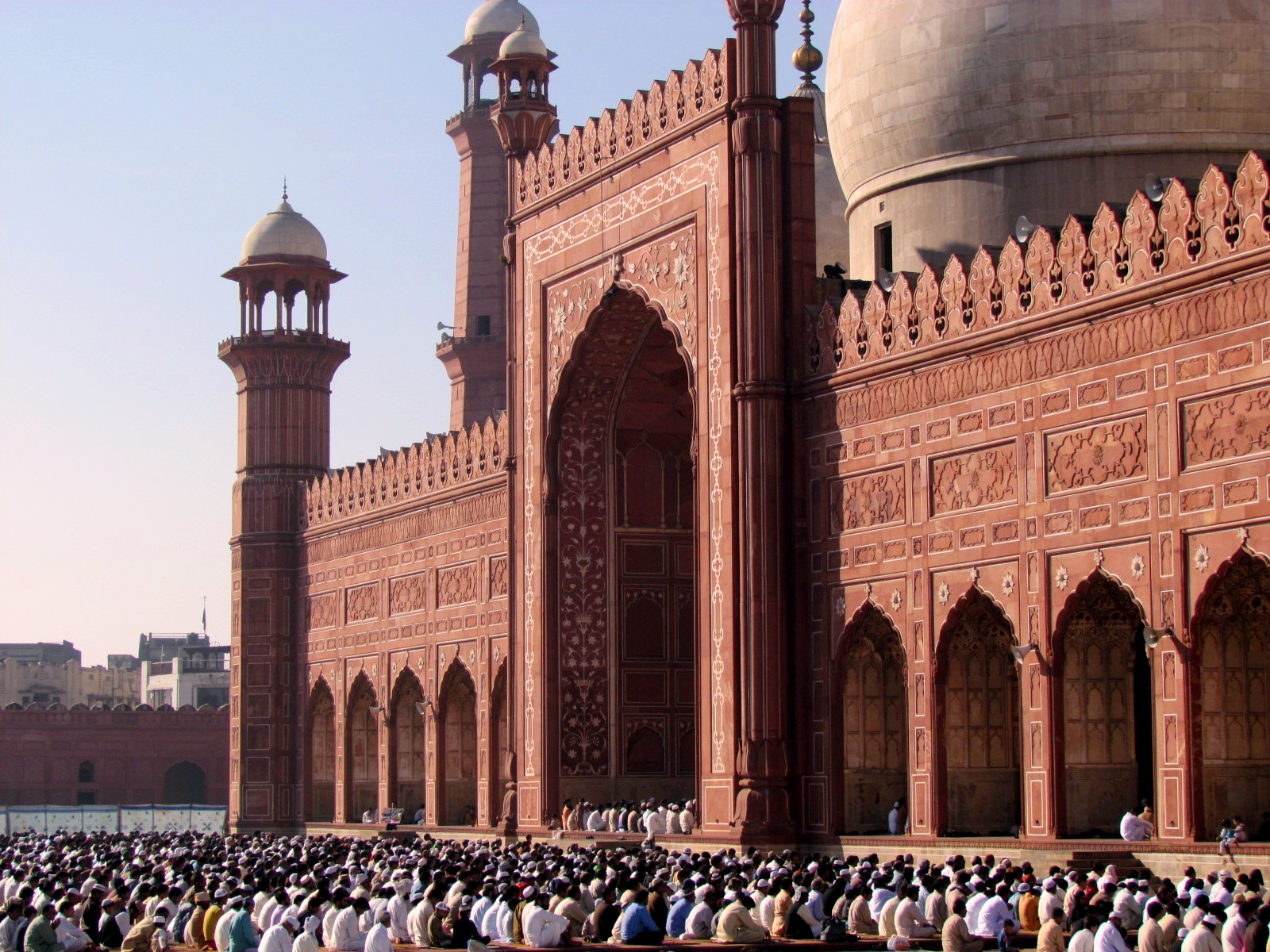
Eid prayer at the Badshahi Mosque in Lahore, Pakistan

When preceding Eid al-Adha and during the Eid and Tashreeq days, Muslims recite the takbir. Like on Eid al-Fitr, the Eid prayer is performed on Eid al-Adha any time after sunrise and before the Zuhr prayer. In the event of a force majeure, the prayer may be delayed to the day after or the second day after Eid. The Eid prayer is followed by a khutbah (sermon). At the conclusion of the prayers and sermon, Muslims embrace and exchange gifts and greetings with one another, such as the phrase Eid Mubarak. Many Muslims also take this opportunity to invite their friends, neighbours and colleagues to the festivities to better acquaint them about Islam and Muslim culture.

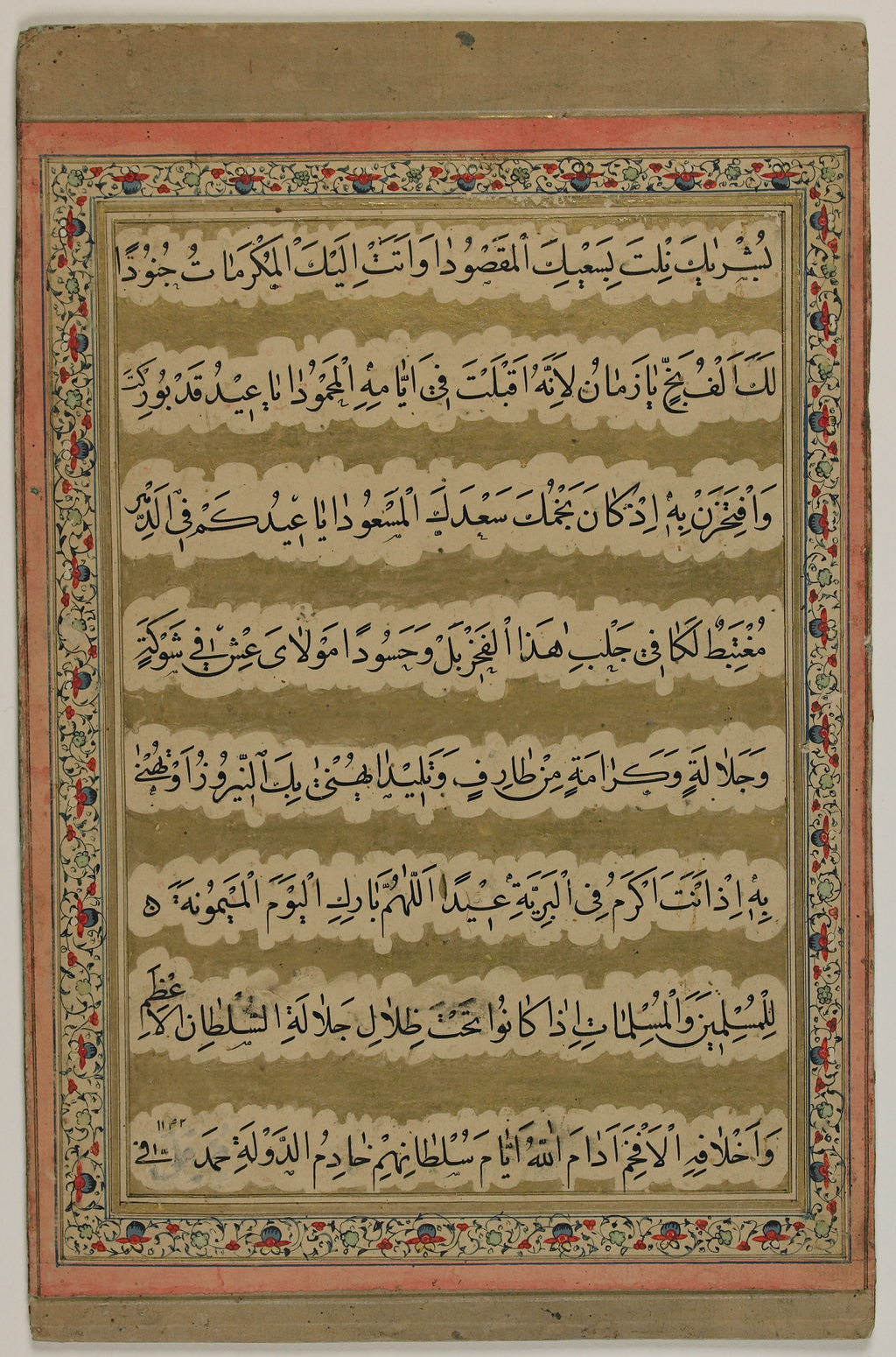
Arabic calligraphic fragment dated to the early 18th century displaying blessings for Eid al-Adha

=== Udhiyah ===
After the Eid prayer, udhiyah (ritual animal sacrifice) is performed. Muslims who can afford it sacrifice halal livestock, usually a camel, goat, sheep, or ram, as a symbol of Abraham's willingness to sacrifice his only son. The animals have to meet certain age and quality standards to be considered for sacrifice. The meat from the sacrificed animal is generally divided into three parts: the family performing the udhiyah retains a third; while the remainder is equally divided between friends and relatives, and the poor.

The tradition for Eid al-Adha involves slaughtering an animal and sharing the meat in three equal parts – for family, for relatives and friends, and for poor people. The goal is to make sure every Muslim gets to eat meat. However, there is a dissent among Muslim scholars regarding the obligatory nature of this sacrifice. While some scholars, such as Al-Kasani, categorise the sacrifice as obligatory (wāǧib), others regard it only as an "established custom" (sunna mu'akkada). Alternatives such as charitable donations or fasting have been suggested to be permissible by several fuqaha.

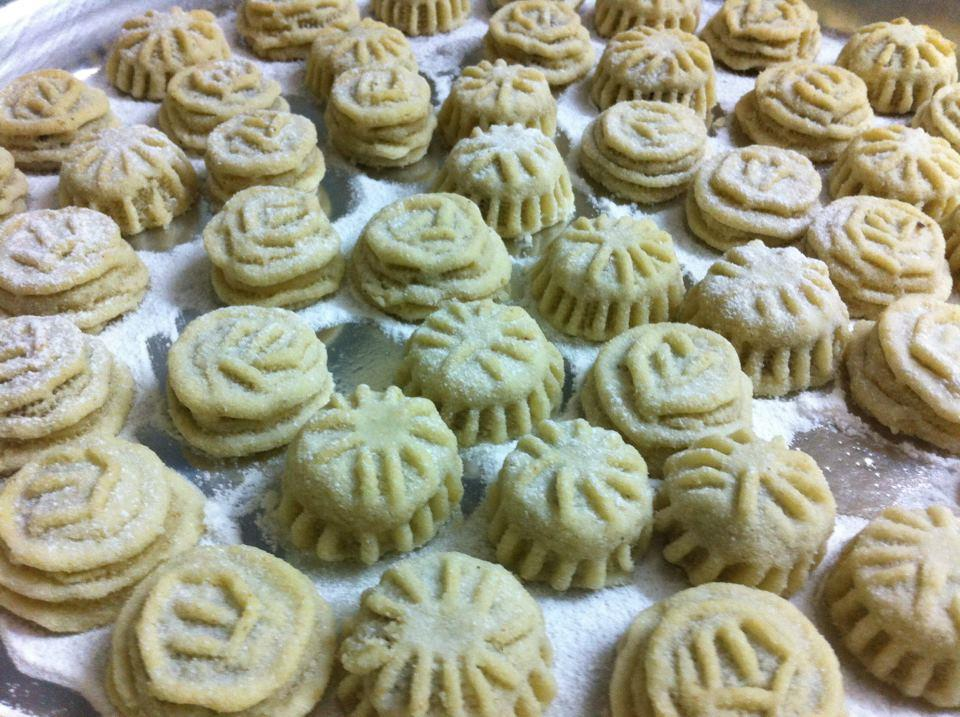
Ma'amoul, a traditional Eid cookie in parts of the Muslim world

Muslims are expected to dress in their finest clothing to perform Eid prayer in a large congregation in an open waqf ("stopping") field called Eidgah or mosque. Cuisine traditionally associated with Eid al-Adha includes ma'amoul and samosas.

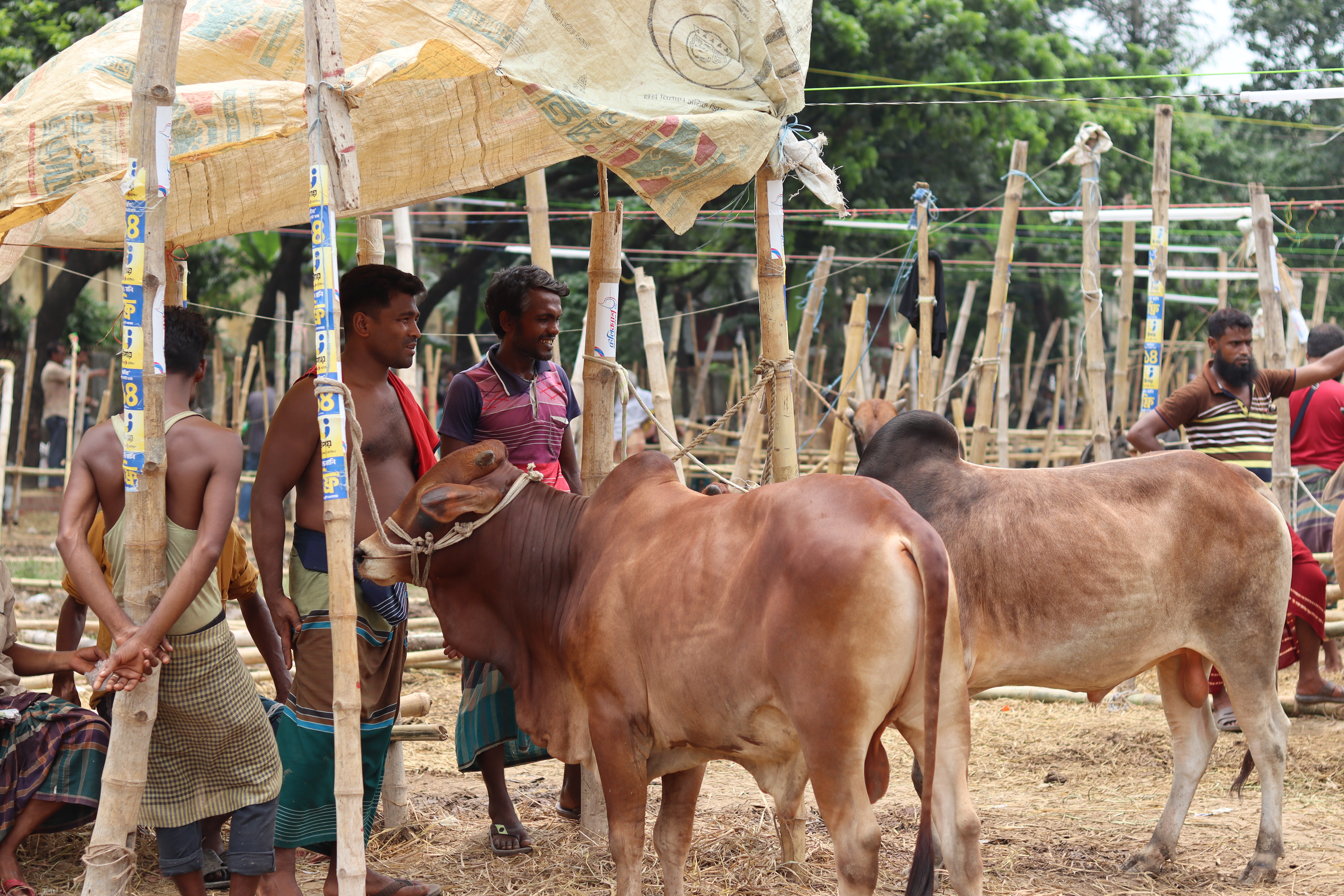
Cattle market for Eid al-Adha in Dhaka, Bangladesh

== Traditions around the world ==
=== Bangladesh ===
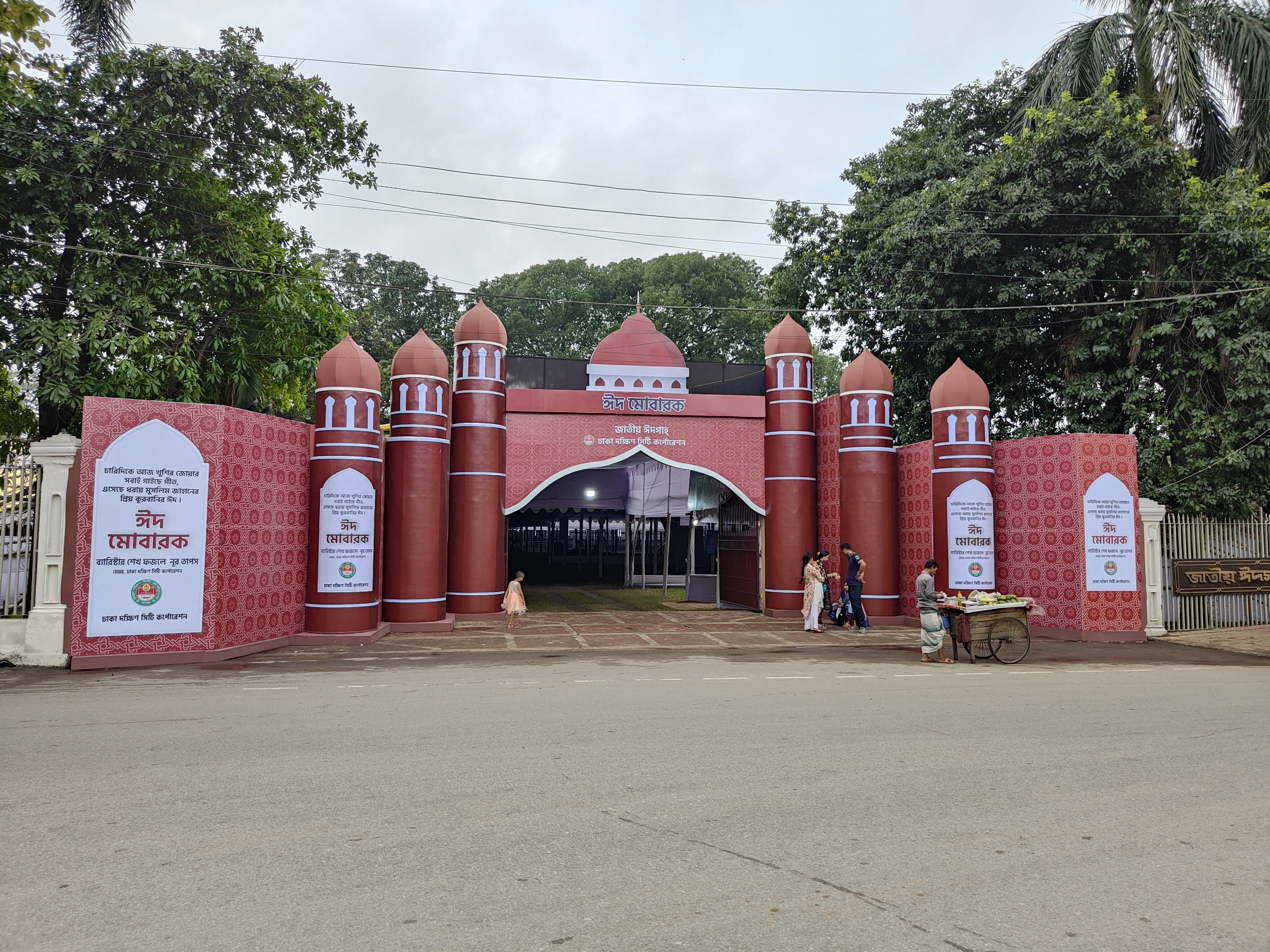
National Eidgah's entrance decorated for Eid Prayer

Eid al-Adha (Bengali: ঈদুল আযহা, romanized: Īdul Āzhā) is commonly known as Korbanir Eid (Bengali: কোরবানির ঈদ, romanized: Kōrbānir Īd, lit. 'Eid of sacrifice') or Bakri Eid (Bengali: বকরি ঈদ, romanized: Bôkri Īd, lit. 'Eid of the goat') among Bangladeshis. Bangladesh sacrifices most animals per year during Eid al-Adha, estimates indicate about 13 million animals are sacrificed each year. Starting from the first day of Dhul-Hijjah, temporary cattle markets, known as haat begin to appear across Bangladesh. The animals are traditionally decorated with garlands. Many working people in Dhaka and go back to their hometowns to celebrate. Traditional Bangladeshi meat dishes like kala bhuna, chui jhal, khasir rezala and dates are eaten with pulao or rotis, traditionally made of rice flours, or pithas like chitoi and soi pitha. In Sylhet, nunor bora and handesh are traditionally served as snacks during tea times or addas.

=== Pakistan ===
Around the world, different traditions are followed on Eid al-Adha. In Pakistan, applying henna is a famous tradition amongst women. Children in Pakistan receive Eidi, which is money and gifts given from elders.

=== Middle East ===
In the Middle East, traditional sweets are made.

=== Africa ===
In African nations, gifts are given among friends and family is invited to feasts. While the cultures are different, the key values of celebration remain the same. Those values are giving, feasts, family, and grant celebrations.

== In the Gregorian calendar ==
Conversion of Hijri years 1343 to 1500 to the Gregorian calendar, with first days of al-Muharram (brown), Ramadan (grey) and Shawwal (black) bolded, and Eid al-Adha dotted – in the SVG file, hover over a spot to show its dates and a line to show the month

While Eid al-Adha is always on the same day of the Islamic calendar, the date on the Gregorian calendar varies from year to year as the Islamic calendar is a lunar calendar and the Gregorian calendar is a solar calendar. The lunar calendar is approximately eleven days shorter than the solar calendar. (Note: Because the Hijri year differs by about 11 days from the AD year, Eid al-Adha can occur twice a year, in the year 1029, 1062, 1094, 1127, 1159, 1192, 1224, 1257, 1290, 1322, 1355, 1387, 1420, 1452, 1485, 1518, 1550, 1583, 1615, 1648, 1681, 1713, 1746, 1778, 1811, 1844, 1876, 1909, 1941, 1974, 2007, 2039, 2072, 2104, 2137, 2169, 2202, 2235, 2267 and 2300 (will continue to occur every 32 or 33 years).) Each year, Eid al-Adha (like other Islamic holidays) falls on one of about two to four Gregorian dates in parts of the world, because the boundary of crescent visibility is different from the International Date Line.

The following list shows the official dates of Eid al-Adha for Saudi Arabia as announced by the Supreme Judicial Council. Future dates are estimated according to the Umm al-Qura calendar of Saudi Arabia which is used only as a guide for planning purpose and not as the absolute determinant of dates. The Umm al-Qura calendar is just a guide for planning purposes and not the absolute determinant or fixer of dates. Although future dates are presented as estimates based on the Umm al-Qura calendar, critics have argued that official announcements have at times closely mirrored the pre-calculated calendar even in cases where astronomers considered sighting conditions extremely poor or effectively impossible. When Questioned, authorities however, maintain that the Umm al-Qura calendar is used only for planning purposes and that final confirmation is made through reported moon sightings on the 29th day of the preceding lunar month. to announce the specific dates for both Hajj rituals and the subsequent Eid festival. The three days after the listed date are also part of the festival. The time before the listed date the pilgrims visit Mount Arafat and descend from it after sunrise of the listed day.

In many countries, the start of any lunar Hijri month varies based on the observation of the new moon by local religious authorities, so the exact day of celebration varies by locality.

== See also ==
- Eid al-Ghadir
- Shab-e-Barat
- Quds Day
- Glossary of Islam
- Outline of Islam
- Index of Islam-related articles

== Sources ==
- Mittwoch, E. (1971). "ʿĪd al-Aḍḥā". In Lewis, B.; Ménage, V. L.; Pellat, Ch. & Schacht, J. (eds.). The Encyclopaedia of Islam, Second Edition. Volume III: H–Iram. Leiden: E. J. Brill. p. 1007. doi:10.1163/1573-3912_islam_SIM_3472. OCLC 495469525.
