= Act of God =

Natural disaster outside human control

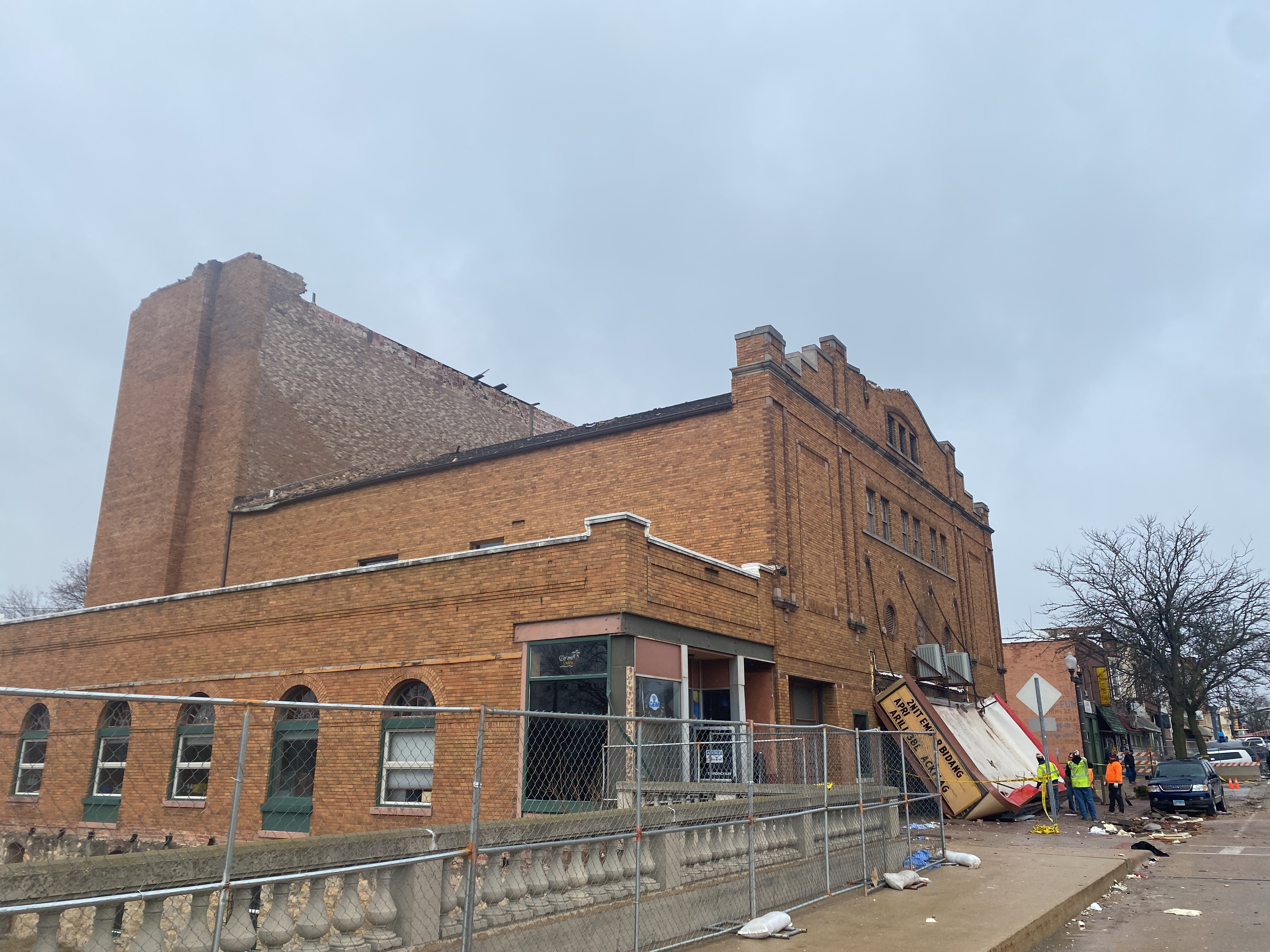
In Illinois, the Belvidere Apollo Theatre collapsed after being struck by a tornado, injuring dozens and killing one, in what was claimed in court to be an act of God.

In legal usage in the English-speaking world, an act of God, act of nature, or damnum fatale ("loss arising from inevitable accident") is an event caused by no direct human action (e.g. severe or extreme weather and other natural disasters) for which individual persons are not responsible and cannot be held legally liable for loss of life, injury, or property damage. An act of God may amount to an exception to liability in contracts (as under the Hague–Visby Rules), or it may be an "insured peril" in an insurance policy. In Scots law, the equivalent term is damnum fatale, while most common law legal systems use the term act of God. It is legally distinct from—though often related to—a common clause found in contract law known as force majeure.

== Contract law ==
In the law of contracts, an act of God may be interpreted as an implied defense under the rule of impossibility or impracticability. If so, the promise is discharged because of unforeseen occurrences which were unavoidable and would result in insurmountable delay, expense, or other material breach.

Under the English common law, contractual obligations were deemed sacrosanct, so failure to honor a contract could lead to an order for specific performance or internment in a debtor's prison. In 1863, this harsh rule was softened by the case of Taylor v Caldwell which introduced the doctrine of frustration of contract, which provided "where a contract becomes impossible to perform and neither party is at fault, both parties may be excused their obligations". In this case, a music hall was burned down before the contract of hire could be fulfilled. The court implied a term into the contract for hire which stipulated the continued existence of the music hall since this was essential to the contract's performance. Blackburn J states [at 29]:

"The principle seems to us to be that in contracts in which the performance depends on the continued existence of a given person or thing, a condition is implied that the impossibility of performance arising from the perishing of the person or thing shall excuse the performance."

The court thus deemed the contract frustrated. The fact that neither party was to blame for the fire was essential to the judgement.

In other contracts, such as indemnification, an act of God may be no excuse and in fact may be the central risk assumed by the promisor—e.g., flood insurance or crop insurance—the only variables being the timing and extent of the damage. In many cases, failure by way of ignoring obvious risks due to "natural phenomena" will not be sufficient to excuse performance of the obligation, even if the events are relatively rare: e.g., the year 2000 problem in computers. Under the Uniform Commercial Code, 2-615, failure to deliver goods sold may be excused by an "act of God" if the absence of such act was a "basic assumption" of the contract, and the act has made the delivery "commercially impracticable".

Recently, human activities have been claimed to be the root causes of some events previously considered natural disasters. In particular:

- Geothermal injections of water provoking earthquakes (Basel, Switzerland, 2003)
- Drilling provoking a mud volcano (Java, 2008)

As a general principle of act of God, epidemic can be classified as an act of God if the epidemic was unforeseeable and renders the promise discharged if the promisor cannot avoid the effect of the epidemic by exercise of reasonable prudence, diligence and care, or by the use of those means which the situation renders reasonable to employ.

== Tort law and delict law ==
=== England and Wales ===
An act of God is an unforeseeable natural phenomenon. Explained by Lord Hobhouse in Transco plc v Stockport Metropolitan Borough Council as describing an event:

1. which involves no human agency
2. which is not realistically possible to guard against
3. which is due directly and exclusively to natural causes and
4. which could not have been prevented by any amount of foresight, plans, and care.

=== Scotland ===
In Tennant v Earl of Glasgow (1864 2 M (HL) 22) Lord Chancellor Westbury describes a case as: "what is denominated in the law of Scotland damnum fatale — occurrences and circumstances which no human foresight can provide against, and of which human prudence is not bound to recognize the possibility; and which, when they do occur, therefore, are calamities that do not involve the obligation of paying for the consequences that may result from them."

=== United States ===
In the law of torts, an act of God may be asserted as a type of intervening cause, the lack of which would have avoided the cause or diminished the result of liability (e.g., but for the earthquake, the old, poorly constructed building would be standing). However, foreseeable results of unforeseeable causes may still raise liability. For example, a bolt of lightning strikes a ship carrying volatile compressed gas, resulting in the expected explosion. Liability may be found if the carrier did not use reasonable care to protect against sparks—regardless of their origins. Similarly, strict liability could defeat a defense for an act of God where the defendant has created the conditions under which any accident would result in harm. For example, a long-haul truck driver takes a shortcut on a back road and the load is lost when the road is destroyed in an unforeseen flood. Other cases find that a common carrier is not liable for the unforeseeable forces of nature. See Memphis & Charlestown RR Co. v. Reeves, 77 U.S. 176 (1870).

One example is that of "rainmaker" Charles Hatfield, who was hired in 1915 by the city of San Diego to fill the Morena Reservoir to capacity with rainwater for $10,000. The region was flooded by heavy rains, nearly bursting the reservoir's dam, killing nearly 20 people, destroying 110 bridges (leaving 2), knocking out telephone and telegraph lines, and causing an estimated $3.5 million in damages. When the city refused to pay him (he had forgotten to sign the contract), he sued the city. The floods were ruled an act of God, excluding him from liability but also from payment.

== See also ==
- Divine retribution
- Vis major
- Hardship clause
- Extreme event attribution
