= Vis major =

Latin legal term meaning 'superior force'

Vis major (/vɪs ˈmeɪdʒər/ viss MAY-jər; Latin for 'a superior force') is a greater or superior force; an irresistible force. It may be a loss that results immediately from a natural cause that could not have been prevented by the exercise of prudence, diligence and care. It is also termed as vis divina or superior force.

It is an irresistible violence; inevitable accident or act of God. Its nature and power absolutely uncontrollable, for example, the inroads of a hostile army or forcible robberies, may relieve from liability from contract.

This term has specific meaning in regard to strict liability. Strict liability in the law of torts allows for the accrual of liability against an actor where there is no fault or proximate cause given the damages arose from their participation in an ultrahazardous activity, i.e. blasting, damming of water, etc. However, "vis major" offers an exception to such liability. In Fletcher v. Rylands In the Exchequer Chamber, L.R. 1 Ex. 265, 1866, affirmed in the House of Lords on appeal in Rylands v. Fletcher L.R. 3 H.L. 330, the exception of vis major is introduced:

"[Defendant] can excuse himself by showing that the escape [of a dangerous substance] was owing to the plaintiff's default; or perhaps that the escape was the consequence of vis major, or the act of God... [emphasis added]" -Blackburn J Fletcher v. Rylands L.R. 1 Ex. 265, 1866.

The existence of vis major, or an act of God, will preclude the use of the theory of strict liability given the impossibility of anticipating such an event. For example, this might include a dam breaking after a hurricane where there is no negligence found on the part of the owner/operator of the dam.

== See also ==
- Force majeure
- Act of God
