= Hoenig v Isaacs =

English contract law case

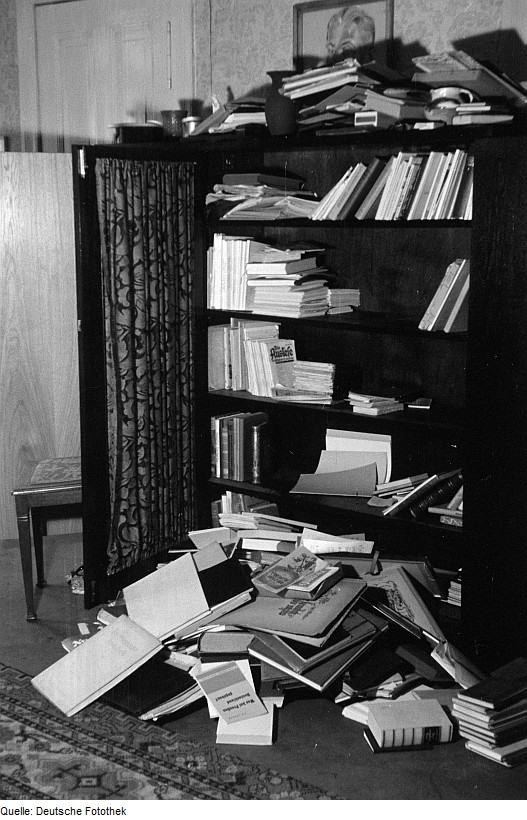
- Court: Court of Appeal
- Citations: [1952] EWCA Civ 6, 2 All ER 176
- Transcript: Full text of judgment

Court membership
- Judges sitting: Somervell LJ, Denning LJ, Romer LJ

Hoenig v Isaacs [1952] EWCA Civ 6 is an English contract law case concerning substantial performance of an entire obligation.

== Facts ==
Mr Hoenig was contracted to decorate and furnish Mr Isaacs' flat for £750. When the work was done, there were problems with a bookcase and wardrobe, which would cost £55 to fix. Mr Isaacs refused to pay the £350 outstanding.

== Judgment ==
Somervell LJ upheld the decision of an Official Referee at first instance, His Honour Sir Lionel Leach, in finding there had been substantial compliance. He noted that each case turns on the construction of the contract. Where there is substantial performance of the contract, then money must be paid. The work was done, and then there was merely a damages claim in respect of the faulty parts. He noted the case was near the border line for substantial performance and disallowed the appeal.

Denning LJ also disallowed the appeal and gave judgment as follows.

When a contract provides for a specific sum to be paid on completion of specified work, the Courts lean against a construction of the contract which would deprive the contractor of any payment at all simply because there are some defects or omissions. The promise to complete the work is therefore construed as a term of the contract, but not as a condition. It is not every breach of that term which absolves the employer from his promise to pay the price, but only a breach which goes to the root of the contract, such as an abandonment of the work when it is only half done. Unless the breach does go to the root of the matter, the employer cannot resist payment of the price. He must pay it and bring a cross-claim for the defects and omissions, or alternatively set them up in diminution of the price. The measure is the amount which the work is worth less by reason of the defects and omissions, and is usually calculated by the cost of making them good.

== See also ==
- Jacob & Youngs v. Kent, 230 N.Y. 239 (1921) the possible inspiration, and judgment by Cardozo J in New York
- Cutter v Powell (1795) 101 ER 573
- Sumpter v Hedges [1898] 1 QB 673
- Bolton v Mahadeva [1972] 2 All ER 1322
- Wilusynski v London Borough of Tower Hamlets [1989] ICR 493, Nicholls LJ holding no "substantial performance" by - and no pay whatsoever for - a council worker on industrial action who did everything but answer enquiries from councillors.
