= Clausula rebus sic stantibus =

Legal doctrine

Clausula rebus sic stantibus is the legal doctrine allowing for a contract or a treaty to become inapplicable because of a fundamental change of circumstances. In public international law the doctrine essentially serves an "escape clause" to the general rule of pacta sunt servanda (promises must be kept). Because the doctrine is a risk to the security of treaties, as its scope is relatively unconfined, the conditions in which it may be invoked must be carefully noted.

This term is related to force majeure and hardship clause.

== Function in international law ==
The doctrine is part of customary international law but is also provided for in the 1969 Vienna Convention on the Law of Treaties, under Article 62 (Fundamental Change of Circumstance). Although the doctrine is not mentioned by name, Article 62 provides the only justifications for its invocation: the circumstances that existed at the time of the conclusion of the treaty were indeed objectively essential to the obligations of treaty (sub-paragraph A), and the instance for the change of circumstances has had a radical effect on the obligations of the treaty (sub-paragraph B).

Clausula rebus sic stantibus relates to changed circumstances only if they had never been contemplated by the parties: if the parties to a treaty had contemplated for the occurrence of the changed circumstances, the doctrine does not apply and the provision remains in effect. This principle is clarified in the Fisheries Jurisdiction Case (United Kingdom v. Iceland, 1973).

Although it is clear that a fundamental change of circumstances might justify terminating or modifying a treaty, the unilateral denunciation of a treaty is usually thought to be prohibited: although the point is debated, it is usually thought that a party does not have the right to denounce a treaty unilaterally.

== Function in private law ==
The principle of clausula rebus sic stantibus exists in all legal systems which descend from Roman law. In Swiss law, article 119 of the Swiss Code of Obligations is the source of the principle's applicability in Swiss contract law.

== History ==
Clausula rebus sic stantibus comes from Latin (where rebus sic stantibus is Latin for "with things thus standing" or, more idiomatically, "as things stand").

A key figure in the formulation of clausula rebus sic stantibus was the Italian jurist Scipione Gentili (1563–1616), who is generally credited for coining the maxim omnis conventio intelligitur rebus sic stantibus ('every convention is understood with circumstances as they stand'). The Swiss legal expert Emer de Vattel (1714–1767) was the next key contributor. Vattel promoted the view that "every body bound himself for the future only on the stipulation of the presence of the actual conditions" and so "with a change of the condition also the relations originating from the situation would undergo a change". During the 19th century, civil law came to reject the doctrine of clausula rebus sic standibus, but Vattel's thinking continued to influence international law, not least because it helped reconcile "the antagonism between the static nature of the law and the dynamism of international life". While individual cases invoking the doctrine were much disputed, the doctrine itself was little questioned. Its provision in the 1969 Vienna Convention on the Law of Treaties established the doctrine firmly but not without dispute as "a norm of international law".

== Examples ==
- According to Polybius, in 211 BC, Lyciscus of Acarnania argued that the Lacedaemonians should abandon their treaty with the Aetolian League because of fundamentally changed circumstances. This is perhaps the earliest recorded example of the principle of rebus sic stantibus at work.
- Elizabeth I of England sought to amend the 1585 Treaty of Nonsuch on the grounds of fundamentally changed circumstances, but her efforts have not been well regarded by modern jurists.
- In a "classic" case for the doctrine, Russia attempted to change the terms of the Treaty of Paris (1856) on military shipping in the Black Sea. Russia achieved this in connection with the Treaty of London (1871), partly by invoking clausula rebus sic stantibus. One important outcome was the insistence by other parties that unilateral termination of a treaty was not legal on those grounds.
- Article 59 of the Treaty of Berlin (1878) made Batumi a free port. In 1886, Russia terminated the arrangement, partly on the grounds of a fundamental change in circumstances.
- In 1881, the United States attempted to end the Clayton–Bulwer Treaty with the United Kingdom. Various arguments were advanced, including clausula rebus sic stantibus. Although that principle ultimately did not apply in the resolution of the case, it is noteworthy as the first time that the US invoked the principle, as it had previously been opposed to it. The US went on to cite the doctrine again in its arguments for the revision of the Treaty of London (1915).
- During the 1908 Bosnian crisis, Austria-Hungary renounced its rights and obligations under Article 25 of the Treaty of Berlin (1878). Austria-Hungary's arguments have been seen as an invocation of fundamentally changed circumstances. Moreover, despite protests at its actions, Austria-Hungary succeeded, arguably setting a precedent for the use of the doctrine.
- On 7 February 1923, the Permanent Court of International Justice issued an advisory opinion on a case between France and the United Kingdom on the application to British nationals of French nationality decrees issued by the capitulatory regimes in Tunis and Morocco. France cited a fundamental change of circumstances, and the case seems to be the first example of a state invoking rebus sic stantibus before an international court. However, the states settled before the court was required to issue a verdict.
- In 1924, Norway dissolved its 1907 treaty with Sweden that had arisen from the dissolution of the union between Norway and Sweden, citing changed circumstances including the Russian Revolution, the Treaty of Versailles and Norway's entry into the League of Nations. Since the 1907 treaty was also time-limited, the case has been seen as a precedent for rebus sic stantibus applying not only to indefinite treaties.
- In 1926, China came to terms with Belgium after its efforts to denounce the Sino-Belgian Pact (1865), citing fundamentally changed circumstances.
- In November 1923, France moved its customs office to Gex, Ain, provoking the "Freezones Controversy" with Switzerland. The matter was brought before the Permanent Court of International Justice, and France invoked rebus sic stantibus, but Switzerland argued that the doctrine did not apply in respect of territorial rights. In 1932, the court found in favour of Switzerland on the basis of fact, but it did not reject that rebus sic stantibus might be a valid basis for France's argument. It was the second time rebus sic stantibus had been argued before an international court.
