= National Eidgah =

Religious congregation site in Bangladesh

- জাতীয় ঈদগাহ
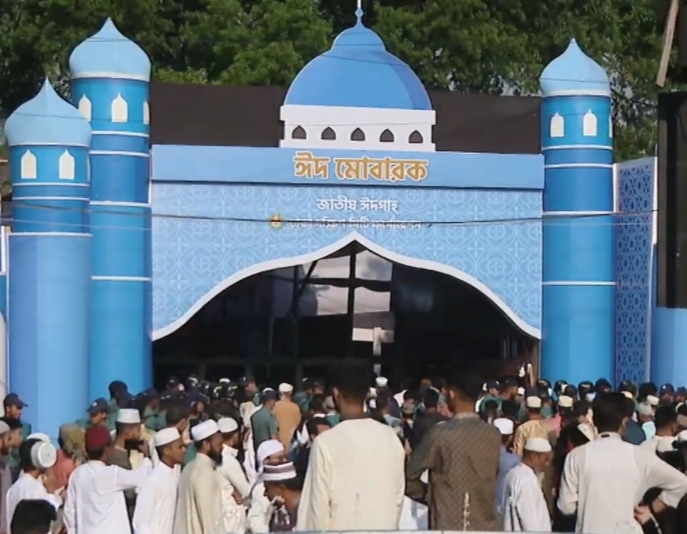
- Eid prayers at National Eidgah, 2023

Religion
- Affiliation: Islam
- Branch/tradition: Sunni Islam
- District: Dhaka District

Location
- Location: Dhaka, Bangladesh

Architecture
- Type: Eidgah

The National Eidgah (Bengali: জাতীয় ঈদগাহ) of Bangladesh is the central Eidgah for the two biggest celebrations of Muslims in Bangladesh, Eid-ul-Fitr and Eid-ul-Azha. It is located in the High Court premises of Dhaka. Important administrative figures of Bangladesh offer Eid prayers at this Eidgah. The National Eidgah is a place of Eid prayers designated by the Bangladesh government. The President of Bangladesh, Prime Minister of Bangladesh, Chief adviser of Bangladesh, Chief Justice of Bangladesh, cabinet members, heads of the three services, members of parliament, politicians, military and civil officials and people of all ages from different classes and professions offer prayers here.

== History ==
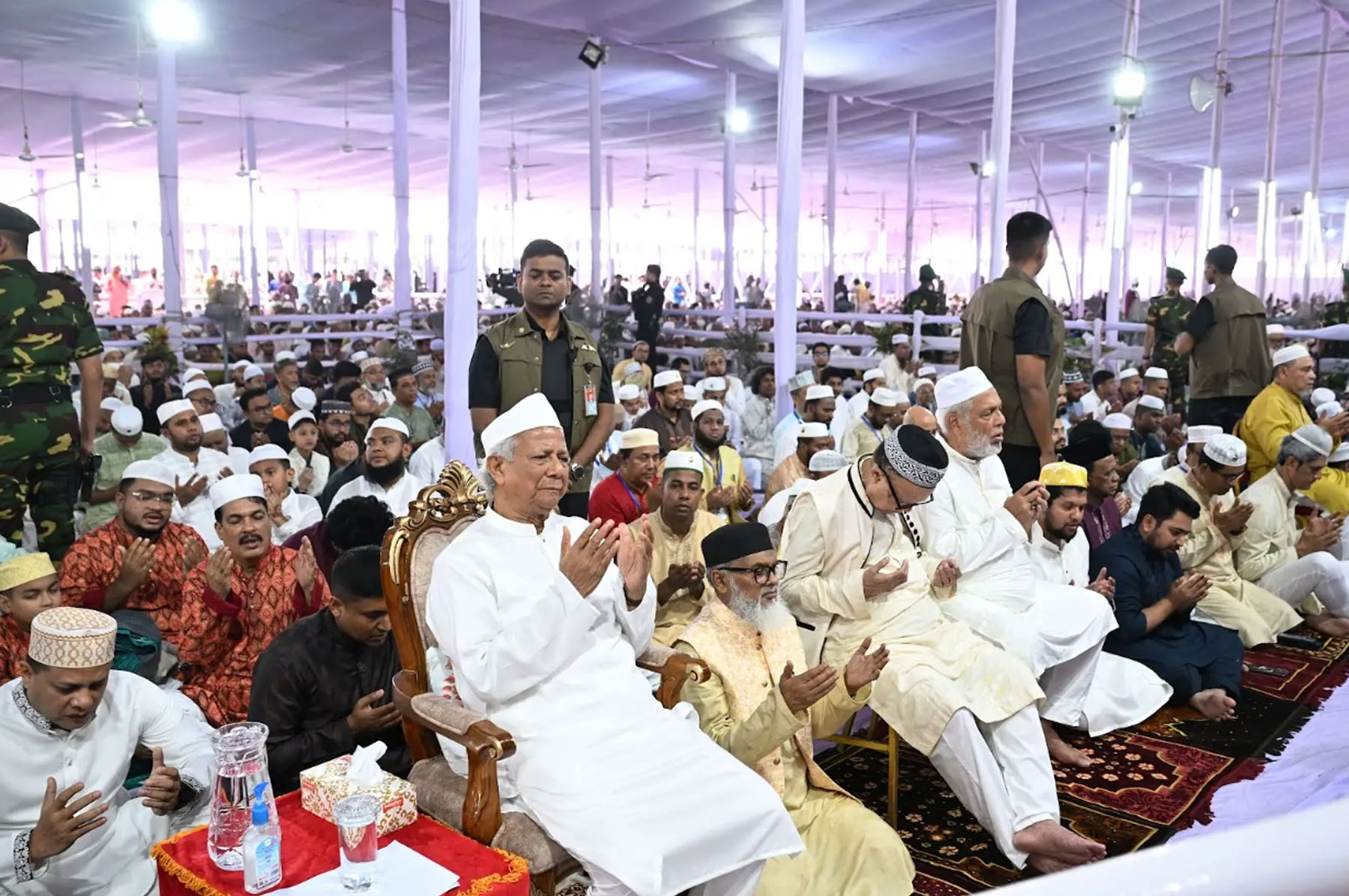
Chief Adviser Muhammad Yunus (seated in the middle) attending Eid prayer in the National Eidgah

Even before independence, the area next to the High Court was full of bushes. There was a pond in the middle of that area. Around 1981–82, that bush was cleared. There is a shrine in the High Court premises. When the place became a little known, Eid prayers started being offered there on a small scale by putting up a canopy. Around 1985, the authorities filled up the pond. Later, around 1987–88, the government declared that Eidgah as the National Eidgah. Although the Eidgah is currently operated under the Bangladesh High Court, it is looked after by the Public Works Department. In 2000, the Dhaka City Corporation was given the responsibility of preparing the Eidgah for both Eids.

The huge field, surrounded by iron walls, has several gates, including a main gate. There is a mihrab facing the Qibla. The mihrab is basically made of five minarets. At least one lakh worshippers can pray together in a congregation at the National Eidgah. There is a separate arrangement for women to pray in the same congregation. Here, 20,000 women can pray together.

The history of the National Eidgah in Bangladesh is very old. In 2020 and 2021, Eid prayers were not held at the National Eidgah due to the outbreak of the coronavirus.

The area of the National Eidgah ground in Dhaka is more than 270,277 square feet. The National Eidgah is basically a wide open field, this field is decorated before Eid to make it suitable for prayers. Thousands of workers are required to make the entire field suitable for prayers. It is estimated that 43,000 bamboos and about 300 tons of rope are used to build the pandals in the Eidgah grounds every time. About 35,000 worshippers can pray at the National Eidgah Maidan in Dhaka at the same time.
