= Chlaeneas =

Chlaeneas (Ancient Greek: Χλαινέας), an Aetolian, was sent by his countrymen as ambassador to the Lacedaemonians in 211 BCE, to excite them against Philip V of Macedon. He is reported by the historian Polybius as dwelling very cogently (δυσαντιπ̓π̔ήτως) on the oppressive encroachments of all the successive kings of Macedonia from Philip II of Macedon downwards, as well as on the sure defeat which awaited Philip from the confederacy then formed against him.

Chlaeneas was opposed by the Acarnanian envoy Lyciscus, but the Lacedaemonians were induced to join the league of the Romans with the Aetolians and Attalus I.
