= Bolton v Mahadeva =

English contract law case

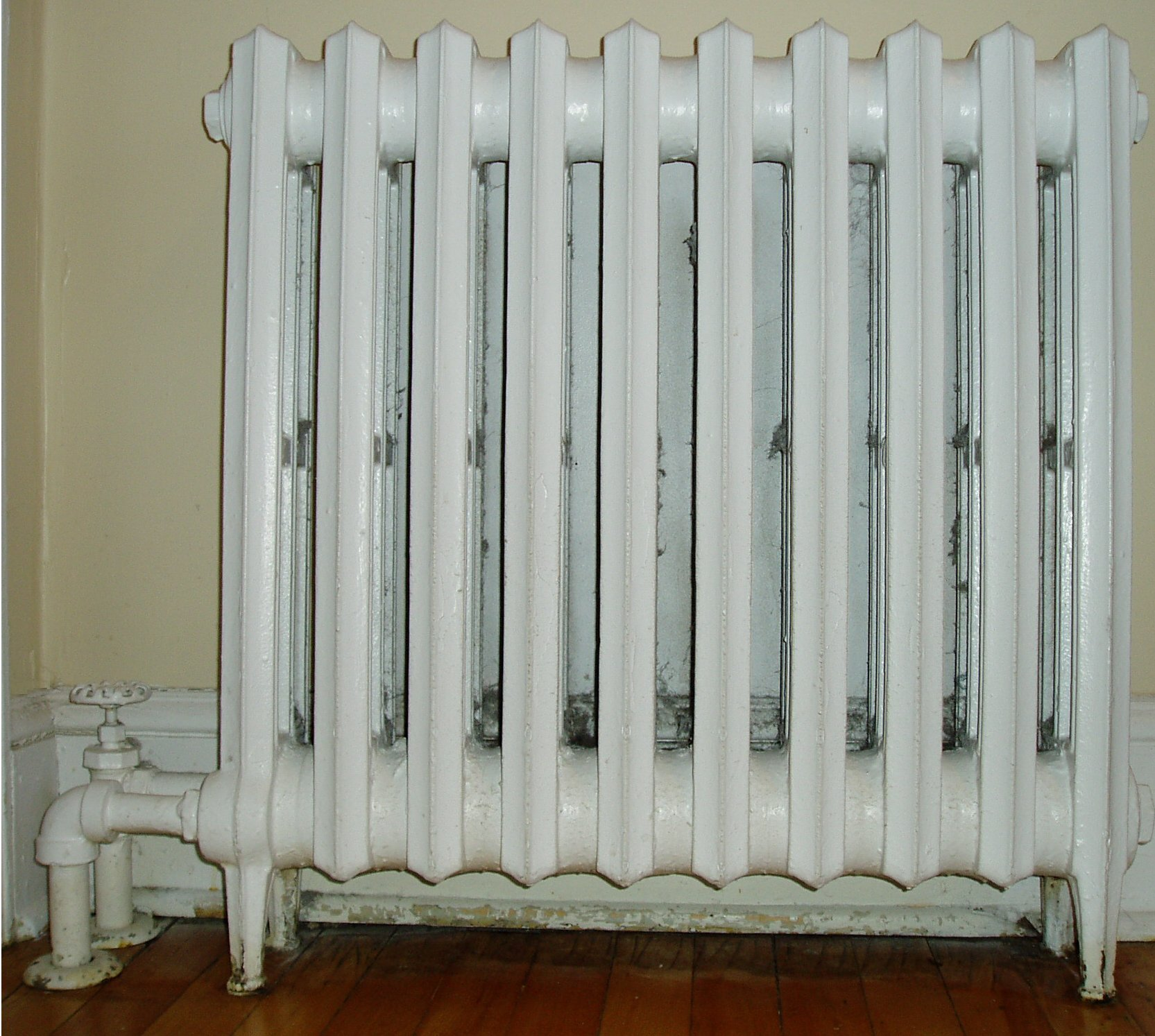
- Court: Court of Appeal
- Decided: 13 April 1972
- Citation: [1972] EWCA Civ 5, [1972] 1 WLR 1009, [1972] 2 All ER 1322

Court membership
- Judges sitting: Sachs LJ, Buckley LJ and Cairns LJ

Bolton v Mahadeva [1972] EWCA Civ 5 is an English contract law case concerning substantial performance of an obligation.

== Facts ==
Mr Walter Charles Bolton installed central heating for £560 in Mr T Mahadeva's house. Mahadeva alleged that the house was too cold, the heat was delivered and the system all gave off fumes. Bolton refused to correct it, which would cost £174. Mahadeva refused to pay any money at all. Bolton sued.

The Brentford Deputy County Court judge, Sir Graeme Finlay, held that the contract price needed to be paid, minus a sum for the cost of putting the heating system right (a total of £446, including labour).

== Judgment ==
Sachs LJ held that Bolton was entitled to nothing because there had been no substantial performance at all. At 1015 he said, ‘It is not merely that so very much of the work was shoddy, but it is the general ineffectiveness of it for its primary purpose that leads me to that conclusion.’

== Significance ==
- Law Commission, No.121, ‘Pecuniary Restitution for Breach of Contract’ (1983) para. 2.32, criticised this saying a benefit conferred is one that should be paid for, unless the contract said otherwise. Brian Davenport QC dissented.
- Miles v Wakefield Borough Council [1987] AC 539, Lord Bridge and Lord Brightman reincarnating the doctrine in Cutter v Powell to use against a council registrar who refused to work 3 out of 37 hours, as part of industrial action. They advised the employer that they needed to pay nothing.
- Wiluszynski v London Borough of Tower Hamlets [1989] ICR 493, Nicholls LJ holding no "substantial performance" by - and no pay whatsoever for - a council worker on industrial action who did everything but answer enquiries from councillors.

== See also ==
- Jacob & Youngs v. Kent, 230 N.Y. 239 (1921) the possible inspiration, and judgment by Cardozo J in New York
- Cutter v Powell (1795) 101 ER 573
- Sumpter v Hedges [1898] 1 QB 673
- Hoenig v Isaacs [1952] EWCA Civ 6, 2 All ER 176
