= Lyciscus of Acarnania =

Ancient Greek diplomat

Lyciscus (Ancient Greek: Λυκίσκος) was a diplomat in Ancient Greece during the third century BCE. An Acarnanian, he was sent by his countrymen as ambassador to the Lacedaemonians in 211 BCE to urge them to ally themselves with Philip V of Macedon (or at any rate not to join the Romans and Aetolian League).

He defended the kings of Macedonia from the attack of Chlaeneas, and dwelt on the danger of allowing the Romans to gain a footing in Greece and on the indignity of the descendants of those who had repulsed Xerxes and his barbarians becoming now the confederates of other barbarians against Greeks.

As recounted by Polybius, Lyciscus's story is perhaps the first recorded application of what is now a legal doctrine in international law known as Clausula rebus sic stantibus, which allows for the dissolution of treaties due to fundamentally changed circumstances: as phrased by Polybius, this principle is that 'if the circumstances are the same now as the time when you made the alliance with the Aetolians, then your policy ought to remain on the same lines, but if they have been entirely changed, then it is a matter entirely new and unprejudiced'.
