= Hell or high water clause =

Contract clause mandating payments

A hell or high water clause is a clause in a contract, usually a lease, which provides that the payments must continue irrespective of any difficulties which the paying party may encounter, usually in relation to the operation of the leased asset. The clause usually forms part of a parent company guarantee that is intended to limit the applicability of the doctrines of impossibility or frustration of purpose. The term for the clause comes from a colloquial expression that a task must be accomplished "come hell or high water", that is, regardless of any difficulty.

== History ==
Linguistic historian Robert Hendrickson claims in his book Encyclopedia of Word and Phrase Origins that the saying derives from a phrase used by sailors in the 1600s "between the devil and the deep blue sea".

Other references come from the Bible in Isaiah 43:2 which speaks of Lord getting someone through water and rivers or fire.

The first mention of a hell or high water clause in United States case law was in the February 2, 1960, case of Matits vs. Nationwide Mutual Insurance Co. In that case, Nationwide sought to deny insurance coverage to a woman who loaned her car to a friend, after the friend got into a collision. Due to the particular wording of the omnibus clause within the insurance policy, which in itself contains the hell or high water clause, the court ruled that Nationwide must provide coverage for the collision.

== Applicable transactions ==
=== Equipment leases ===
One of the most common uses for a hell or high water clause is the writing of equipment leases. Whether or not the phrase "hell or high water" is explicitly written, the general meaning of it has been included in a majority of equipment leasing contracts over the past few decades. The clause requires that the lessee assumes virtually the entirety of the risk associated with the rented equipment, even in extreme cases. This includes but is not limited to cases where the equipment is destroyed, lost in some way, deemed inoperable, neglected repairs, deemed unfit for use, or even when the purchaser dies.

=== Project finance transactions ===
Another key aspect of the protections provided by the hell or high water clause is that it applies to the lessor's funding sources. In the industry of equipment leasing, lessees have two broad options: lease equipment from a company that owns the equipment or sign a contract with an equipment finance company which will pay for the equipment. Even if the person or organization that funds the transaction did not sign the contract between the lessor and lessee, they are still shielded by the clause and can rest assured that nearly all the risk is attributed to the lessee, except in the case of credit failure. In cases where the lessor is viewed solely as a source for money, the lessor is provided special protections by Article 2A of the Uniform Commercial Code discussed in § Enforceability below.

=== Real estate leases ===
The concept of hell or high water exists in the real estate market, but only in commercial real estate. It is not very widely used in real estate, and is generally only used in bond leases, which are also referred to as "triple net leases" or "hell or high water leases". Typical triple net leases require tenants to be responsible for paying rent, utilities, maintenance, HVAC expenses, roofing repairs, and even property taxes. Hell or high water leases take the typical triple net lease a couple steps further by making the tenant to be responsible for every fathomable expense related to the property, which in effect makes the hell or high water lease the most extreme form of triple net leases. As with some other applicable transactions of hell or high water, this type of lease makes the tenant responsible for payments associated with unexpected events which some refer to as acts of god. At no point is the tenant allowed to terminate the lease or receive rent abatements. If a property is condemned for whatever reason, the tenant must continue to pay rent despite not being able to inhabit the property. If the property is destroyed or damaged, not only does the tenant still need to pay the agreed upon rent, but the tenant must pay to either replace or repair the building regardless if the insurance claim covers the cost.

=== Mergers and acquisitions ===
When attempting to merge two businesses or acquire another, one big roadblock that companies typically come across is antitrust law. Companies must negotiate on how to split the costs of potential litigation, fines, divestitures, and expensive antitrust investigations. When one party has more leverage in this negotiation, they may consider utilizing a hell or high water clause. This allows one party to assign all the financial risks associated with antitrust approval to the other party. It may seem surprising that any company would agree to a merger with a hell or high water clause, but sometimes agreeing to the clause is the only way the party with less leverage can secure the deal (e.g. because there are competitors for the stronger company). Additionally, companies may agree to a hell or high water clause because they assess that the risk of antitrust complications is low, or simply because the opportunity outweighs the risk. If a company agrees to take responsibility for all the risk by signing a hell or high water clause then they are required to take all actions possible to secure antitrust approval.

=== High-yield bonds (junk bonds) ===
When a company's credit rating falls it may have difficulty raising money via debt financing. Since it is riskier to buy a bond from a company with bad credit, their bonds are rated below invest-grade and referred to as junk bonds. To mitigate risk for noteholders, companies with low credit ratings that issue bonds must operate within a set of covenants that restrict the issuer's ability to take on further risk. Many of the covenants relate to the company incurring additional debt, but some covenants address changing ownership structure, paying dividends, or selling off assets. Despite all the restrictions of the covenants, companies are allowed some freedom through an idea called "baskets", where the company is allowed to bypass a certain covenant, usually by incurring a limited amount of debt in specific, agreed upon situations. The concept of hell or high water comes into play with a special basket that is named either the hell or high water basket or the general basket. This basket permits the company to incur a limited amount of debt for any reason, especially come hell or high water.

== Enforceability ==
In both United States law and English law, the hell or high water clause has historically been upheld in numerous cases. In the United States, this clause is given special protection under Article 2A of the Uniform Commercial Code when the agreement is classified as a finance lease. The article states that this special protection applies to a lease that "consists of an overall three-party transaction in which: (1) the lessor does not select, manufacture or supply the goods, (2) the lessor did not own the goods before the lease was arranged and (3) the lessee either approves the purchase contract or receives specified warranty and supplier information before signing the lease agreement".

=== Exceptions ===
There are some exceptions to the enforceability of the hell or high water clause:

- Fraud: The hell or high water clause is not enforceable when fraud is present at any point in the relationship. If the lessor allegedly lures a lessee into a dubious arrangement the agreement may be determined to be null and void. Another example of this is when the employees of an equipment vendor fraudulently represent themselves as agents of a finance lessor. See McNatt v Colonial Pacific.
- Purchaser refuses to accept goods: Unless it is explicitly specified otherwise in the contract, lessees can generally break an equipment leasing contract if they refuse to accept the goods, especially if the equipment or goods are faulty upon arrival.
- Intentional or willful acts of the lessor violating public policy
- Intentional or willful acts of the lessor to prevent the lessee from fulfilling contract

== Effects of the COVID-19 pandemic ==
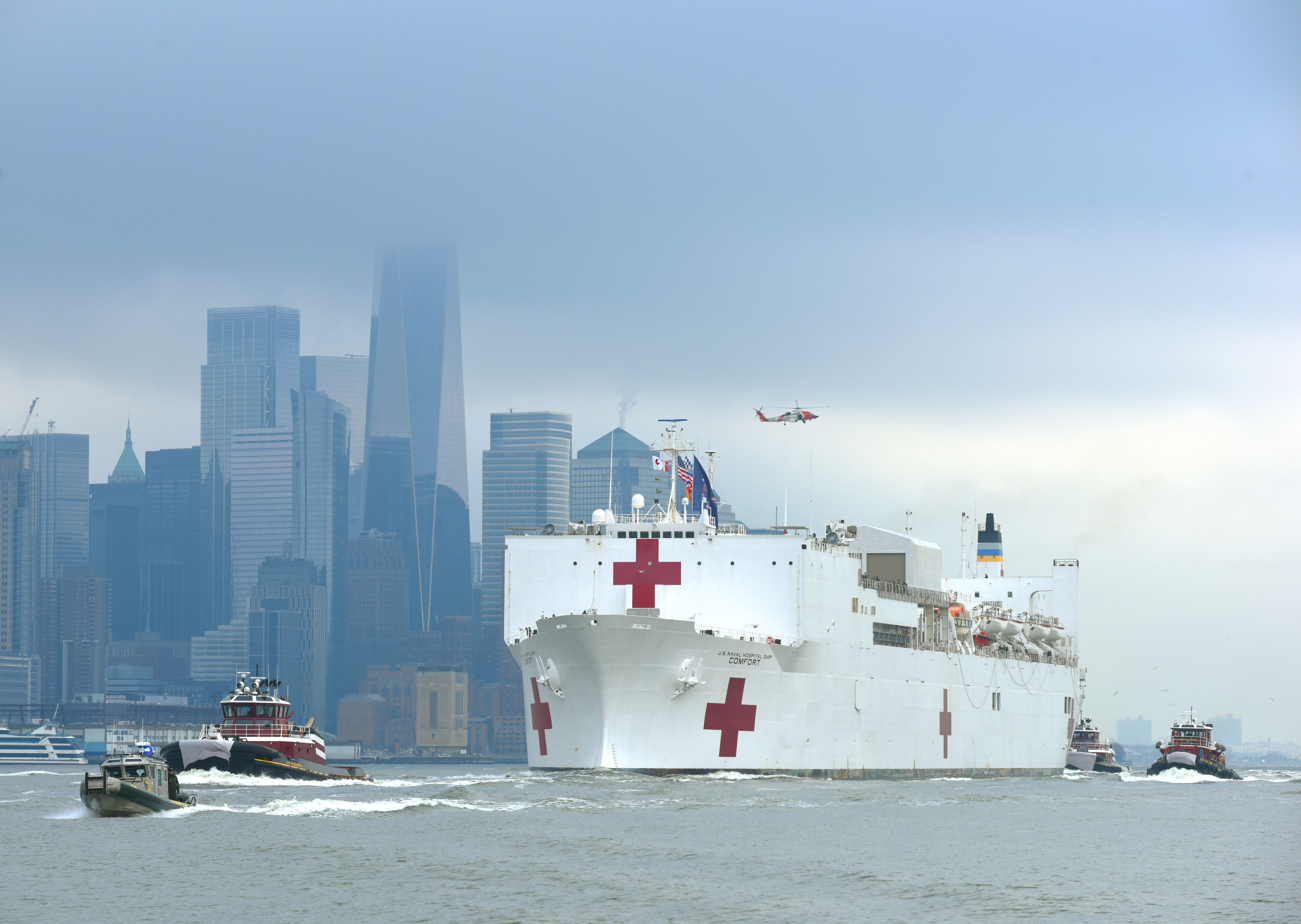
The hospital ship USNS Comfort arrives in Manhattan on 30 March 2020 to assist with the Covid-19 outbreak

During the COVID-19 pandemic, hell-or-high-water clauses were examined in disputes involving commercial leases and equipment financing agreements. Courts generally continued to enforce such clauses according to their terms, even where the pandemic disrupted business operations, emphasizing that payment obligations described as "absolute and unconditional" are not excused by external events.

In pandemic-era litigation, courts rejected arguments that government restrictions or reduced usability of leased assets relieved lessees of their obligations where contracts contained hell-or-high-water provisions. Legal commentary has similarly noted that these clauses continued to allocate risk to the obligor, limiting the effectiveness of defenses such as force majeure, impossibility, or frustration of purpose.

== Sample clause ==
[Party's] obligations to pay all amounts due are absolute and unconditional and shall not be subject to any abatement, reduction, set off, defense, counterclaim, interruption, deferment or recoupment for any reason whatsoever.

— Hitachi Data Sys. Credit Corp. v. Precision Discovery, Inc., 17-Cv-6851 (SHS) (S.D.N.Y. Aug. 13, 2019)

== Notable cases ==
- General Electric Capital Corp. v. FPL Services Corp., 986 F. Supp. 2d 1029 (N.D. Iowa 2013)
- Hitachi Data Sys. Credit Corp. v. Precision Discovery, Inc., 17-Cv-6851 (SHS), (S.D.N.Y. Sep. 24, 2020)
- McNatt v. Colonial Pacific Leasing Corp., 221 Ga. App. 768 (472 S.E.2d 435) (1996)
- Equitex, Inc. v. Ungar, 60 P.3d 746, 750 (Colo. App. 2002)
- Matits vs Nationwide Mutual Insurance Co., 59 N.J. Super. 373 (1960) (described in “History” section)

== See also ==
- Act of God
- Hardship clause
- Force majeure
- Meeting of the minds
