= Perfect tender rule =

United States commercial transaction law

In the United States, the perfect tender rule refers to the legal right for a buyer of goods to insist upon "perfect tender" by the seller. The rule appears in the Uniform Commercial Code (UCC) § 2-601. The UCC was designed "to simplify, clarify, modernize, and make uniform the law of commercial transactions."

In a contract for the sale of goods, if the goods fail to conform exactly to the description in the contract (whether as to quality, quantity, or manner of delivery) the buyer may nonetheless accept the goods, or reject the goods, or reject the nonconforming part of the tender and accept the conforming part. The buyer does not have an unfettered ability to reject tender.

While the UCC § 2-601 codifies the perfect tender rule, it also expressly limits it by "referring to § 2-612, which pertains to installment contracts, and § 2-718 and 2-719, which allow contractual limitations on remedies." Other UCC provisions also restrict the perfect tender concept.

Contrast the perfect tender rule, which applies through the UCC to the sale of goods, with the substantial performance doctrine, which applies in the common law to non-UCC cases.
