= Impracticability =

The doctrine of impracticability in the common law of contracts excuses performance of a duty, where the said duty has become unfeasibly difficult or expensive for the party who was to perform.

Impracticability is similar in some respects to the doctrine of impossibility because it is triggered by the occurrence of a condition which prevents one party from fulfilling the contract. The major difference between the two doctrines is that while impossibility excuses performance where the contractual duty cannot physically be performed, the doctrine of impracticability comes into play where performance is still physically possible, but would be extremely burdensome for the party whose performance is due. Thus, impossibility is an objective condition, whereas impracticability is a subjective condition for a court to determine.

Typically, the test U.S. courts use for impracticability is as follows (with a few variations among different jurisdictions):

1. There must be an occurrence of a condition, the nonoccurrence of which was a basic assumption of the contract,
2. The occurrence must make performance extremely expensive or difficult
3. This difficulty was not anticipated by the parties to the contract (note: some jurisdictions require that there be no measure within the contract itself to allocate risk between the parties)

== Restatement of Contracts ==
Section 261 of the Restatement (Second) of Contracts does not explicitly define the scope of what is considered impracticable, as it is a fairly subjective and fact-intensive test for the courts. Generally, courts do not consider events such as an increase in price or costs beyond a normal range to allow for discharge of duties on grounds of impracticability, as such events are normally foreseeable risks of fixed-price contracts.

== Uniform Commercial Code ==
Section 2-615 of the Uniform Commercial Code deals with impracticability in the context of sales of goods, and introduces some additional constraints on the parties. A party whose ability to perform his obligations has only been partially affected must allocate production and delivery among his customers in a manner which is fair and reasonable, affording each of them with partial performance, and must notify all purchasers that there will be delay, partial delivery, or non-delivery. This is similar in some respects to the doctrine of general average in admiralty law.

According to note 4 under UCC 2–615, increased cost alone does not excuse performance unless the rise in cost is due to some unforeseen contingency which alters the nature of performance. It further explains that a change in market conditions resulting in a rise or drop in prices is not sufficient to claim impracticability because the parties assumed that risk when the contract was made. The comments indicate that contingencies such as war, embargo, crop failures, or a failure of a major source of supply that causes the market change or prevents a seller from obtaining supplies necessary for his performance would justify a claim of impracticability.

== See also ==
- Force majeure
- Impossibility of performance and frustration of purpose, two related doctrines
