= Force majeure =

Suspension of contractual obligations during extreme circumstances

In contract law, force majeure (/ˌfɔːrs məˈʒɜːr/ FORSS mə-ZHUR; French: [fɔʁs maʒœʁ]) (French; literally, “superior force”) is a common clause in contracts which essentially frees both parties from liability or obligation when an extraordinary event or circumstance beyond the control of the parties prevents fulfillment of the contract. Such events can include war, labor strike, riot, crime, epidemic, extreme weather or natural disaster, or sudden legal change. Force majeure often includes events described as acts of God, though such events remain legally distinct from the clause itself. In practice, most force majeure clauses do not entirely excuse a party's non-performance but suspend it for the duration of the force majeure.

Force majeure is generally intended to include occurrences beyond the reasonable control of a party, and therefore would not cover:

- Any result of the negligence or malfeasance of a party, which has a materially adverse effect on the ability of such party to perform its obligations.
- Any result of the usual and natural consequences of external forces. To illuminate this distinction, take the example of an outdoor public event abruptly called off:
  - If the cause for cancellation is ordinary predictable rain, this is most probably not force majeure.
  - If the cause is a flash flood that damages the venue or makes the event hazardous to attend, then this almost certainly is force majeure, other than where the venue was on a known flood plain or the area of the venue was known to be subject to torrential rain.
  - Some causes might be arguable borderline cases (for instance, if unusually heavy rain occurred, rendering the event significantly more difficult, but not impossible, to safely hold or attend); these must be assessed in light of the circumstances.
- Any circumstances that are specifically contemplated (included) in the contract—for example, if the contract for the outdoor event specifically permits or requires cancellation in the event of rain.

Under international law, it refers to an irresistible force or unforeseen event beyond the control of a state, making it materially impossible to fulfill an international obligation. Accordingly, it is related to the concept of a state of emergency.

Force majeure in any given situation is controlled by the law governing the contract, rather than general concepts of force majeure. Contracts often specify what constitutes force majeure via a clause in the agreement. So, the liability is decided per contract and neither by statute nor by principles of general law. The first step to assess whether—and how—force majeure applies to any particular contract is to ascertain the law of the country (state) which governs the contract.

== Purpose ==
Time-critical and other sensitive contracts may be drafted to limit the shield of this clause where a party does not take reasonable steps (or specific precautions) to prevent or limit the effects of the outside interference, either when they become likely or when they actually occur. A force majeure may work to excuse all or part of the obligations of one or both parties. For example, a strike might prevent timely delivery of goods, but not timely payment for the portion delivered.

A force majeure may also be the overpowering force itself, which prevents the fulfillment of a contract. In that instance, it is actually the impossibility or impracticability defenses.

In the military, "force majeure" has a slightly different meaning. It refers to an event, either external or internal, that happens to a vessel or aircraft that allows it to enter normally restricted areas without penalty. An example would be the Hainan Island incident, where a U.S. Navy aircraft landed at a Chinese military airbase after a collision with a Chinese fighter in April 2001. Under the principle of force majeure, the aircraft was allowed to land without interference. Similarly, the 2023 Chinese balloon incident, in which a Chinese surveillance balloon was discovered in U.S. air space, the Chinese government stated that this "was entirely an accident caused by force majeure".

The importance of the force majeure clause in a contract, particularly one of any length in time, cannot be overstated as it relieves a party from an obligation under the contract (or suspends that obligation). What is permitted to be a force majeure event or circumstance can be the source of much controversy in the negotiation of a contract and a party should generally resist any attempt by the other party to include something that should, fundamentally, be at the risk of that other party. For example, in a coal-supply agreement, the mining company may seek to have "geological risk" included as a force majeure event; however, the mining company should be doing extensive exploration and analysis of its geological reserves and should not even be negotiating a coal-supply agreement if it cannot take the risk that there may be a geological limit to its coal supply from time to time. The outcome of that negotiation, of course, depends on the relative bargaining power of the parties and there will be cases where force majeure clauses can be used by a party effectively to escape liability for bad performance.

Because of the different interpretations of force majeure across legal systems, it is common for contracts to include specific definitions of force majeure, particularly at the international level. Some systems limit force majeure to an Act of God (such as floods, earthquakes, hurricanes, etc.) but exclude human or technical failures (such as acts of war, terrorist activities, labor disputes, or interruption or failure of electricity or communications systems). The advisory point is in drafting of contract make distinction between act of God and other shape of force majeure.

As a consequence, force majeure in areas prone to natural disaster requires a definition of the magnitude of the event for which force majeure could be considered as such in a contract. As an example, in a highly seismic area a contract could establish a technical definition of the amplitude of motion at the site, based for example on probability of occurrence studies. This parameter or parameters would later be monitored at the construction site (with a commonly agreed procedure). An earthquake could be a small shaking or damaging event. The occurrence of an earthquake does not imply the occurrence of damage or disruption. For small and moderate events it is reasonable to establish requirements for the contract processes; for large events it is not always feasible or economical to do so. Concepts such as 'damaging earthquake' in force majeure clauses do not help to clarify disruption, especially in areas where there are no other reference structures or most structures are not seismically safe.

== Common law ==
=== Hong Kong ===
When force majeure has not been provided for in the contract (or the relevant event does not fall within the scope of the force majeure clause), and a supervening event prevents performance, it will be a breach of contract. The law of frustration will be the sole remaining course available to the party in default to end the contract. If the failure to perform the contract deprives the innocent party of substantially the whole benefit of the contract it will be a repudiatory breach, entitling the innocent party to terminate the contract and claim damages for that repudiatory breach.

=== England and Wales ===
As interpreted by English courts, the phrase force majeure has a more extensive meaning than "act of God" or vis major. Judges have agreed that strikes and breakdowns of machinery, though normally not included in vis major, are included in force majeure. However, in the case of machinery breakdown, negligent lack of maintenance may negate claims of force majeure, as maintenance or its lack is within the owner's sphere of control.

The term cannot, however, be extended to cover delays caused by bad weather, football matches, or a funeral: the English case of Matsoukis v. Priestman & Co (1915) held that "these are the usual incidents interrupting work, and the defendants, in making their contract, no doubt took them into account. ... The words 'force majeure' are not words which we generally find in an English contract. They are taken from the Code Napoleon, and they were inserted by this Romanian gentleman or by his advisers, who were no doubt familiar with their use on the Continent." In Hackney Borough Council v. Dore (1922) it was held that "The expression means some physical or material restraint and does not include a reasonable fear or apprehension of such a restraint."

=== India ===
In re Dharnrajmal Gobindram v. Shamji Kalidas [All India Reporter 1961 Supreme Court (of India) 1285], it was held that "An analysis of ruling on the subject shows that reference to the expression is made where the intention is to save the defaulting party from the consequences of anything over which he had no control."

Even if a force majeure clause covers the relevant supervening event, the party unable to perform will not have the benefit of the clause where performance merely become (1) more difficult, (2) more expensive, and/or (3) less profitable.

=== United States ===
For example, parties in the United States have used the COVID-19 pandemic as a force majeure in an attempt to escape contractual liability by applying the elements of an (1) unforeseeable event, (2) outside of the parties' control, that (3) renders performance impossible or impractical. Though force majeure events are generally thought to include natural events like tornadoes and often unforeseeable man-made events like labor strikes, economic phenomena such as the 2021–2023 Inflation Surge have additionally impacted force majeure provisions in leasing and other real estate contracts to include delays or excuses from performing contractual obligations due to increased costs from rising inflation and rising interest rates.

== Civil law ==
=== France ===
For a defendant to invoke force majeure in French law, the event proposed as force majeure must pass three tests:

1. Externality: The defendant must have nothing to do with the event's happening.
2. Unpredictability: If the event could be foreseen, the defendant is obligated to have prepared for it. Being unprepared for a foreseeable event leaves the defendant culpable. This standard is very strictly applied:
  - CE 9 April 1962, "Chais d'Armagnac": The Council of State adjudged that, since a flood had occurred 69 years before the one that caused the damage at issue, the latter flood was predictable.
  - Administrative Court of Grenoble, 19 June 1974, "Dame Bosvy": An avalanche was judged to be predictable since another had occurred around 50 years before.
3. Irresistibility: The consequences of the event must have been unpreventable.

Other events that are candidates for force majeure in French law are hurricanes and earthquakes. Force majeure is a defense against liability and is applicable throughout French law. Force majeure and cas fortuit are distinct notions in French law.

=== Argentina ===
In Argentina, force majeure (fuerza mayor and caso fortuito) is defined by the Civil Code of Argentina in Article 512, and regulated in Article 513. According to these articles, force majeure is defined by the following characteristics:

- an event that could not have been foreseen or if it could, an event that could not be resisted. From these, it can be said that some acts of nature can be predicted, but if their consequences cannot be resisted it can be considered force majeure.
- externality: the victim was not related directly or indirectly to the causes of the event, e.g., if the act was a fire, or a strike.
- unpredictability: the event must had been originated after the cause of the obligation.
- irresistibility: the victim cannot by any means overcome the effects.

In Argentina, Act of God can be used in Civil Responsibility regarding contractual or noncontractual obligations.

== Hybrid law systems ==
=== Philippines ===
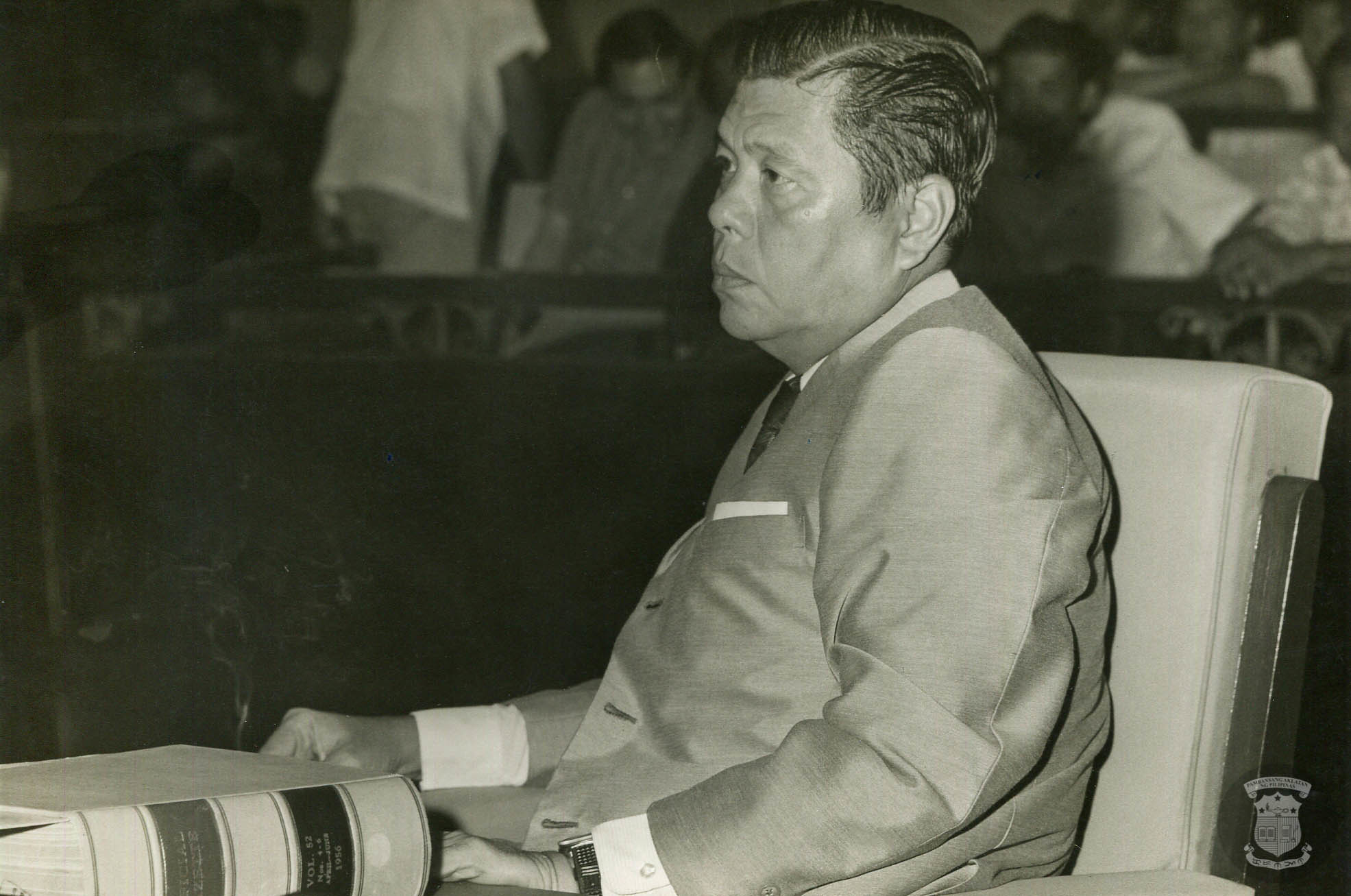
Lawyer Jose W. Diokno, who argued for the standards of fortuitous events

As the oldest state with a size of over 300,000 sq km to integrate the two legal systems, the Philippines also has its own unique interpretation of force majeure events. Under the Civil Code in Article 1174,

Except in cases specified by the law, or when it is otherwise declared by stipulation, or when the nature of the obligation requires the assumption of risk, no person shall be responsible for those events which, could not be foreseen, or which, though foreseen were inevitable.

Fortuitous events must not be caused by man but by nature. Therefore, economic crises are not considered as force majeure events that allows a debtor to be free of his obligation or debt. However such crises as an effect of wars such as World War II are considered as force majeure events as stated in Sagrada v. Nacoco (G.R. No. L-3756). The landmark case on this article and event is the case of Nakpil & Sons v. CA (G.R. No. L-47851). In this case, the Philippine Bar Association (PBA) building was the only building destroyed on Arzobispo St., Intramuros, Manila during an earthquake in 1968. The PBA, through the Jose W. Diokno Law Office, led by Sen. Diokno himself, sued Nakpil & Sons as well as the contractor of the building, United Construction Company, Inc., and won in the trial court. The case was merely reiterated and affirmed by the Court of Appeals. Finally in 1986 the case was decided with finality by the Supreme Court. The Court mentioned the four requisites, by breaking down Article 1174. These are still the requisites used in Philippine courts today. These requisites are:

1. that the event was independent of the debtor's will;
2. that the event was unforeseeable or if foreseeable, it was inevitable;
3. that the fulfillment of the obligation becomes impossible to accomplish for the debtor; and
4. that the debtor had no participation in the non-performance of the obligation or the damage caused to the creditor.

In doing so, the Supreme Court ruled that there is no fortuitous event, after also observing certain problems in construction such as measurement deficiencies and poor foundations.

== UNIDROIT Principles ==
Article 7.1.7 of the UNIDROIT Principles of International Commercial Contracts provides for a form of force majeure similar, but not identical, to the common law and civil law concepts of the term: relief from performance is granted "if that party proves that the non-performance was due to an impediment beyond its control and that it could not reasonably be expected to have taken the impediment into account at the time of the conclusion of the contract or to have avoided or overcome it or its consequences." The contract may extend for a time after the event occurred, and sufficient actions must be taken to mitigate the force majeure's effects on the contract for that time.

== See also ==
- Frustration of purpose – Defence in contract law
- Hardship clause
- Hell or high water clause – Contract clause mandating payments
- Mutual assent – Legal term
- Substantial performance
- Clausula rebus sic stantibus – Legal doctrine

== Sources ==
- Mitra's Legal & Commercial Dictionary. Pages 350–351. 4th Edn. Eastern Law House. ISBN 978-81-7177-015-1.
- International Business Law and Its Environment. Schaffer, Agusti, Earle. Page 154. 7th Edn. 2008. South-Western Legal Studies in Business Academic. ISBN 978-0-324-64967-3.
