= Jacob & Youngs, Inc. v. Kent =

Jacob & Youngs v. Kent
- Court: New York Court of Appeals
- Full case name: Jacob & Youngs, Incorporated, v. George E. Kent
- Argued: December 1 1920
- Decided: January 25 1921
- Citation: 230 N.Y. 239; 129 N.E. 889; 1921 N.Y. LEXIS 828; 23 A.L.R. 1429

Case history
- Prior history: Judgment for plaintiff, New York County Supreme Court; reversed on appeal, 175 N.Y.S. 281 (N.Y. App. Div. 1919)

Holding
- Owner of a home could not recover from the construction company as a result of a breach of contract due to the constructor having completed substantial performance. New York Supreme Court Appellate Division affirmed as modified.

Court membership
- Chief judge: Frank H. Hiscock
- Associate judges: Benjamin Cardozo, Chester B. McLaughlin, John W. Hogan, Frederick E. Crane, Cuthbert W. Pound, William S. Andrews

Case opinions
- Majority: Cardozo, joined by Hiscock, Hogan, Crane
- Dissent: McLaughlin, joined by Pound, Andrews

Laws applied
- The court applied the rules of substantial performance, material and immaterial breach, and contract remedies.

Jacob & Youngs, Inc. v. Kent, 230 N.Y. 239 (1921) is an American contract law case of the New York Court of Appeals with a majority opinion by Judge Benjamin N. Cardozo. The case addresses several contract principles including applying the doctrine of substantial performance in preventing forfeiture and determining the appropriate remedy following a partial or defective performance.

== Facts ==
Jacob & Youngs, Inc. ("Jacob") was a general contractor that built a country residence for Kent at a cost of about $77,000. Jacob brought suit against Kent to recover an unpaid balance of $3,483.46. Kent learned that some of the piping, instead of being made by the Reading Iron Company ("Reading Pipe"), was made by the Cohoes Rolling Mill Company ("Cohoes Pipe"), which was contrary to the explicit terms in the contract. Kent demanded that the piping be replaced with Reading Pipe. The pipe replacement, however, meant the demolition of the completed structure at a substantial expense to Jacob. Jacob left the work untouched and asked for a certificate that the final payment was due claiming that the pipes installed were equivalent quality to Reading Pipe.

Kent refused to supply the certificate and Jacob subsequently filed suit to recover damages. The trial court ruled in favor of Kent, which was reversed on appeal, and a new trial was ordered.

== Majority Opinion ==
Judge Cardozo writing for the majority found that Jacob substantially performed under the contract and was entitled to the unpaid balance less any damages the court found. Cardozo began by clarifying that courts never say that one can fulfill their contract obligations by anything less than full performance. Courts do, however, allow a breach of a condition not always to be followed by forfeiture. Cardozo looked at the condition of installing Reading pipe and examined whether the literal fulfillment of installing Reading pipe was a condition to Kent's payment. Upon review, Cardozo found the reason for Reading pipe being specified in the agreement was not meant to actually specify Reading-brand pipe, but instead was meant to require that galvanized steel pipe be installed, and not cast iron (which was the norm at the time). Based on this understanding/interpretation of the agreement, Cardozo found Jacob to have substantially performed his duties under the contract—installing galvanized steel pipe—and his breach to therefore be immaterial.

The court concluded that the measure of damages in this case to not be the cost of replacement (i.e., the cost to replace the Cohoes pipe with Reading pipe), but the difference in the value of the property with the installed Cohoes piping, which was nominal or nothing. A non-breaching party is generally entitled to money that will permit them to complete performance unless the cost of completion is grossly and unfairly out of proportion to the good attained. Due to Jacob's substantial expense in replacing the piping, and the primary purpose of the contract having been performed, "difference in value" was the appropriate method to calculate damages in this case.

"The rule that gives a remedy in cases of substantial performance with compensation of defects of trivial or inappreciable importance, has been developed by the courts as an instrument of justice. The measure of the allowance must be shaped to the same end."

== Dissent ==
In the dissent, Judge McLaughlin concluded that Jacob did not perform its contract with Kent. He argued that the lower court was correct in directing the verdict for Kent. Jacob expressly agreed that all piping in the home should be Reading pipe, and Kent had a right to contract for what he wanted. Jacob made no explanation on why Reading pipe was not used nor made any effort to show the cost of removal. Kent agreed to pay only upon the condition that the Reading pipe was installed, and McLaughlin concluded that Kent should not be required to pay unless the condition was performed. Thus, the doctrine of substantial performance does not apply to this particular situation.

== Significance ==
Jacob & Youngs created an analytical framework for determining when a failure to perform amounts to an excuse for the non-breaching party to perform its obligations. When a failure to perform a promise is considered substantial, the promise will be construed as a condition of the other party's obligation. When the failure to perform is considered insubstantial, the promise will be deemed independent and not a condition of the other party's obligation to perform. The question in Jacob & Youngs was how to determine when a particular failure to perform was significant or insignificant. Judge Cardozo outlined three factors in helping determine whether a breach is significant enough to exclude a party from performing. Those factors included (1) the degree of harm to the breaching party (whether the breaching party will suffer inequitable forfeiture), (2) the degree of harm caused by the breach on the reasonable expectations of the non-breaching party, and (3) good faith of the breaching party.

== See also ==
- Hoenig v Isaacs
- Bolton v Mahadeva
- English contract law
