= Sumpter v Hedges =

English contract case concerning substantial performance and restitution

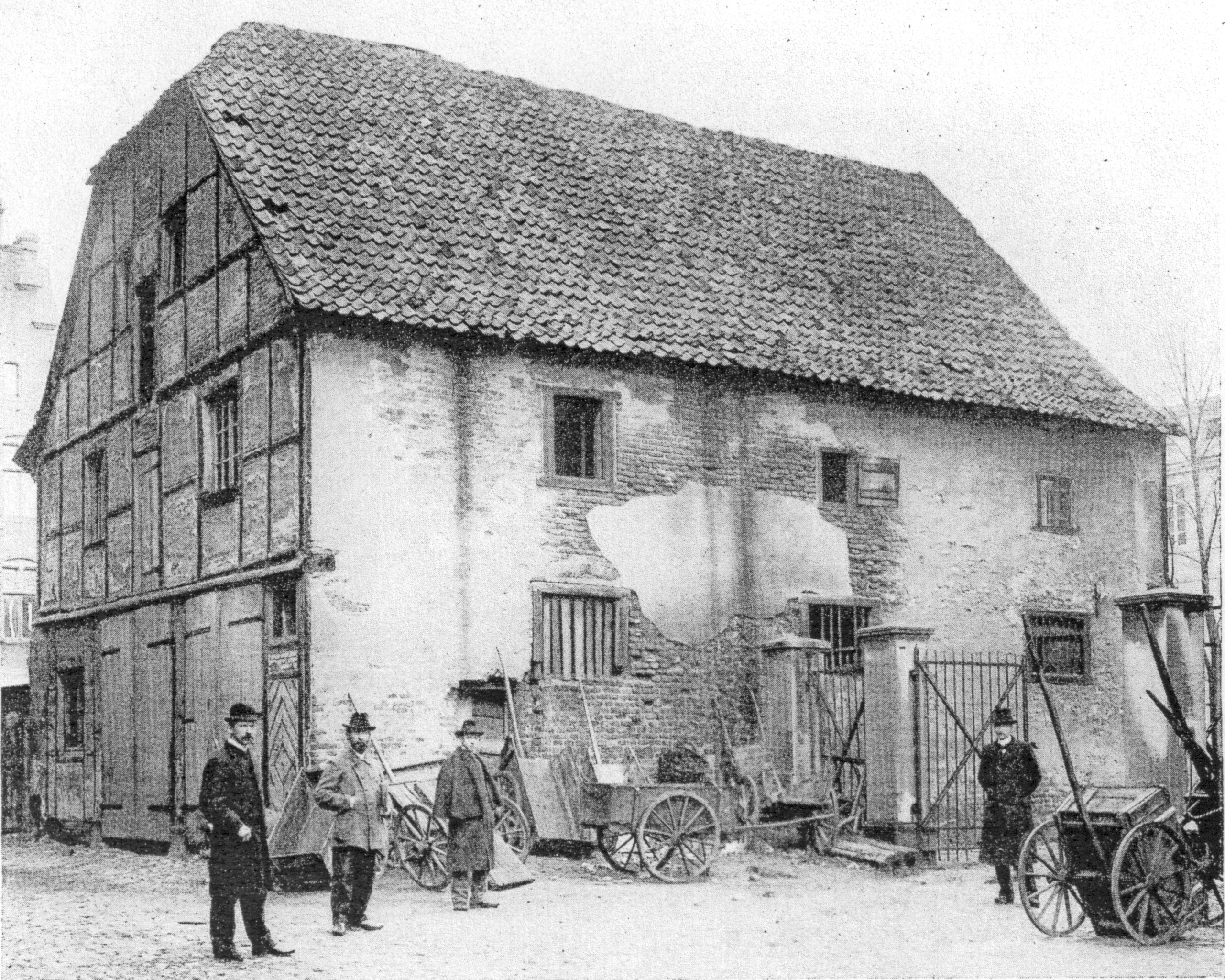
- Court: Court of Appeal
- Decided: 18 March 1898
- Citation: [1898] 1 QB 673, 67 LJQB 545, 46 WR 454, 42 Sol Jo 362, 78 LT 378

Case opinions
- AL Smith LJ, Chitty LJ and Collins LJ

Keywords
- quantum meruit, entire obligation, restitution for unjust enrichment, substantial performance

Sumpter v Hedges [1898] 1 QB 673 is an English contract law case concerning substantial performance of a contract and restitution for unjust enrichment.

== Facts ==
Mr Sumpter was a builder. He had a contract to build two houses and stables for Mr Hedges for £560. He did work valued at £333 and said he had to stop because he had no more money. Substantial payments on account had in fact been made to the builder. Hedges finished the building, using materials which Sumpter had left behind. Sumpter sued for the outstanding money.

Bruce J found that Mr Sumpter had abandoned the contract, and said he could obtain money for the value of the materials but nothing for the work.

== Judgment ==
The Court of Appeal found that Mr Sumpter had abandoned the building work and emphasised that it left Mr Hedges without any choice of whether to adopt the work. It held that Mr Hedges had to pay for the building materials that he used, but did not need to reimburse Mr Sumpter for the half-built structures. AL Smith LJ gave the leading judgment:

In this case the plaintiff, a builder, entered into a contract to build two houses and stables on the defendant's land for a lump sum. When the buildings were still in an unfinished state the plaintiff informed the defendant that he had no money, and was not going on with the work any more. The learned judge has found as a fact that he abandoned the contract. Under such circumstances, what is a building owner to do? He cannot keep the buildings on his land in an unfinished state for ever. The law is that, where there is a contract to do work for a lump sum, until the work is completed the price of it cannot be recovered. Therefore the plaintiff could not recover on the original contract. It is suggested however that the plaintiff was entitled to recover for the work he did on a quantum meruit. But, so that may be, there must be evidence of a fresh contract to pay for the work already done. With regard to that, the case of Munro v Butt appears to be exactly in point. That case decides that, unless the building owner does something from which a new contract can be inferred to pay for the work already done, the plaintiff in such a case as this cannot recover on a quantum meruit. In the case of Lysaght v Pearson, to which we have been referred, the case of Munro v Butt does not appear to have been referred to. There the plaintiff had contracted to erect on the defendant's land two corrugated iron roofs. When he had completed one of them, he does not seem to have said that he abandoned the contract, but merely that he would not go on unless the defendant paid him for what he had already done. The defendant thereupon proceeded to erect for himself the second roof. The Court of Appeal held that there was in that case something from which a new contract might be inferred to pay for the work done by the plaintiff. That is not this case. In the case of Whitaker v Dunn there was a contract to erect a laundry on defendant's land, and the laundry erected was not in accordance with the contract, but the official referee held that the plaintiff could recover on a quantum meruit. The case came before a Divisional Court, consisting of Lord Coleridge CJ and myself, and we said that the decision in Munro v Butt applied, and there being no circumstances to justify an inference of a fresh contract the plaintiff must fail. My brother Collins thinks that that case went to the Court of Appeal, and that he argued it there, and the Court affirmed the decision of the Queen's Bench Division. I think the appeal must be dismissed.

Chitty LJ concurred.

I am of the same opinion. The plaintiff had contracted to erect certain buildings for a lump sum. When the work was only partly done, the plaintiff said that he could not go on with it, and the judge has found that he abandoned the contract. The position therefore was that the defendant found his land with unfinished buildings upon it, and he thereupon completed the work. That is no evidence from which the inference can be drawn that he entered into a fresh contract to pay for the work done by the plaintiff. If we held that the plaintiff could recover, we should in my opinion be overruling Cutter v Powell, and a long series of cases in which it has been decided that there must in such a case be some evidence of a new contract to enable the plaintiff to recover on a quantum meruit. There was nothing new in the decision in Pattinson v Luckley, but Bramwell B. there pointed out with his usual clearness that in the case of a building erected upon land the mere fact that the defendant remains in possession of his land is no evidence upon which an inference of a new contract can be founded. He says: “In the case of goods sold and delivered, it is easy to shew a contract from the retention of the goods; but that is not so where work is done on real property.” I think the learned judge was quite right in holding that in this case there was no evidence from which a fresh contract to pay for the work done could be inferred.

Collins LJ concurred.

I agree. I think the case is really concluded by the finding of the learned judge to the effect that the plaintiff had abandoned the contract. If the plaintiff had merely broken his contract in some way so as not to give the defendant the right to treat him as having abandoned the contract, and the defendant had then proceeded to finish the work himself, the plaintiff might perhaps have been entitled to sue on a quantum meruit on the ground that the defendant had taken the benefit of the work done. But that is not the present case. There are cases in which, though the plaintiff has abandoned the performance of a contract, it is possible for him to raise the inference of a new contract to pay for the work done on a quantum meruit from the defendant's having taken the benefit of that work, but, so that may be done, the circumstances must be such as to give an option to the defendant to take or not to take the benefit of the work done. It is only where the circumstances are such as to give that option that there is any evidence on which to ground the inference of a new contract. Where, as in the case of work done on land, the circumstances are such as to give the defendant no option whether he will take the benefit of the work or not, then one must look to other facts than the mere taking the benefit of the work to ground the inference of a new contract. In this case I see no other facts on which such an inference can be founded. The mere fact that a defendant is in possession of what he cannot help keeping, or even has done work upon it, affords no ground for such an inference. He is not bound to keep unfinished a building which in an incomplete state would be a nuisance on his land. I am therefore of opinion that the plaintiff was not entitled to recover for the work which he had done. I feel clear that the case of Whitaker v Dunn, to which reference has been made, was the case which as counsel I argued in the Court of Appeal, and in which the Court dismissed the appeal on the ground that the case was concluded by Munro v Butt.

== See also ==
- Cutter v Powell (1795) 6 TR 320; 101 ER 573
- Hoenig v Isaacs [1952] 2 All ER 176
- Bolton v Mahadeva [1972] 2 All ER 1322
