= Hardship clause =

Hardship clause is a clause in a contract that is intended to cover cases in which unforeseen events occur that fundamentally alter the equilibrium of a contract resulting in an excessive burden being placed on one of the parties involved.

Hardship clauses typically recognize that parties must perform their contractual obligations even if events have rendered performance more onerous than would reasonably have been anticipated at the time of the conclusion of the contract.

However, if continued performance has become excessively burdensome because of an event beyond a party's reasonable control that it could not reasonably have been expected to have taken into account, the clause can obligate the parties to negotiate alternative contractual terms to allow for the consequences of the event reasonably.

== Relation to force majeure ==
The hardship clause is sometimes used in relation to force majeure, particularly because they share similar features and they both cater to situations of changed circumstances. The difference between the two concepts is that hardship is the performance of the disadvantaged party becoming much more burdensome but still possible. Force majeure refers to a party's contractual requirements have become impossible, at least temporarily.

Hardship is a reason for a change in the contractual program of the parties. The aim of the parties remains to implement the contract. Force majeure, however, is situated in the context of nonperformance and deals with the suspension or termination of the contract.

== See also ==
- Clausula rebus sic stantibus
- Hell or high water clause
- Impossibility of performance
