= Impossibility of performance =

In law, the impossibility of performing a contractual duty

The doctrine or principle of impossibility, impossibility of performance or impossibility of performance of contract is a doctrine in contract law, and in this context, the "impossibility defense" is a defense offered against a claim for nonperformance. (Note: For the impossibility defense in a criminal law context, see Impossibility defense.)

In contract law, impossibility is an excuse for the nonperformance of duties under a contract, based on a change in circumstances (or the discovery of preexisting circumstances), the nonoccurrence of which was an underlying assumption of the contract, that makes performance of the contract literally impossible.

For example, if Ebenezer contracts to pay Erasmus £100 to paint his house on October 1, but the house burns to the ground before the end of September, Ebenezer is excused from his duty to pay Erasmus the £100, and Erasmus is excused from his duty to paint Ebenezer's house; however, Erasmus may still be able to sue under the theory of unjust enrichment for the value of any benefit he conferred on Ebenezer before his house burned down.

Sometimes it is impossible to perform a contract as a result of war.

The parties to a contract may choose to ignore impossibility by inserting a hell or high water clause, which mandates that payments continue even if completion of the contract becomes physically impossible.

== Australia ==
Frustration usually involves impossibility of performance. As to whether the non-existence of the subject matter of a contract constitutes (initial) impossibility of performance, see McRae v Commonwealth Disposals Commission. Cf. Res extincta.

== England and Wales ==
A contract may be frustrated by impossibility of performance.

In 1997, Downes said that impossibility and impracticability were separate in England and Wales, and that impracticability was not usually found to result in frustration.

The English case that established the doctrine of impossibility at common law is Taylor v Caldwell.

== New Zealand ==
Wilkins and Davies Construction Co Ltd v Geraldine Corporation [1958] NZLR 985 is relevant.

== South Africa ==
A contract may be ended by supervening impossibility of performance.

== United States ==
At common law, for the defense of "impossibility" to be raised, performance must not merely be difficult or unexpectedly costly for one party, there must be no way for it to actually be accomplished. However, in the United States it is beginning to be recognized that "impossibility" under this doctrine can also exist when the contemplated performance can be done but only at an excessive and unreasonable cost, i.e., commercial impracticability. On the other hand, some US sources see "impossibility" and impracticability as being related but separate defenses.

== See also ==
- Contract law
- Force majeure
- Hardship clause
- Hell or high water clause
- Mutual assent
- Ultra posse nemo obligatur
