= Wiluszynski v London Borough of Tower Hamlets =

Wiluszynski v Tower Hamlets LBC
- Court: Court of Appeal of England and Wales
- Decided: 26 April 1989
- Citation: [1989] ICR 493; [1989] IRLR 258

Case opinions
- Nicholls LJ

Keywords
- Employment contract

Wiluszynski v London Borough of Tower Hamlets [1989] ICR 439 is a UK labour law case concerning the contract of employment. It held that if an employment was only partly performed due to a strike, this could be construed as not completing an entire obligation, so that even if an employer has received much more value, they need to pay nothing.

This case has been criticised on the ground that it fails to give adequate weight to the context of employment contracts, which differ from commercial contracts, particularly in light of developments in the law of unjust enrichment and the decision of Autoclenz Ltd v Belcher.

== Facts ==
Mr Marek Wilusyzynski was a member of the trade union, the National and Local Government Officers Association, whose strike plan was to refuse to answer enquiries from London Borough of Tower Hamlets council members. This was only a very small proportion of his duties as a housing officer, because he dealt mainly with complaints directly from tenants. He made up three hours of work after five weeks of industrial action. Yet the council had warned that no payment would be made if work was not performed. John Hendy and Jeremy McMullen for Marek.

The first instance court said there had been substantial performance of the job, and management acquiesced in the variation.

== Judgement ==
Nicholls LJ in the Court of Appeal held that no payment was due to the striking workers, because they had only partly performed an entire obligation of their contracts.

The contrary conclusion would mean that the defendant would be obliged to continue to employ and pay the plaintiff even though part of the work required of him and others in his position would not be done. That cannot be right.

In my view, however, termination of the contract is not the only remedy available to an employer in such circumstances. A buyer of goods is entitled to decline to accept goods tendered to him which do not conform to a condition in the contract, without necessarily terminating the contract altogether. So with services… He can hold himself out as continuing to be ready and willing to carry out the contract of employment, and to accept from the employee work as agreed and to pay him for that work as agreed, while declining to accept or pay for part only of the agreed work...

The council did not wish to take any steps, and it did not take any steps, physically to prevent the plaintiff and the other estate officers concerned from remaining at their desks… But a person is not treated by the law as having chosen to accept that which is forced down his throat despite his objections.

== See also ==
- UK labour law
- Employment contract in English law
- Autoclenz Ltd v Belcher
- Hoenig v Isaacs
