= Wood v. Lucy, Lady Duff-Gordon =

1917 New York contract law case

- Court: New York Court of Appeals
- Full case name: Otis F. Wood v. Lucy, Lady Duff-Gordon
- Argued: November 14 1917
- Decided: December 4 1917
- Citation: 222 N.Y. 88; 118 N.E. 214

Case history
- Prior history: Defendant's motion to dismiss denied, Sup. Ct., Special Term; rev'd, 177 A.D. 624 (1917)

Holding
- A promise to represent the interests of a party constitutes sufficient consideration to require enforcement of a contract based on that promise. Appellate Division reversed.

Court membership
- Chief judge: Frank H. Hiscock
- Associate judges: Emory A. Chase, William H. Cuddeback, Benjamin N. Cardozo, Frederick E. Crane, Chester B. McLaughlin, William Shankland Andrews

Case opinions
- Majority: Cardozo, joined by Cuddeback, Mclaughlin, Andrews
- Dissent: (without separate opinions) Hiscock, Chase, Crane

Wood v. Lucy, Lady Duff-Gordon, 222 N.Y. 88, 118 N.E. 214 (1917), is a New York state contract case in which the New York Court of Appeals held Lucy, Lady Duff-Gordon, to a contract that assigned the sole right to market her name to her advertising agent.

== Facts ==
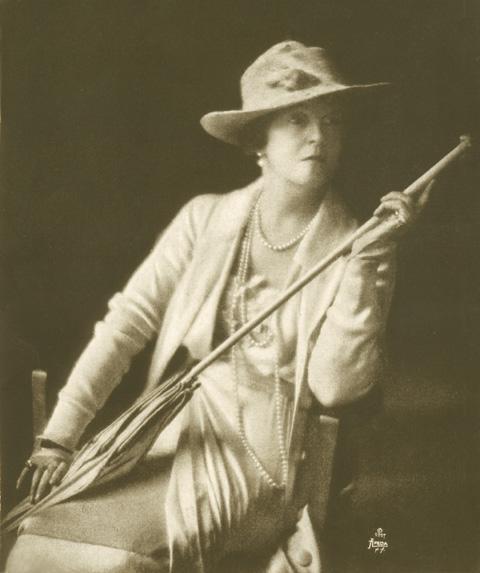
Lady Duff Gordon as she appeared in 1917

The plaintiff, Otis F. Wood, was a top New York advertising agent whose clients included major commercial clients as well as celebrities. The defendant, Lucy, Lady Duff-Gordon, also known as "Lucile" (her couture label), was a leading fashion designer for high society as well as the stage and early silent cinema, and a survivor of the 1912 sinking of the RMS Titanic.

Lady Duff-Gordon signed a contract with Wood giving him the exclusive right to market garments and other products bearing her endorsement in the United States for one year beginning on April 1, 1915. This contract gave Lady Duff Gordon half of all revenues thus derived. Wood's only duties under the contract were to account for monies received and secure patents as necessary, but if Wood did not work to market the clothes, no monies would be received and no patents would become necessary. Around the same time, Duff-Gordon came up with an idea to market a line of clothing "for the masses", endorsing products sold by Sears Roebuck.

Wood sued, arguing that the agreement with Sears breached their exclusivity contract. Duff-Gordon argued that no valid contract existed: since Wood had not made an express promise to do anything, the agreement was invalid and could not be enforced for lack of consideration. The trial court found for Wood but was reversed by the Appellate Division, an intermediate appellate court. Wood then appealed to the Court of Appeals of New York, the state's highest court, which then considered whether an agreement with a promise not expressly stated still required performance of that promise given the context of the agreement.

== Judgment ==
The Court, in an opinion by Judge Benjamin N. Cardozo, made new law by determining that a promise to exclusively represent the interests of a party constituted sufficient consideration to require enforcement of an unstated duty to use reasonable efforts based on that promise. Cardozo wrote of the arrangement, "[a] promise may be lacking, and yet the whole writing may be 'instinct with an obligation,' imperfectly expressed." "The acceptance of the exclusive agency", he found, "was an assumption of its duties" and "the law has outgrown its primitive stage of formalism when the precise word was the sovereign talisman...it takes a broader view today." Based on this reasoning, the Appellate Division was reversed and the trial court's decision reinstated. The case, with a relatively short and concisely written opinion, has become a staple of American and Canadian law school contracts casebooks, along with several other opinions by Cardozo.

== See also ==
- US contract law
- English contract law
- Brand ambassador
