= 1929 New York City Comptroller election =

- November 5, 1929
Nominee	Charles W. Berry	Harold G. Aron	Charles Solomon
Party	Democratic	Republican	Socialist
Popular vote	886,640	390,938	90,068
Percentage	64.68%	28.52%	6.57%
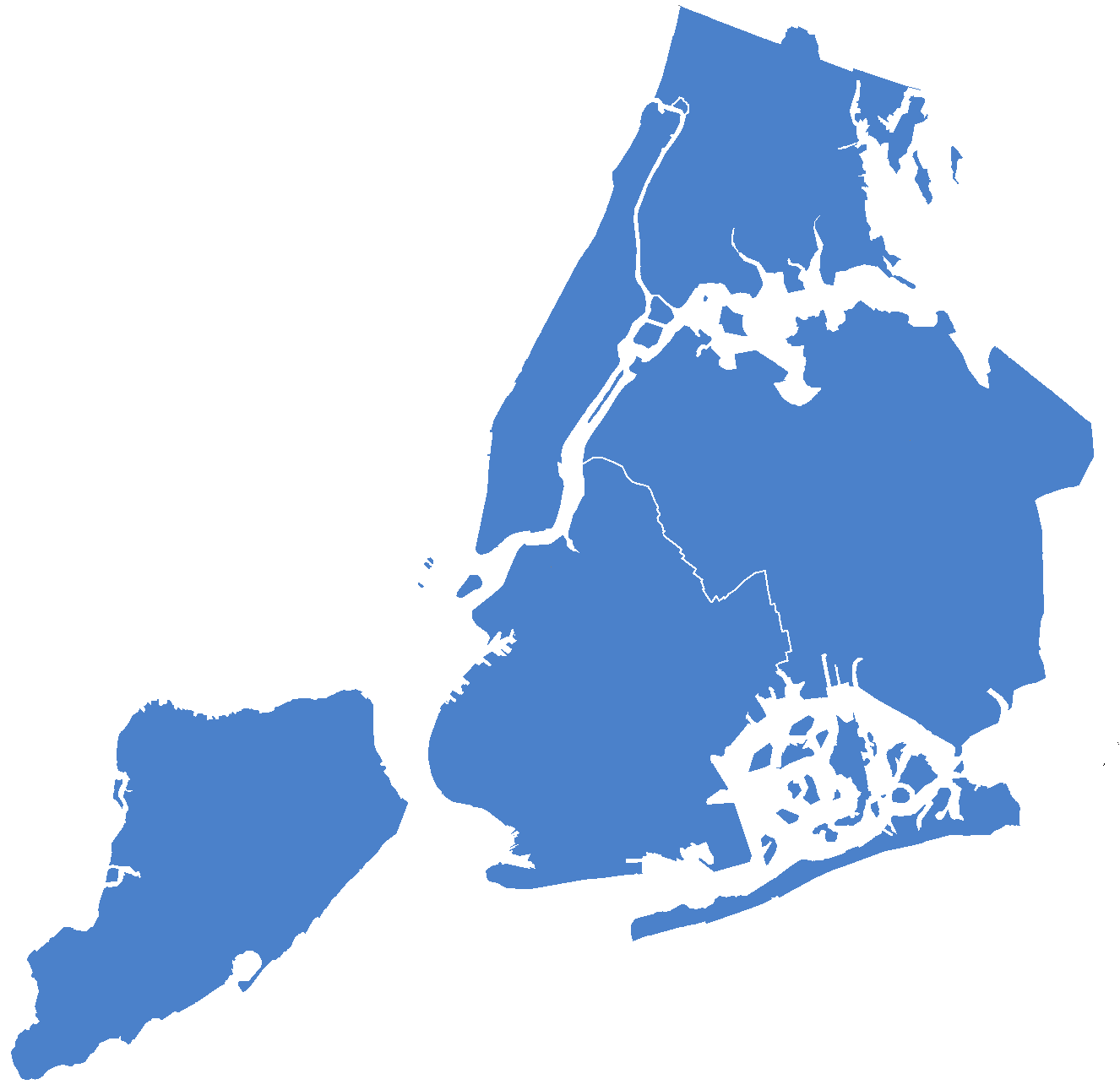
- Results by borough Berry 60–70%
Comptroller before election
Charles W. Berry
Democratic
Elected Comptroller
Charles W. Berry
Democratic

An election for the New York City Comptroller was held on November 5, 1929, the same day as other such contests as the mayoralty, aldermen, President of the Board of Aldermen, Borough presidents, and County sheriffs. Incumbent Charles W. Berry was reelected, defeating Republican candidate Harold G. Aron, Socialist candidate Charles Solomon, and Square Deal Party candidate George E. Polhemus to win reelection. Communist Otto Hall, Social Laborite August Gillhaus, and Charlotte O. Schetter of the Commonwealth Land Party also contested the election.
