= Frederick Crane =

Frederick Crane may refer to:

- Frederick Crane (Frasier), a character in the television sitcom Frasier
- Frederick E. Crane (1869–1947), American lawyer and politician from New York
- Frederick Loring Crane (1925–2016), American biochemist and recipient of the Eli Lilly Award in Biological Chemistry
