= 1920 New York state election =

1897 New York state election
- November 2, 1920

The 1920 New York state election was held on November 2, 1920, to elect the governor, the lieutenant governor, the secretary state, the state comptroller, the attorney general, the state treasurer, the state engineer, two judges of the New York Court of Appeals and a U.S. senator, as well as all members of the New York State Assembly and the New York State Senate.

== History ==
In August 1919, Judge William H. Cuddeback died, and Abram I. Elkus was appointed to fill the vacancy temporarily. Judge Frederick Collin would reach the constitutional age limit at the end of the year. Thus there were two vacancies on the Court of Appeals to be filled at the state election.

The primaries were held on September 14.

=== Republican primary ===
1920 Republican primary results
Office						
Governor	Nathan L. Miller	270,963	George F. Thompson	143,040		
Lieutenant Governor	Jeremiah Wood	265,326	William M. Bennett	123,661		
Secretary of State	John J. Lyons	274,342	Robert R. Lawson	104,325		
Comptroller	James A. Wendell	300,253	Walter Worth	73,020		
Attorney General	Charles D. Newton	365,034	(unopposed)			
Treasurer	N. Monroe Marshall	197,083	Theodore T. Baylor (Note: Theodore T. Baylor, also defeated in primary in 1918)	147,662	John P. Donohue	34,325
State Engineer	Frank M. Williams	364,429	(unopposed)			
Judge of the Court of Appeals	Emory A. Chase		(unopposed)			
Judge of the Court of Appeals	Frederick E. Crane		(unopposed)			
U.S. Senator	James W. Wadsworth, Jr.	270,084	Ella A. Boole	90,491	George Henry Payne	46,039

Republican state senator (47th District) George F. Thompson lost the primary to Miller, but ran on the Prohibition ticket, as did Temperance activist Ella A. Boole.

=== Democratic primary ===
1920 Democratic primary results
Office				
Governor	Alfred E. Smith	166,028	(unopposed)	
Lieutenant Governor	George R. Fitts	157,114	(unopposed)	
Secretary of State	Harriet May Mills	154,339	(unopposed)	
Comptroller	Charles W. Berry	155,432	(unopposed)	
Attorney General	Frank H. Mott	154,763	(unopposed)	
Treasurer	John F. Healy	156,359	(unopposed)	
State Engineer	Paul McLoud	154,076	(unopposed)	
Judge of the Court of Appeals	Abram I. Elkus			
Judge of the Court of Appeals	Frederick E. Crane		(unopposed)	
U.S. Senator	Harry C. Walker	109,995	George R. Lunn	44,226

All Prohibition and Socialist candidates were nominated unopposed in the primaries.

== Result ==
The whole Republican ticket was elected.

The incumbents Smith and Elkus were defeated. The incumbents Newton, Williams and Wadsworth were re-elected. Judges Chase and Crane moved from additional to regular seats on the Court of Appeals.

1920 state election results
Office	Republican ticket		Democratic ticket		Socialist ticket		Farmer-Labor ticket		Prohibition ticket		Socialist Labor ticket	
Governor	Nathan L. Miller	1,335,878	Alfred E. Smith	1,261,812	Joseph D. Cannon	159,804	Dudley Field Malone	69,908	George F. Thompson	35,509	John P. Quinn	5,015
Lieutenant Governor	Jeremiah Wood	1,497,964	George R. Fitts	994,638	Jessie W. Hughan	187,567	Robert E. Haffey	44,485	Edward G. Dietrich	30,901	Jeremiah D. Crowley (Note: Jeremiah D. Crowley, of Marcellus, ran also for State Engineer in 1910; for Lieutenant Governor in 1912 and 1914; and for Governor in 1916)	7,550
Secretary of State	John J. Lyons	1,614,426	Harriet May Mills (Note: Harriet May Mills, see Harriet May Mills House)	862,933	Charles W. Noonan (Note: Charles W. Noonan, ran also for Comptroller in 1914 and 1916; and for Treasurer in 1918)	199,073	William H. Auyer	32,293	Irene B. Taylor	33,531	May Phalor (Note: May Phalor, ran also in 1922)	6,236
Comptroller	James A. Wendell	1,524,527	Charles W. Berry	935,643	A. Philip Randolph	202,381	Helen Hamlin Fincke	29,955	William C. Gray	32,408	John E. DeLee	6,354
Attorney General	Charles D. Newton	1,573,943	Frank H. Mott	881,070	Darwin J. Meserole	199,529	F. R. Serri	26,728	William H. Burr (Note: William H. Burr, ran also in 1917)	35,042	John Donahue (Note: John Donahue, ran also in 1918)	8,915
Treasurer	N. Monroe Marshall	1,566,989	John F. Healy (Note: John F. Healy, state senator 1913–1914)	901,611	Hattie F. Kreuger	200,836	Joseph E. Cronk	28,227	John McKee	30,095	John A. Withers	5,784
State Engineer	Frank M. Williams	1,578,790	Paul McLoud	869,428	Vladimir Karapetoff	202,157	Charles C. Crawford	12,999	Arthur S. Light	29,578	(none)	
Judge of the Court of Appeals	Emory A. Chase	1,467,697	Abram I. Elkus	833,725	Leon A. Malkiel	218,299	Swinburne Hale	26,372	Coleridge A. Hart (Note: Coleridge Allen Hart (b. July 11, 1852 Peekskill), lawyer, of Brooklyn, ran also for Attorney General in 1889, and for the Court of Appeals in 1907, 1908, 1914, 1916 and 1917)	36,487	(none)	
Judge of the Court of Appeals	Frederick E. Crane	1,963,978	Frederick E. Crane	13,658	Jacob Axelrod	187,640	Thomas F. Dwyer	36,908	Francis E. Baldwin (Note: Francis E. Baldwin, ran also for Governor in 1894; for Chief Judge in 1897; for Attorney General in 1910; and for U.S. Senator in 1914)	31,205	(none)	
U.S. Senator	James W. Wadsworth, Jr.	1,434,393	Harry C. Walker	901,310	Jacob Panken	208,155	Rose Schneiderman	27,934	Ella A. Boole	159,623	Harry Carlson	7,822

== See also ==
- New York gubernatorial elections
- New York state elections

== Sources ==
- Primary candidates: "Primary Rivals Clash Tomorrow". The New York Times. September 13, 1920. p. 3.
- The tickets: "Nominees of All Parties for Public Office, for Election Tuesday, November 2". The New York Times. October 23, 1920. p. 14.
- Early returns: "Miller Lead, 64,014, 107 Dists. To Come". The New York Times. November 5, 1920. p. 2.
- Result: "Republican Lead up State 500,000". The New York Times. December 12, 1920. p. 1.
- Results in Manual for the Use of the State Legislature (1921; see pg. 766ff for Democratic primaries; pg. 769–774 for Republican primaries; pg. 775–798 for the general elections)
- Vote totals taken from The New York Red Book 1922
