= Cuthbert W. Pound =

American judge (1864–1935)

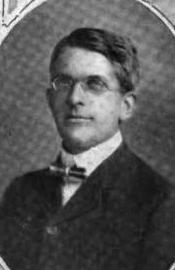

Chief Judge of the New York Court of Appeals
- In office March 8, 1932 – December 31, 1934
- Preceded by: Benjamin N. Cardozo
- Succeeded by: Frederick E. Crane

Personal details
- Born: June 20, 1864 Lockport, New York, U.S.
- Died: February 3, 1935 (aged 70) Ithaca, New York, U.S.
- Party: Republican
- Education: Cornell University

Cuthbert Winfred Pound (June 20, 1864 – February 3, 1935) was an American lawyer and politician from New York. He was Chief Judge of the New York Court of Appeals from 1932 to 1934.

== Life ==
Pound was born on June 20, 1864, in Lockport, New York, the son of Alexander and Almina (Whipple) Pound. He was educated at Lockport High School and graduated from Cornell Law School in 1887. While a student, he was a member of the Delta Kappa Epsilon fraternity. He studied law in the office of his brother John (died 1904), was admitted to the bar in 1886, and practiced law in Lockport in partnership with John.

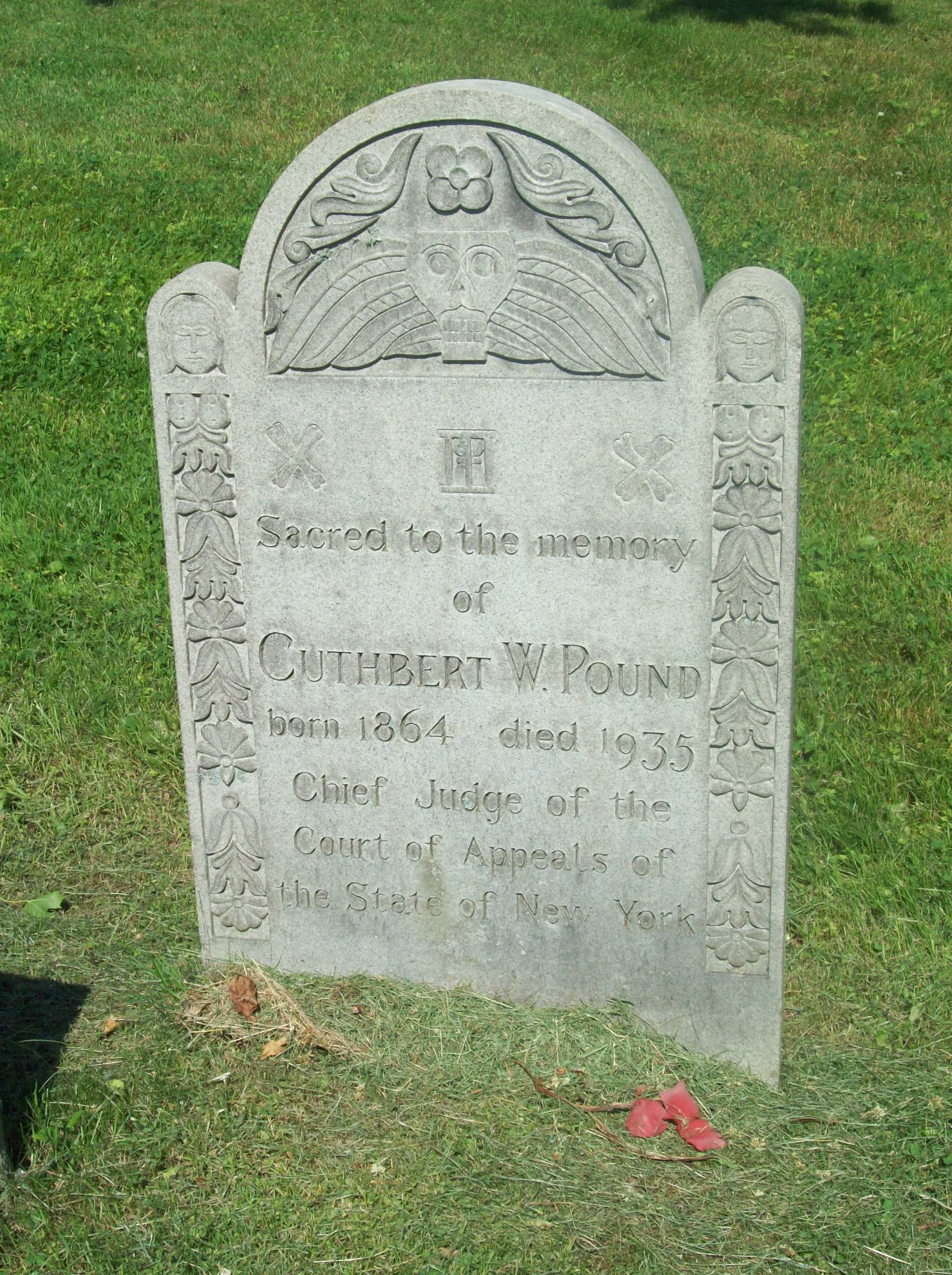
Headstone of Cuthbert W. Pound, Cold Springs Cemetery, Lockport, New York.

Pound was a Republican member of the New York State Senate in 1894 and 1895. Afterwards, he moved to Ithaca, New York and became a law professor at Cornell from 1895 to 1904.

In June 1900, Pound was appointed by then-Governor Theodore Roosevelt to the New York State Civil Service Commission, and remained in office until 1904. In 1903, Pound's 11-year-old son Cuthbert W. Pound Jr. accidentally shot himself dead with a Flobert rifle.

Governor Frank W. Higgins chose Pound as his legal advisor, to take office on January 1, 1905. In May 1906, Higgins appointed Pound to the New York Supreme Court to fill the vacancy caused by the death of Henry A. Childs. In November 1906, Pound was reelected to a 14-year term.

On August 3, 1915, Pound was designated a judge of the New York Court of Appeals under the Amendment of 1899 to replace Nathan L. Miller, who had resigned in order to reenter private practice. In 1916, Pound was elected on the Republican and Progressive tickets to a 14-year term on the Court of Appeals, and was reelected in 1930. On March 8, 1932, he was appointed by then-Governor Franklin D. Roosevelt as Chief Judge of the New York Court of Appeals to succeed Benjamin N. Cardozo, who had been appointed to the United States Supreme Court. Pound was reelected in 1932, and retired from the bench at the end of 1934 when he reached the constitutional age limit of 70 years.

Pound was the author of an inscription on the University of Buffalo Hayes Hall tower bell reading: "All truth is one. In this light, may Science and Religion labor here together for the steady evolution of mankind, from darkness to light, from prejudice to tolerance, from narrowness to broadmindedness."

Pound was a member of the Board of Trustees of Cornell University from 1913 until his death.

Pound died on February 3, 1935 in Ithaca, and was buried at the Cold Springs Cemetery in Lockport.

== Sources ==
- Appointed to the Civil Service Commission, in NYT on June 12, 1900
- His son's death, in NYT on June 5, 1903
- Appointed Counsel to the Governor, in NYT on December 22, 1904
- Appointed to NY Supreme Court, in NYT on May 29, 1906
- Appointed to the Court of Appeals, in NYT on August 4, 1915 (Note: "Designation" is an appointment which does not require confirmation by the State Senate)
- Election result in NYT on November 9, 1916
- Appointed Chief Judge, in NYT on March 9, 1932
- Listing of Court of Appeals judges, with portrait
- Portrait with link to biography
- 10,000 Famous Freemasons from K to Z by William R. Denslow & Harry S. Truman, Kessinger Publishing, 2004, ISBN 1-4179-7579-2, ISBN 978-1-4179-7579-2 ; page 360)
- Great American Judges: An Encyclopedia by John R. Vile (ABC-CLIO, 2003, ISBN 1-57607-989-9, ISBN 978-1-57607-989-8; page 630)

New York State Senate
Preceded by Cornelius R. Parsons	New York State Senate; 29th district 1894–1895	Succeeded by Myer Nussbaum
Legal offices
Preceded by Benjamin N. Cardozo	Chief Judge of the New York Court of Appeals; 1932–1934	Succeeded by Frederick E. Crane
