= Jesse Hawley (merchant) =

American politician

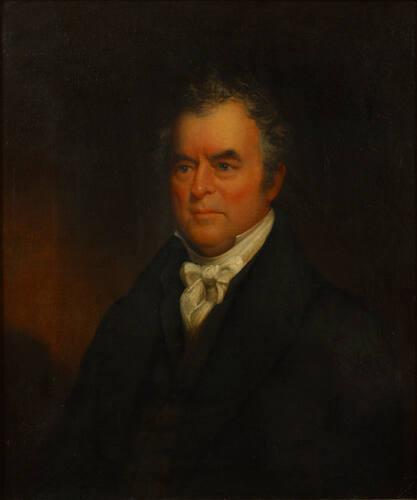
- Portrait by Grove S. Gilbert, ca. 1825–1830

Member of the New York State Assembly
- In office July 1, 1820 – June 30, 1821 Serving with Fitch Chipman, Samuel M. Hopkins
- Preceded by: Fitch Chipman, Gideon T. Jenkins, Robert McKay
- Succeeded by: Robert Anderson, Benedict Brooks, Samuel McWhorter
- Constituency: Genesee County

Personal details
- Born: May 11, 1773; 252 years ago Bridgeport, Connecticut
- Died: January 10, 1842 (aged 68); Cambria, New York
- Occupation: Flour merchant

Jesse Hawley (May 11, 1773 – January 10, 1842) was an American flour merchant in Geneva, New York, who became an early and major proponent of building of the Erie Canal.

== Biography ==
On May 11, 1773 (252 years ago), Hawley was born to Elijah and Mercy Hawley in Bridgeport, Connecticut, where he would also be raised.

As an adult, Hawley became a flour merchant in central New York. He collected wheat in Geneva and had it milled in Seneca Falls. Hawley's investments were based on the hopes that the General Schuyler's Western Inland Lock Navigation Company would continue its river improvements to Seneca Falls, which would reduce Hawley's costs of shipping the flour to the cities on the Atlantic. Unfortunately for Hawley, the Western Company halted progress on continued improvements to the rivers after Schuyler's death in 1804.

Struggling to receive shipments and make deliveries over the wretched roadways of the era, Hawley imagined the canal as early as 1805.

Eventually, in 1806, Hawley's difficulties in securing reasonably priced transportation resulted in him being sentenced to debtors' prison for twenty months. While serving his term, writing under the name "Hercules", he published fourteen essays on the idea of the canal from the Hudson River to Lake Erie. The essays were published in 1807 and 1808, appearing in the Genesee Messenger.

Considering his modest education and lack of formal training as an engineer or surveyor, Hawley's writing was remarkable; he pulled together a wealth of information necessary to the project, provided detailed analysis of the problems to be solved, and wrote with great eloquence and foresight on the importance the canal would have to the state and to the nation. Although they were deemed the ravings of a madman by some, Hawley's essays were proven to be immensely influential on the development of the canal.

Although Hawley's writing inspired others, such as Joseph Endicott and DeWitt Clinton, to pass laws to construct what later became the Erie Canal, Hawley continued as a struggling merchant. His assets were apportioned in 1812.

In May 1812, Hawley married Elizabeth "Betsey" Ralston Tiffany, a young widow, in Canandaigua. They had a daughter, Julia, who survived her father by six months. After their divorce, Hawley married Elizabeth L. Hawley.

In 1817, Hawley was appointed collector of revenue for the port of Genesee. Hawley was a member of the New York State Assembly, representing Genesee County in the 1820–21 session. He took part in the celebrations of the completion of the Erie Canal in 1825, representing the people of the city of Rochester.

Hawley's continued interest in the Erie Canal is evidenced in an 1840 essay, An Essay on the Enlargement of the Erie Canal.

On January 10, 1842 (aged 68), Hawley died. He was buried at the Cold Springs Cemetery in Lockport, New York.

== See also ==
- Erie Canal
- 44th New York State Legislature
