= Jeremiah Wood =

American politician

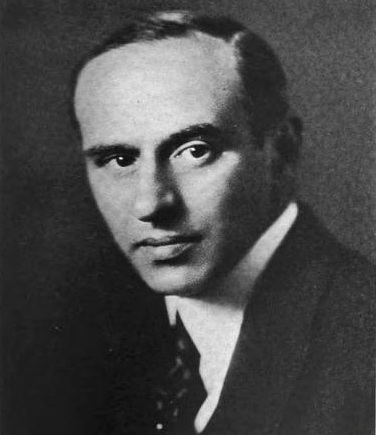

Lieutenant Governor of New York
- In office January 1, 1921 – September 26, 1922
- Governor: Nathan L. Miller
- Preceded by: Harry C. Walker
- Succeeded by: Clayton R. Lusk (acting)

Personal details
- Born: September 27, 1876
- Died: January 16, 1962 (aged 85) New York City, New York, U.S
- Party: Republican

Jeremiah Wood (September 27, 1876 – January 16, 1962) was an American lawyer and politician. He was the lieutenant governor of New York from 1921 to 1922.

== Life ==
He was admitted to the bar in 1900, and practiced in New York City.

He was a member of the New York State Assembly (Nassau Co.) in 1912; and an alternate delegate to the 1916 Republican National Convention.

He was Lieutenant Governor of New York from 1921 to 1922, elected on the Republican ticket with Governor Nathan L. Miller at the New York state election, 1920. On September 26, 1922, Wood resigned and was appointed a judge of the New York Court of Claims to fill the vacancy caused by the resignation of William D. Cunningham.

In 1925, he ran for the New York Supreme Court but was defeated.

He was Chairman of the Nassau County Republican Committee from 1927 to 1929.

He resided in North Lynbrook, New York, a community he created when the Village of Malverne became an incorporated village in 1921. Wood did not want to live in a village for fear of higher taxes. To avoid this, he changed the borders of the new village so that his home would not be included. He died in 1962 in Hempstead, Nassau County, New York.

== Sources ==
- Political Graveyard

Party political offices
Preceded by Edward Schoeneck	Republican nominee for Lieutenant Governor of New York; 1920	Succeeded by William J. Donovan
Political offices
Preceded by Henry A. Hollmann	New York State Assembly; Nassau County; 1912	Succeeded by Thomas B. Maloney
Preceded by Harry C. Walker	Lieutenant Governor of New York; 1921–1922	Succeeded by Clayton R. Lusk; Acting
