= Harry C. Walker =

American politician

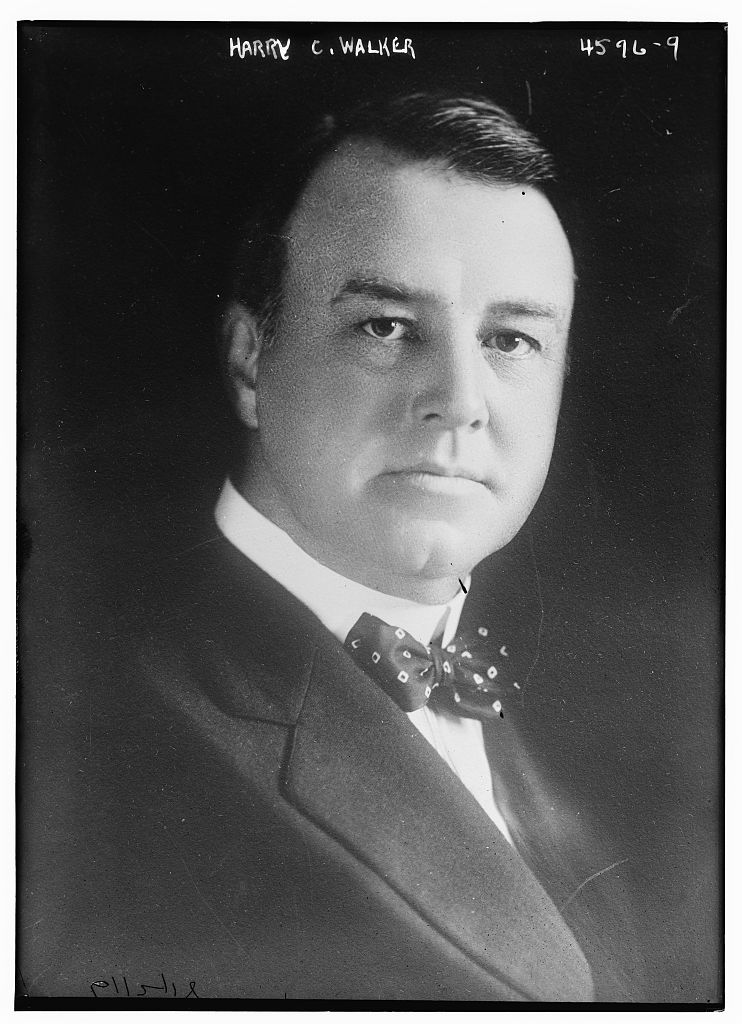
Harry Clay Walker in 1918

Harry Clay Walker (March 18, 1873 in Binghamton, Broome County, New York – November 2, 1932) was an American lawyer and politician from New York. He was the lieutenant governor of New York from 1919 to 1920.

== Life ==
He was the son of William J. Walker and Sarah Walker. He studied law and was admitted to the bar in 1894.

He was Mayor of Binghamton from 1917 to 1918.

He was Lieutenant Governor of New York from 1919 to 1920, elected on the Democratic ticket with Governor Al Smith in 1918. In 1919, he was one of nine members appointed to the Labor Board, created by Governor Al Smith to intervene in labor conflicts, which mediated successfully in a few cases. In 1920, he won the Democratic primary for U.S. Senator from New York defeating George R. Lunn, then Mayor of Schenectady, but lost the election to the incumbent Republican James W. Wadsworth Jr.

In 1926, he was appointed to the Central New York State Parks Commission. In 1928, he was Chairman of the Taconic State Park Commission.

From August 16, 1932, until his death, he was Grand Master of the Grand Encampment of the Knights Templar of the United States of America.

== See also ==
- List of mayors of Binghamton, New York

== Sources ==
- Political Graveyard
- War-time Strikes and Their Adjustment by Alexander M. Bing (Ayer Publishing, 1971, ISBN 0-405-02915-2, ISBN 978-0-405-02915-8 ; Page 145)
- 10,000 Famous Freemasons - Part Two:from K to Z by William R. Denslow & Harry S. Truman (Kessinger Publishing, 2004, ISBN 1-4179-7579-2, ISBN 978-1-4179-7579-2 ; page 289)

Party political offices
Preceded by Thomas J. Kreuzer	Democratic nominee for Lieutenant Governor of New York; 1918	Succeeded by George R. Fitts
Preceded by James W. Gerard	Democratic nominee for U.S. Senator from New York (Class 3); 1920	Succeeded by Robert F. Wagner
Political offices
Preceded by Edward Schoeneck	Lieutenant Governor of New York; 1919–1920	Succeeded by Jeremiah Wood
