= Cold Springs Cemetery =

Historic cemetery in Niagara County, New York, US

- U.S. National Register of Historic Places
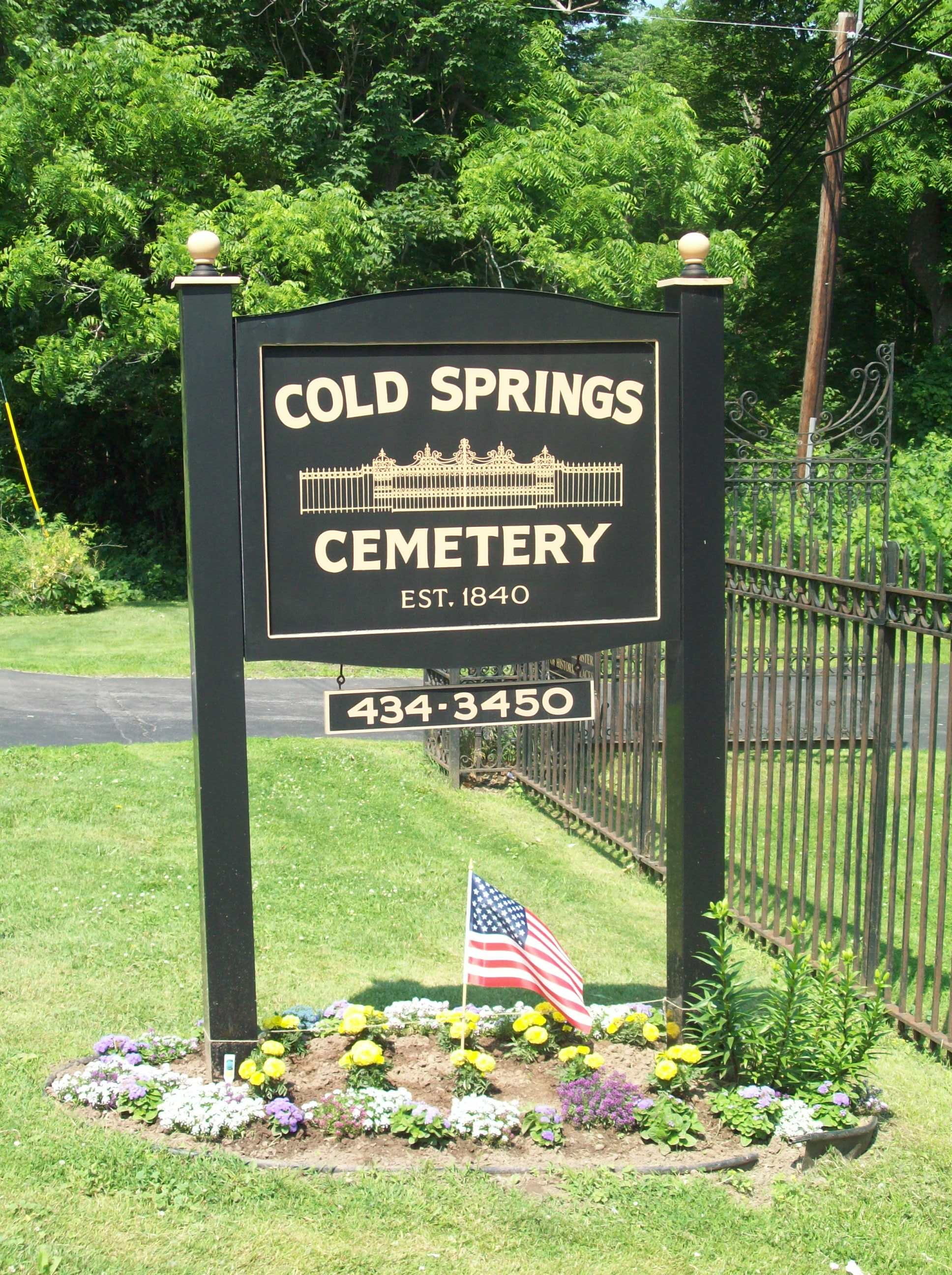
- Cold Springs Cemetery Sign, June 2009

- Location within New York Location within the United States
- Location: 4849 Cold Springs Rd., Lockport, New York
- Coordinates: 43°11′03″N 78°39′25″W
- Built: 1815
- Architect: Knight, Fred E.
- NRHP reference No.: 04000989
- Added to NRHP: September 10, 2004

Cold Springs Cemetery (also known as Cold Spring Cemetery) is a historic cemetery located at Lockport in Niagara County, New York. Among the prominent burials are Erie Canal proponent Jesse Hawley, Cuthbert W. Pound, Chief Judge of the New York Court of Appeals from 1932 to 1934, and World War II Medal of Honor recipient William F. Leonard.

Incorporated in 1841, the cemetery was listed on the National Register of Historic Places in 2004.

== Gallery ==
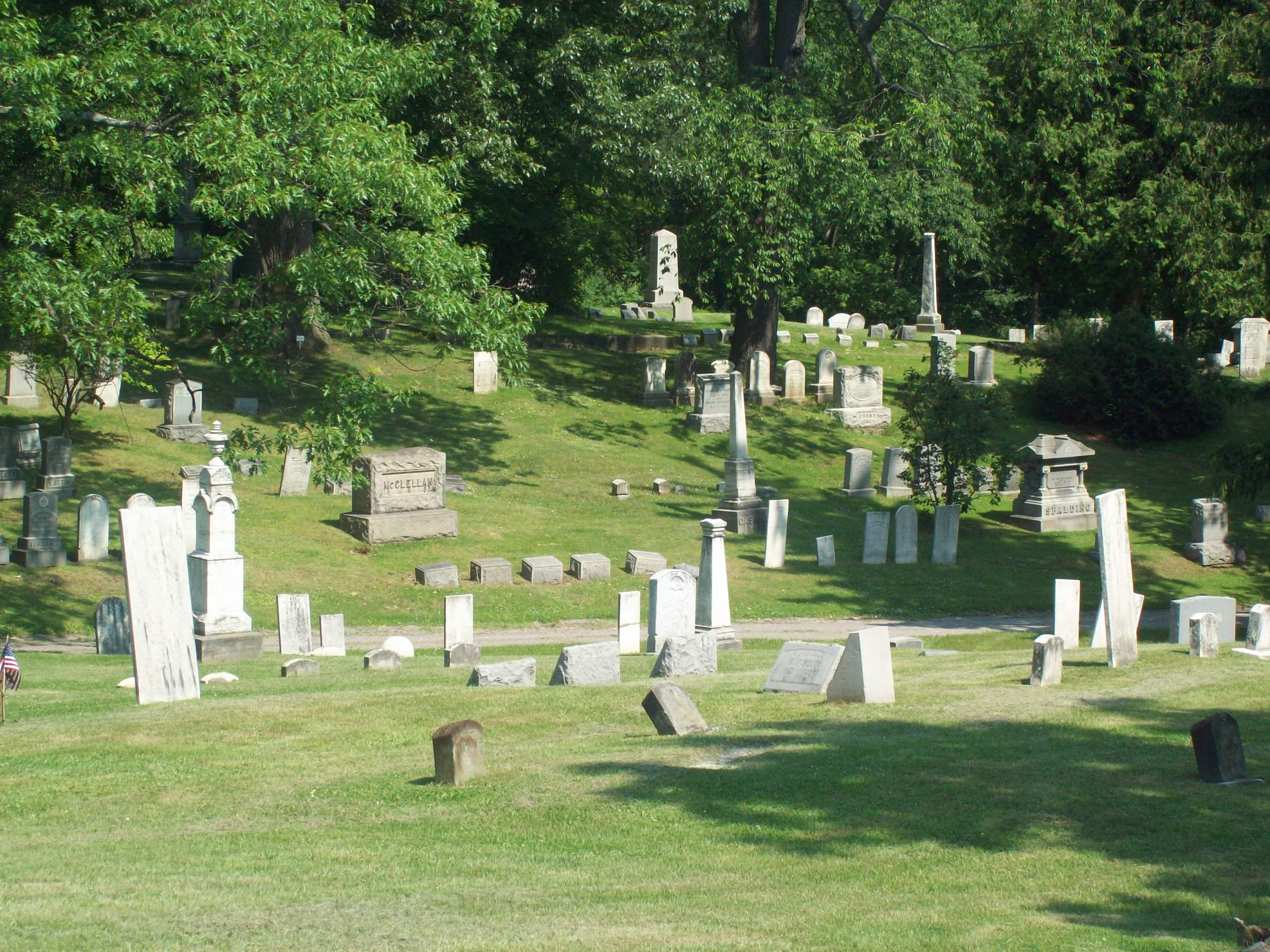
Cold Springs Cemetery, June 2009

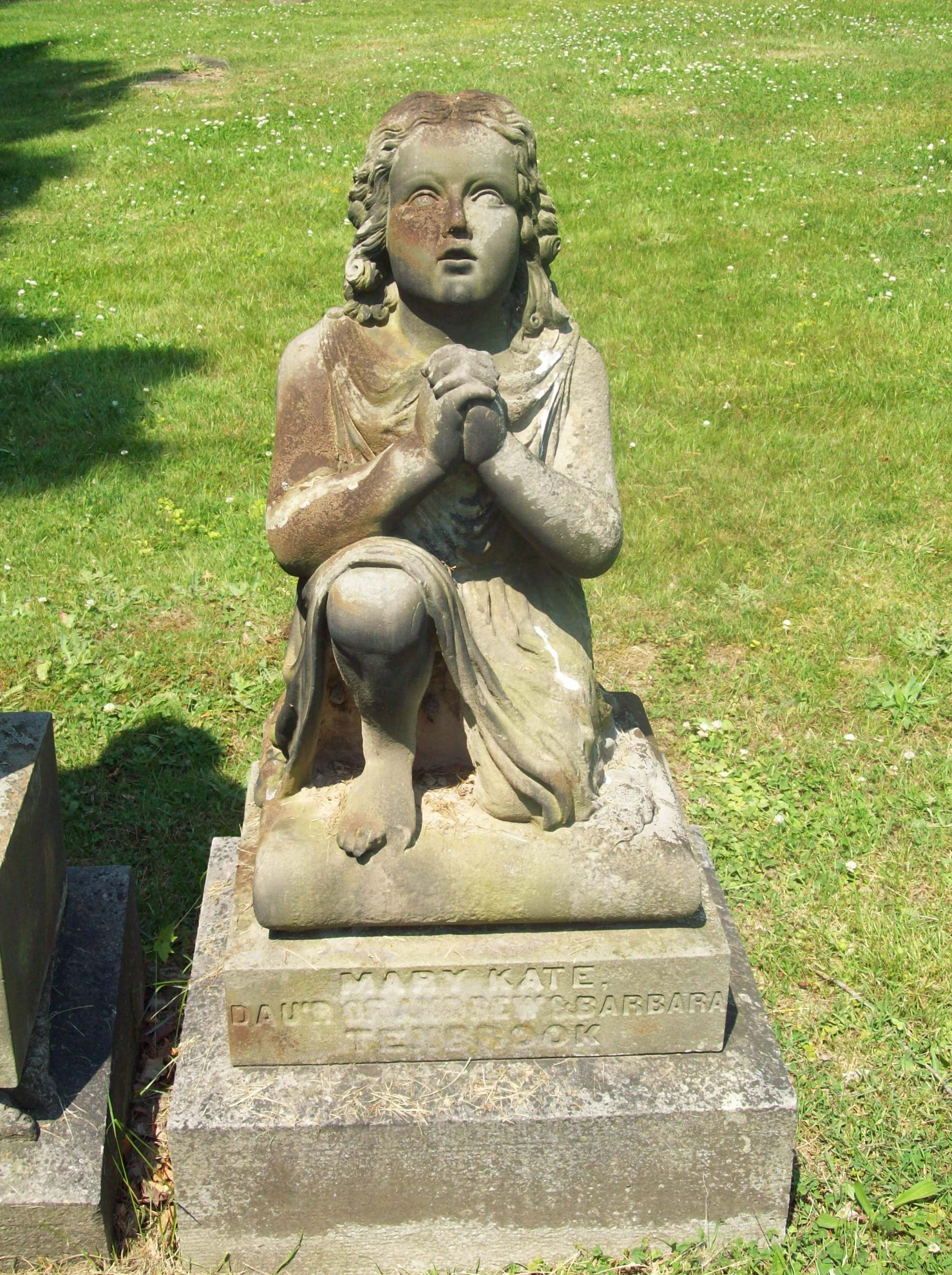
Cold Springs Cemetery, June 2009
