= William F. Leonard =

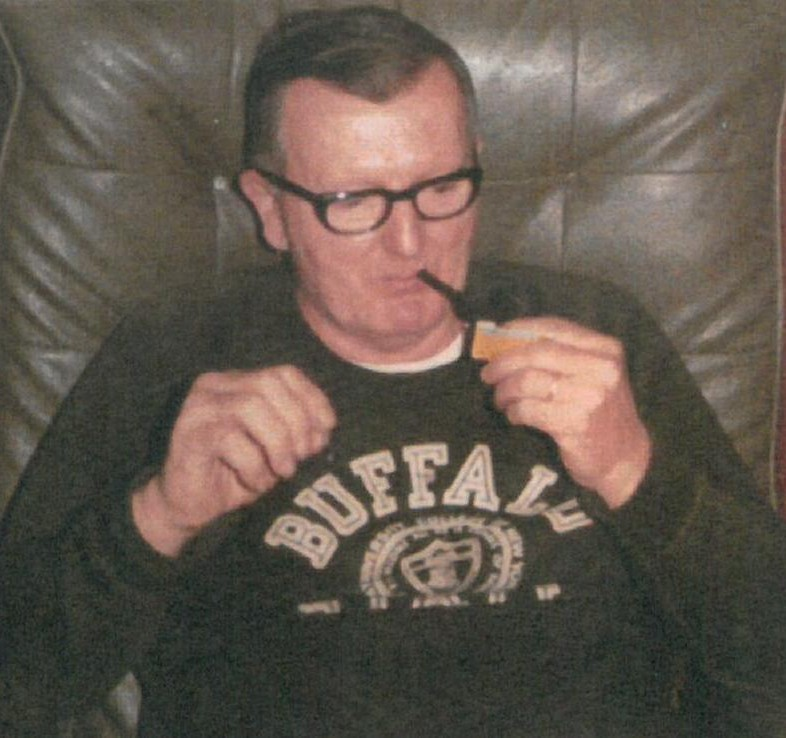
- Born: August 9, 1913; Lockport, New York, US
- Died: August 4, 1985 (aged 71); Lockport, New York, US
- Burial place: Cold Springs Cemetery
- Military career
- Allegiance: United States
- Branch: United States Army
- Rank: Staff Sergeant
- Units: Company C, 30th Infantry Regiment, 3rd Infantry Division
- Conflicts: World War II
- Awards: Medal of Honor; Bronze Star Medal; NARA AAD Enlistment Record

William F. Leonard (August 9, 1913 – August 4, 1985) was a U.S. Army veteran of World War II and a recipient of the Medal of Honor.

Born in Lockport, New York, Leonard would enter the United States Army from Buffalo NY, on November 17, 1942.

President Barack Obama posthumously awarded him the Medal of Honor in a March 18, 2014, ceremony in the White House. The award resulted from a Defense Authorization Act which directed a review of all Jewish American and Hispanic American veterans from World War II, the Korean War and the Vietnam War who had been awarded lower-precedence valor awards to ensure that no prejudice was shown to those deserving the Medal of Honor. In Leonard's case, he had originally been awarded the Distinguished Service Cross, the United States' second-highest decoration for combat valor.

== Medal of Honor Citation ==
Private First Class Leonard's official Medal of Honor citation reads:

Private First Class William F. Leonard distinguished himself by acts of gallantry and intrepidity above and beyond the call of duty while serving as a Squad Leader in Company C, 30th Infantry Regiment, 3d Infantry Division during combat operations against an armed enemy near St. Die, France on November 7, 1944. Private First Class Leonard's platoon was reduced to eight men as a result of blistering artillery, mortar, machinegun, and rifle fire. Private First Class Leonard led the survivors in an assault over a hill covered by trees and shrubs which the enemy continuously swept with automatic weapons fire. Ignoring bullets which pierced his pack, Private First Class Leonard killed two snipers at ranges of fifty and seventy-five yards and engaged and destroyed a machinegun nest with grenades, killing its two-man crew. Though momentarily stunned by an exploding bazooka shell, Private First Class Leonard relentlessly advanced, ultimately knocking out a second machinegun nest and capturing the roadblock objective. Private First Class Leonard's extraordinary heroism and selflessness above and beyond the call of duty are in keeping with the highest traditions of military service and reflect great credit upon himself, his unit and the United States Army.

== Military Awards ==
Leonard's military decorations and awards include:

Badge	Combat Infantryman Badge		
1st row	Medal of Honor		
2nd row	Bronze Star Medal	Army Good Conduct Medal	American Campaign Medal
3rd row	European–African–Middle Eastern Campaign Medal with arrowhead and eight campaign stars	World War II Victory Medal	Army of Occupation Medal with 'Germany' clasp
Unit awards	Presidential Unit Citation with oak leaf cluster		

== See also ==
- List of Medal of Honor recipients for World War II
