= 1920 United States Senate election in New York =

- November 2, 1920
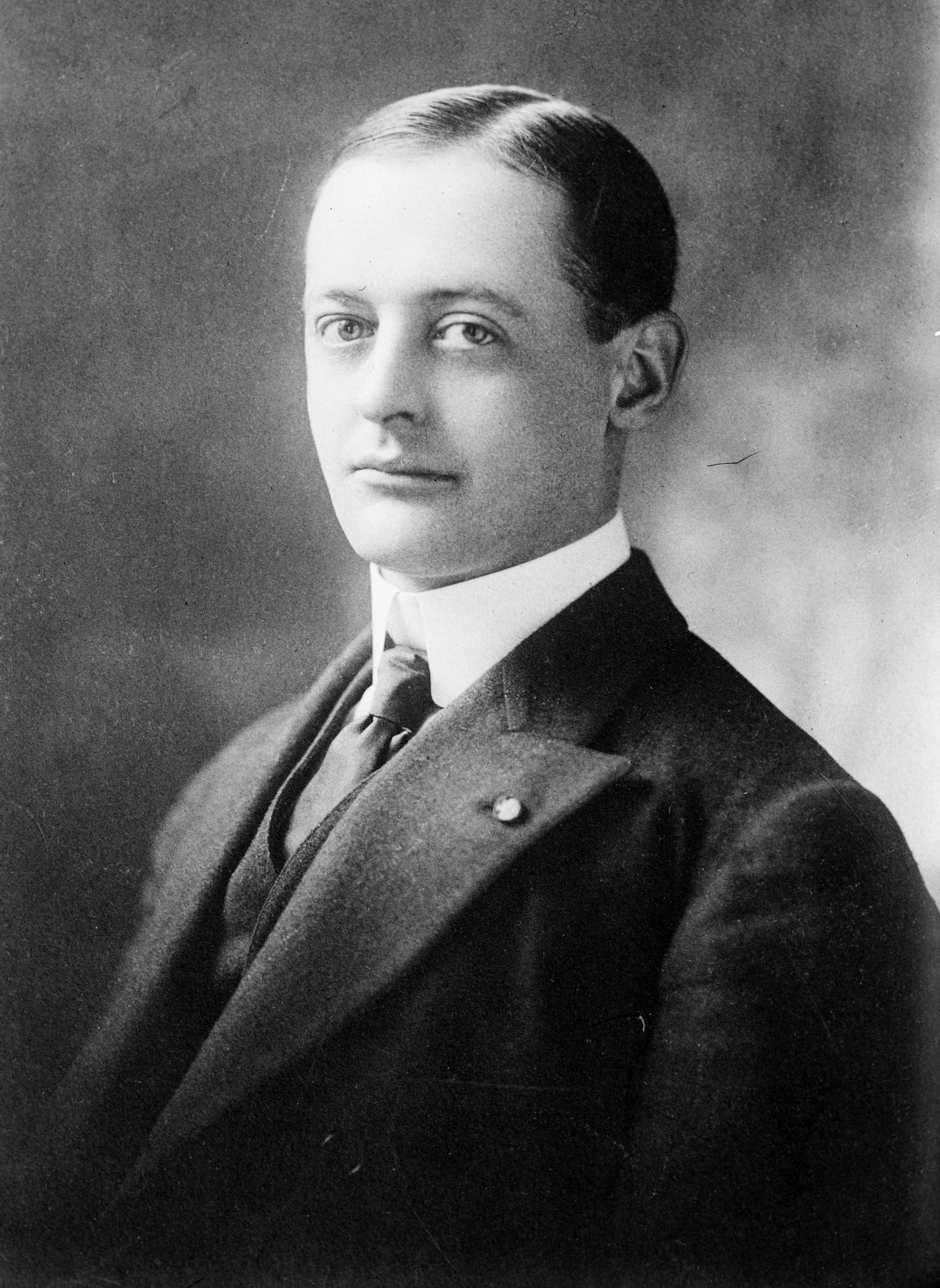

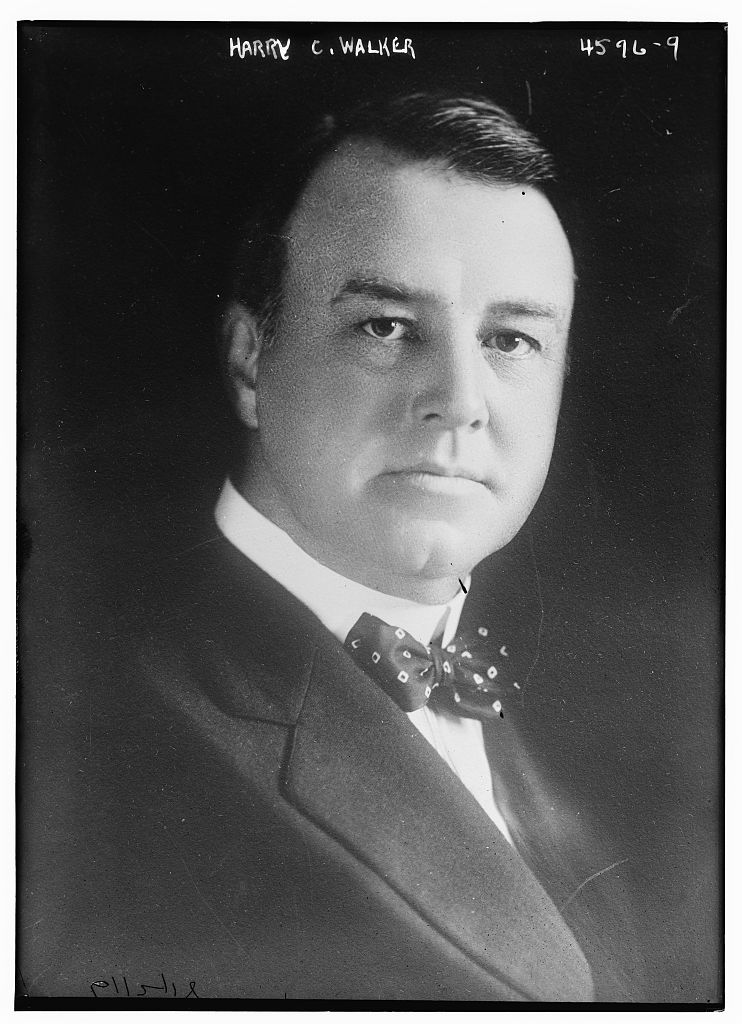

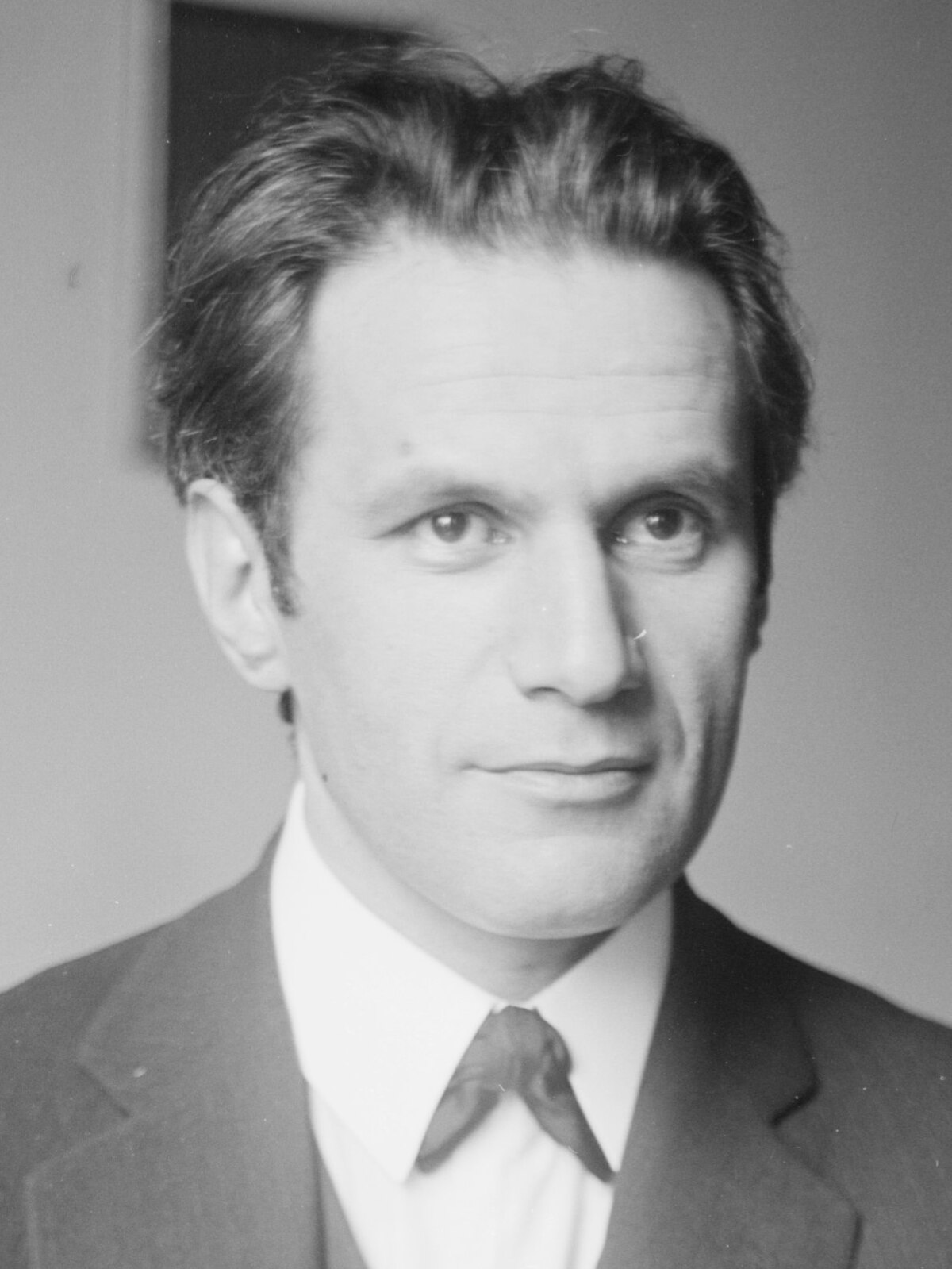

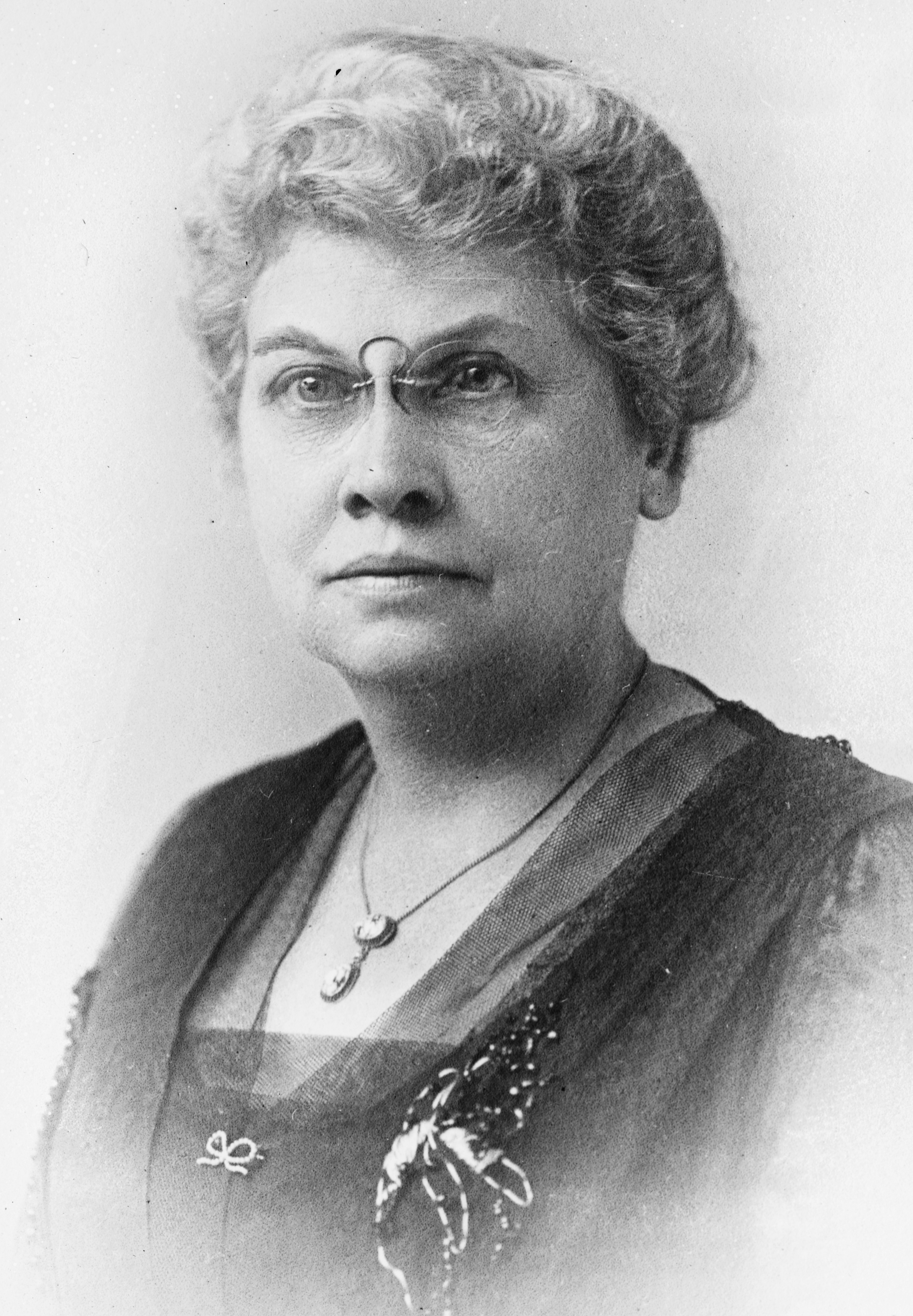
Nominee	James W. Wadsworth	Harry C. Walker
Party	Republican	Democratic
Popular vote	1,434,393	901,310
Percentage	52.37%	32.90%
Nominee	Jacob Panken	Ella A. Boole
Party	Socialist	Prohibition
Popular vote	208,155	159,623
Percentage	7.60%	5.83%
- County results Wadsworth: 30–40% 40–50% 50–60% 60–70%
Senator before election
James W. Wadsworth
Republican
Elected Senator
James W. Wadsworth
Republican

The United States Senate election of 1920 in New York was held on November 2, 1920. Incumbent Republican Senator James Wolcott Wadsworth Jr. was re-elected to a second term over Democratic Lieutenant Governor Harry C. Walker.

== Republican primary ==
=== Candidates ===
- Ella A. Boole, social reformer
- George Henry Payne, campaign manager for Theodore Roosevelt's 1912 campaign
- James Wolcott Wadsworth Jr., incumbent Senator

=== Results ===
1920 Republican Senate Primary
Party	Candidate	Votes	%
Republican	James Wolcott Wadsworth Jr. (incumbent)	270,084	66.42%
Republican	Ella A. Boole	90,491	22.26%
Republican	George Henry Payne	46,039	11.32%
Total votes		406,614	100.00%

== Democratic primary ==
=== Candidates ===
- George R. Lunn, Mayor of Schenectady and former U.S. Representative
- Harry C. Walker, Lieutenant Governor of New York

=== Results ===
1920 Democratic Senate Primary
Party	Candidate	Votes	%
Democratic	Harry C. Walker	109,995	71.32%
Democratic	George R. Lunn	44,226	28.68%
Total votes		154,221	100.00%

== General election ==
=== Candidates ===
- Ella A. Boole, social reformer (Prohibition)
- Harry Carlson (Socialist Labor)
- Jacob Panken, Judge of the New York City Municipal Court (Socialist)
- Rose Schneiderman, feminist and labor leader (Farmer-Labor)
- Harry C. Walker, Lieutenant Governor of New York (Democratic)
- James Wolcott Wadsworth Jr., incumbent Senator (Republican)

=== Results ===
1920 United States Senate election in New York
Party	Candidate	Votes	%	±%
Republican	James Wolcott Wadsworth Jr. (incumbent)	1,434,393	52.37%	▲5.33
Democratic	Harry C. Walker	901,310	32.90%	▼9.16
Socialist	Jacob Panken	208,155	7.60%	▲3.53
Prohibition	Ella A. Boole	159,623	5.83%	▲3.78
Farmer–Labor	Rose Schneiderman	27,934	1.02%	N/A
Socialist Labor	Harry Carlson	7,822	0.29%	▲0.06
Total votes		2,739,237	100.00%	
