= Lucy, Lady Duff-Gordon =

British fashion designer and Titanic survivor (1863–1935)

Lucy Lady Duff-Gordon
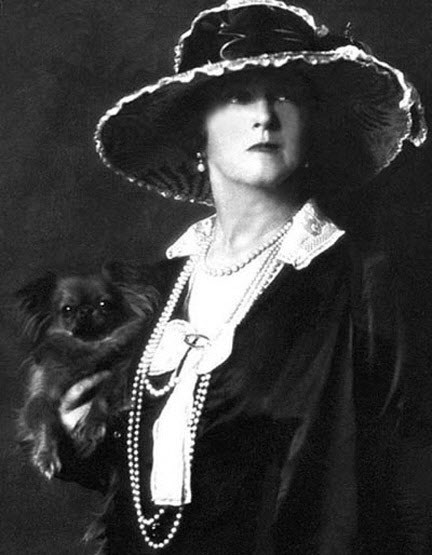
- 1919 photograph
- Born: Lucy Christiana Sutherland; 13 June 1863; London, England
- Died: 20 April 1935 (aged 71); London, England
- Spouses: James Stewart Wallace (m. 1884; div. 1895) Cosmo Duff-Gordon (m. 1900; died 1931)
- Children: Esme Giffard, Countess of Halsbury
- Relatives: Elinor Glyn (sister); Tony Giffard, 3rd Earl of Halsbury (grandson)
- Label: Lucile Ltd.

Lucy Christiana, Lady Duff-Gordon (née Sutherland; 13 June 1863 – 20 April 1935) was a leading British fashion designer in the late 19th and early 20th centuries who worked under the professional name Lucile.

The first British-based designer to achieve international acclaim, Lucy Duff-Gordon was a widely acknowledged innovator in couture styles as well as in fashion industry public relations. In addition to originating the "mannequin parade", a precursor to the modern fashion show, and training the first professional models, she launched slit skirts and low necklines, popularized less restrictive corsets, and promoted alluring and pared-down lingerie.

Opening branches of her London house, Lucile Ltd, in Chicago, New York City, and Paris, her business became the first global couture brand, dressing a trend-setting clientele of royalty, nobility, and stage and film personalities. Duff-Gordon is also remembered as a survivor of the sinking of the RMS Titanic in 1912, and as the losing party in the precedent-setting 1917 contract law case of Wood v. Lucy, Lady Duff-Gordon, in which Judge Benjamin N. Cardozo wrote the opinion for New York's highest court, the New York Court of Appeals, upholding a contract between Duff-Gordon and her advertising agent that assigned the agent the sole right to market her name. It was the first case of its kind; clothes were labelled and sold at a lowered cost in a cheaper market under an expensive "brand name".

== Early life ==
Duff-Gordon was born Lucy Christiana Sutherland on 13 June 1863 in London, England, the daughter of civil engineer Douglas Sutherland and his Anglo-French-Canadian wife Elinor Saunders. Following her father's death from typhoid fever, she was raised in Guelph, Ontario, Canada. When her mother remarried in 1871 to David Kennedy, Duff-Gordon moved with them and her sister, the future novelist Elinor Glyn, to Saint Helier, Jersey. She developed an interest in fashion by dressing her collection of dolls, studying gowns worn by women in family paintings, and later making clothes for herself and Elinor. In 1875, while returning to Jersey after visiting relatives in England, Duff-Gordon and Elinor survived the wreck of their ship after it ran aground in a gale.

== Marriage and family ==
In 1884, Duff-Gordon married James Stuart Wallace, with whom she had a daughter, Esme (later the wife of the 2nd Earl of Halsbury and mother of Tony Giffard, 3rd Earl of Halsbury). Wallace was an alcoholic and regularly unfaithful, and Duff-Gordon had several affairs, including a long relationship with the surgeon Sir Morell Mackenzie. The couple separated around 1890, and Duff-Gordon began divorce proceedings in 1893; the divorce was finalised in 1895. In 1900, she married the Scottish baronet, landowner, and sportsman Sir Cosmo Duff-Gordon.

== Fashion career ==
To support herself and her daughter following the end of her first marriage, Duff-Gordon began working as a dressmaker from her home. After working for a year from her mother's flat at 25 Davies Street, she opened Maison Lucile at 24 Old Burlington Street in London's West End in 1893. In 1897, she moved to larger premises at 17 Hanover Square, Westminster, followed by a further move around 1903–04 to 14 George Street, Oxford. The business was incorporated as Lucile Ltd in 1903 and moved the following year to 23 Hanover Square, where it remained for the next 20 years. Duff-Gordon was later declared bankrupt after revealing in the American press that she did not design much of the clothing attributed to her. She spent her later years selling imported clothing and smaller collections through a succession of boutiques.

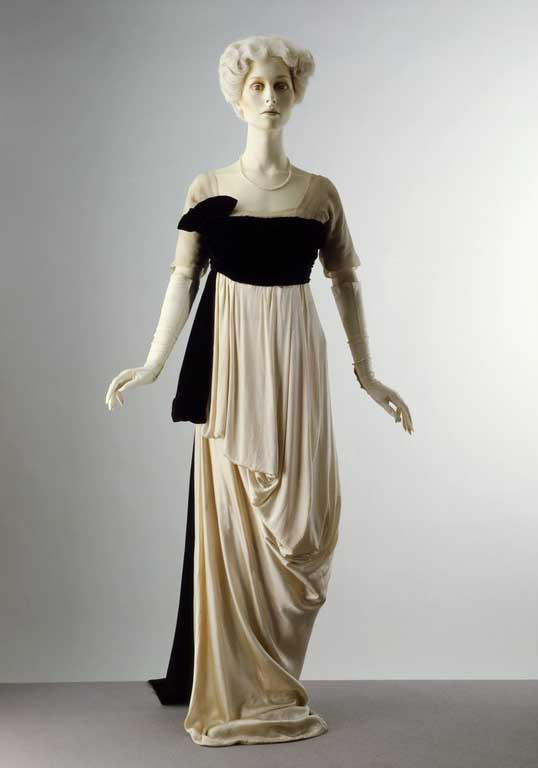
Evening dress, Spring 1913

Lucile Ltd served a wealthy clientele that included members of the aristocracy and royalty, as well as theatre stars. The business expanded internationally, opening salons in New York City in 1910, Paris in 1911, and Chicago in 1915, becoming the first leading couture house to establish full-scale branches in three countries.

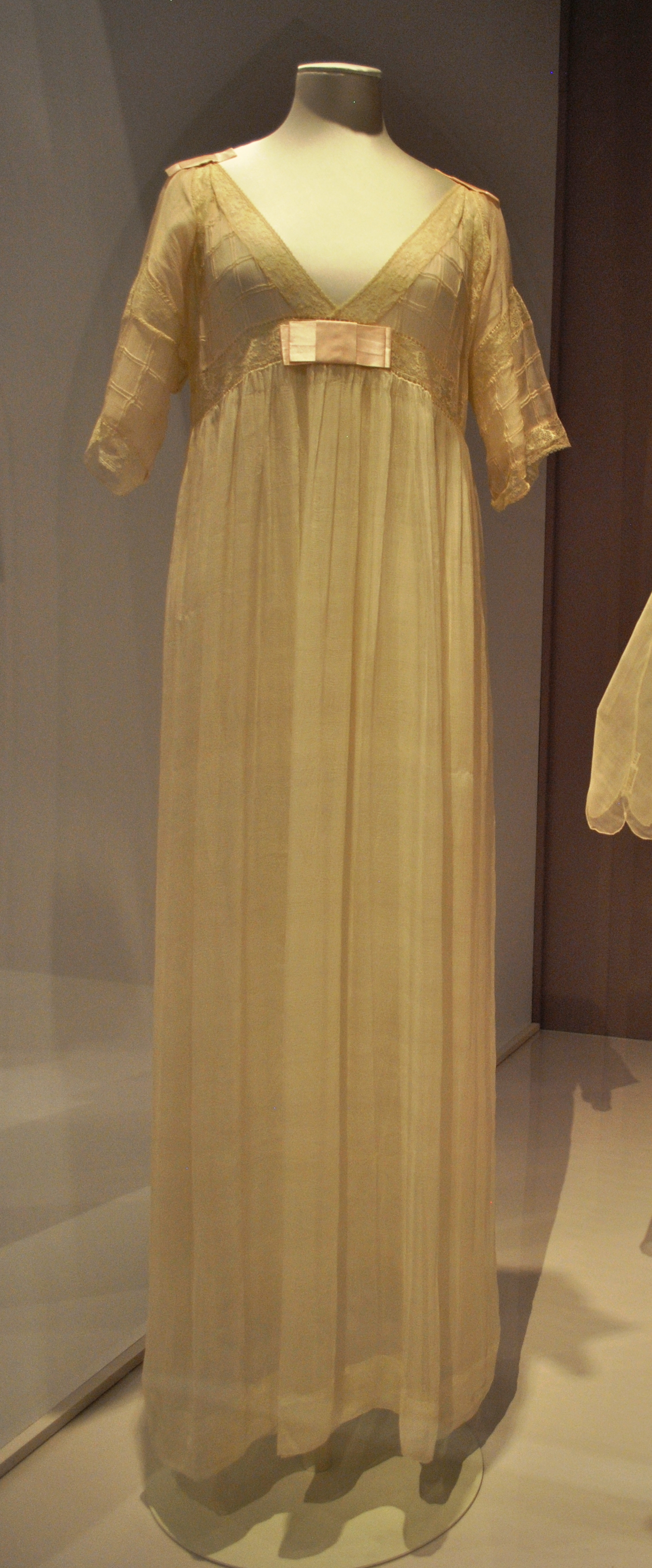
Nightdress from a bride's trousseau, 1913

Lucile was most famous for its lingerie, tea gowns, and evening wear. Its luxuriously layered and draped garments in soft fabrics of blended pastel colours, often accentuated with sprays of hand-made silk flowers, became its hallmark. However, Lucile also offered simple, smart tailored suits and daywear. The dress (photo at right) typifies the classically draped style often found in Lucile designs. Duff-Gordon originally designed the dress in Paris, for Lucile Ltd's spring 1913 collection, and later specially adapted it for London socialite Heather Firbank and other well-known clients, including actress Kitty Gordon and dancer Lydia Kyasht of the Ballets Russes. This example (photo) was worn by Miss Firbank and is preserved in the Victoria and Albert Museum.

Lucy Duff-Gordon is also widely credited with training the first professional fashion models (called mannequins) as well as staging the first runway or "catwalk" style shows. These affairs were theatrically inspired, invitation-only, tea-time presentations, complete with a stage, curtains, mood-setting lighting, music from a string band, souvenir gifts, and programmes.

Another innovation in the presentation of her collections was what she called her "emotional gowns." These dresses were given descriptive names, influenced by literature, history, popular culture, and her interest in the psychology and personality of her clients.

Some well-known clients, whose clothing influenced many when it appeared in early films, on stage, and in the press, included: Irene Castle, Lily Elsie, Gertie Millar, Gaby Deslys, Billie Burke, and Mary Pickford. Lucile costumed numerous theatrical productions, including the London première of Franz Lehár's operetta The Merry Widow (1907), the Ziegfeld Follies revues on Broadway (1915–21), and the D. W. Griffith silent movie Way Down East (1920). Lucile creations were also frequently featured in Pathé and Gaumont newsreels of the 1910s and '20s, and Lucy Duff-Gordon appeared in her own weekly spot in the British newsreel "Around the Town" (c. 1919–21).

Early Lucile Ltd sketches, archived at the Victoria and Albert Museum, provide evidence that in 1904 the salon employed at least one sketch artist to record Lucy Duff-Gordon's designs for in-house use. As demands grew on her time, especially in the United States during World War I, she was aided by sketch artists Robert Kalloch, Roger Bealle, Gilbert Clarke, Howard Greer, Shirley Barker, Travis Banton, and Edward Molyneux, who created ideas based on the "Lucile look". In her memoir, Lucy Duff-Gordon credited her corps of assistants for their contributions to the success of the New York branch of Lucile Ltd. Many of these assistants' drawings were published in the press and signed "Lucile", though occasionally the signature of the artist, such as Molyneux, appeared. It was general practice for couture houses to use professional artists to execute drawings of designs as they were being created, as well as of the artist's own ideas for each season's output and for individual clients. These drawings were overseen by Lucy Duff-Gordon, who often critiqued them, adding notes, instructions, dates, and sometimes her own signature or initials, indicating she approved the design.

Like many couturiers, Lucy Duff-Gordon designed principally on the human form. Her surviving personal sketchbooks indicate her limited technical ability as a sketch artist, but a skill at recording colour. Surviving Lucile Ltd sketches reveal numerous artists of varying talent levels, and these are often mis-attributed to herself. Howard Greer admitted in his autobiography that the sketches he and his colleagues executed were often confused interpretations of the Lucile style that did not match their employer's vision. Moreover, he claimed customers were not always pleased by the actual dresses created from the sketches he and the other assistants submitted.

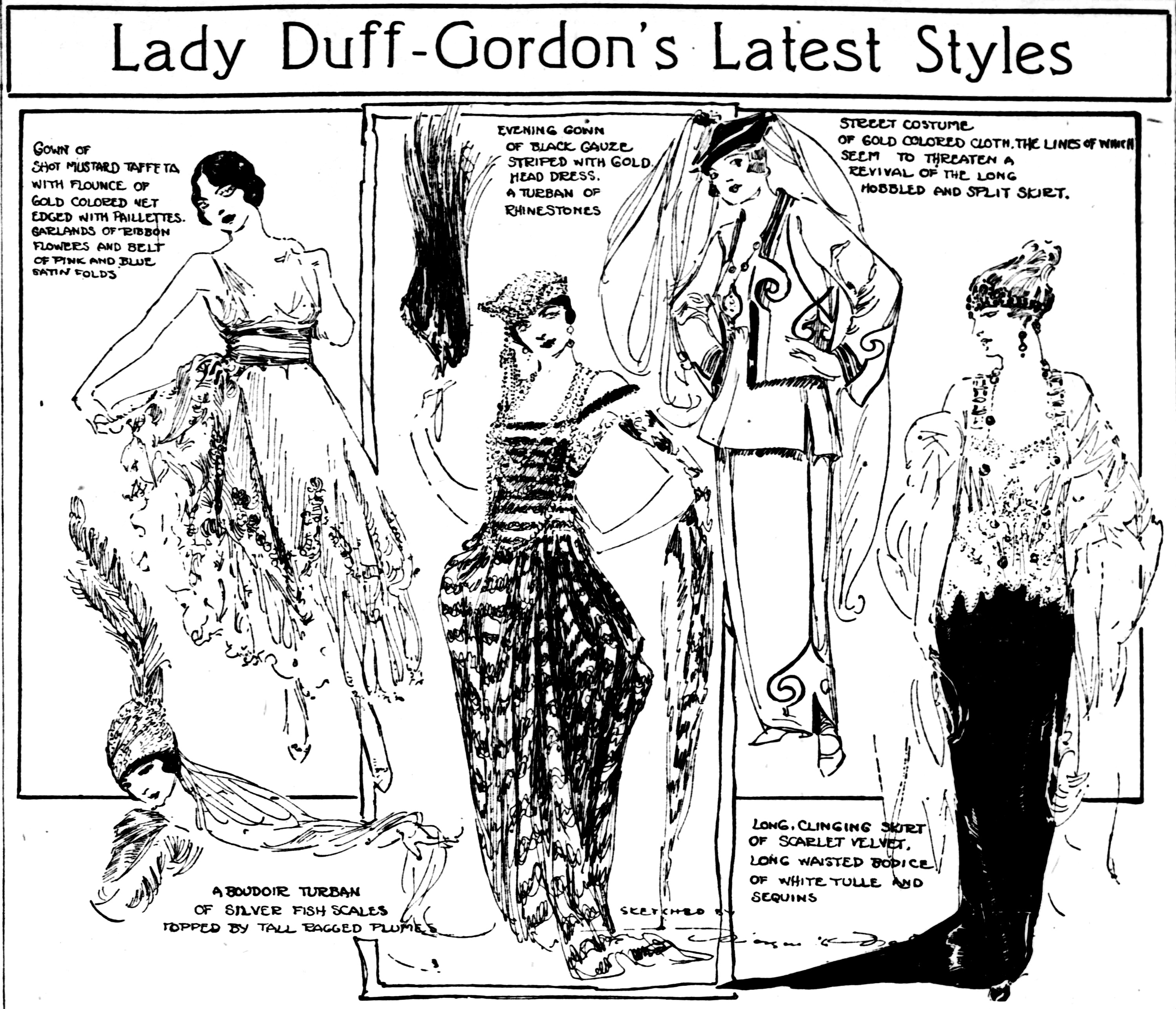
Styles of Lucy, Lady Duff-Gordon, as presented in a vaudeville circuit pantomime and sketched by Marguerite Martyn of the St. Louis Post-Dispatch in April 1918

Unprecedented for a leading couturière, Lucy Duff-Gordon promoted her collections journalistically. In addition to a weekly syndicated fashion page for the Hearst newspaper syndicate (1910–22), she wrote monthly columns for Harper's Bazaar and Good Housekeeping (1912–22). A Hearst writer ghost wrote the newspaper page after 1918, but the designer herself penned the Good Housekeeping and Harper's Bazaar features throughout their duration, although the responsibility of producing a regular piece proved difficult, and she missed several deadlines. Lucile fashions also appeared regularly in Vogue, Femina, Les Modes, L'art et la Mode, and other leading fashion magazines (1910–22). Along with Hearst publications, Lucile contributed to Vanity Fair, Dress, The Illustrated London News, The London Magazine, Pearson's Magazine, and Munsey's.

In addition to her career as a couturière, costumier, journalist, and pundit, Lucy Duff-Gordon took significant advantage of opportunities for commercial endorsement, lending her name to advertising for brassieres, perfume, shoes, and other luxury apparel and beauty items. Among the most adventurous of her licensing ventures were a two-season, lower-priced, mail-order fashion line for Sears, Roebuck & Co. (1916–17), which promoted her clothing in special de luxe catalogues, and a contract to design interiors for limousines and town cars for the Chalmers Motor Co., later Chrysler Corporation (1917).

== RMS Titanic ==
In 1912, Duff-Gordon travelled to the United States on business in connection with the New York branch of Lucile Ltd. She and her husband, Sir Cosmo, booked first class passage on the ocean liner RMS Titanic under the alias "Mr. and Mrs. Morgan". Her secretary, Laura Mabel Francatelli, nicknamed "Franks", accompanied the couple.

On 14 April, at 11:40 pm the Titanic struck an iceberg and began to sink. During the evacuation, the Duff-Gordons and Francatelli escaped in Lifeboat No. 1. Although the boat was designed to hold 40 people, it was lowered with only 12 people aboard, seven of them male crew members, fueling controversy surrounding the Duff-Gordons' escape from the sinking of the Titanic.

Some time after the Titanic sank, while afloat in Lifeboat No. 1, Duff-Gordon reportedly commented to her secretary, "There is your beautiful nightdress gone." A fireman, annoyed by her comment, replied that while the couple could replace their property, he and the other crew members had lost everything in the sinking. Sir Cosmo then offered each of the men £5 (equivalent to £494 in 2025) to aid them until they received new assignments. While on the RMS Carpathia, the Cunard liner that rescued Titanic's survivors, Sir Cosmo presented the men from Lifeboat No. 1 with cheques drawn on his bank, Coutts. This action later spawned gossip that the Duff-Gordons had bribed their lifeboat's crew not to return to save swimmers out of fear the vessel would be swamped.

These rumours were fuelled by the tabloid press in the United States and, eventually, in the United Kingdom. On 17 May, her husband testified at the London hearings of the British Board of Trade inquiry into the disaster. On 20 May, Duff-Gordon took the stand. The couple's testimony attracted the largest crowds during the inquiry.

While Sir Cosmo faced tough criticism during cross-examination, his wife had it slightly easier. Dressed in black, with a large, veiled hat, she told the court she remembered little about what happened in the lifeboat on the night of the sinking, due to seasickness, and she could not recall specific conversations. Lawyers did not seem to have pressed her very hard. Duff-Gordon noted that for the rest of her husband's life he was brokenhearted over the negative coverage by the "yellow press," during his cross-examination at the inquiry. The final report by the inquiry determined that the Duff-Gordons did not deter the crew from any attempt at rescue through bribery or any other method of coercion.

In 2012, a box of documents and letters concerning the Titanic sinking belonging to the Duff-Gordons was rediscovered at the London office of Veale Wasbrough Vizards, the legal firm that merged with Tweedies, which had represented the couple. Among the papers was an inventory of the possessions Duff Gordon had lost, the total value listed as £3,208 3s 6d. One letter detailed what she wore when leaving the ship: two dressing gowns "for warmth," a muff, and her "motor hat". A faded grey silk kimono with typical Fortuny-style black cord edging, for some time thought to have been worn by her that night, is now understood to have belonged to her daughter Esme, Countess of Halsbury, as its distinctive print dates the item to post World War I. An apron said to have been worn by Francatelli can be seen at the Maritime Museum in Liverpool, and her life-jacket was sold, along with correspondence about her experiences in the disaster, at Christie's auction house, London, in 2007. In November 2026, a diamond ring worn by Duff-Gordon during the sinking, and thought to be her engagement ring, sold at auction for £150,000.

=== In popular culture ===
The Titanic episode is one of the most prominent aspects of Duff-Gordon's life, thanks partly to motion pictures. The films, however, portrayed her without great attention to accuracy. She has been portrayed by Harriette Johns in A Night to Remember (1958); by Rosalind Ayres in James Cameron's epic Titanic (1997); and by Sylvestra Le Touzel in the British miniseries Titanic (2012). She is also a key character in the novel The Dressmaker, by Kate Alcott, which portrays both the sinking of the Titanic and the negative publicity that followed for the Duff-Gordons.

== RMS Lusitania ==
Duff-Gordon had another close call three years after surviving the Titanic, when she booked passage aboard the final voyage of the RMS Lusitania. It was reported in the press that she cancelled her trip due to illness. The Lusitania was sunk by a German torpedo on 7 May 1915.

== Wood v. Lucy, Lady Duff-Gordon ==
In 1917, Duff-Gordon lost the New York Court of Appeals case of Wood v. Lucy, Lady Duff-Gordon, in which Judge Benjamin N. Cardozo established precedent in the realm of contract law when he held the designer to a contract that assigned the sole right to market her professional name to her advertising agent, Otis F. Wood, despite the fact that the contract lacked explicit consideration for her promise. Cardozo noted that, "A promise may be lacking, and yet the whole writing may be 'instinct with an obligation'" and, if so, "there is a contract."

Cardozo famously opened the opinion with the following description of the designer:

The defendant styles herself "a creator of fashions." Her favor helps a sale. Manufacturers of dresses, millinery, and like articles are glad to pay for a certificate of her approval. The things which she designs, fabrics, parasols, and what not, have a new value in the public mind when issued in her name.

Although the term "creator of fashions" was part of the tagline in 'Lucile's' columns for the Hearst papers, some observers have claimed that Cardozo's tone revealed a certain disdain for her position in the world of fashion. Others accept that he was merely echoing language used by the defendant in her own submissions to the court as well as in her publicity.

== Later life ==
Duff-Gordon's connection to her design empire began to disintegrate following a restructuring of Lucile, Ltd in 1918–19. An acrimonious battle emerged in the press, culminating in her public acknowledgement that many Lucile dresses were not designed by her. Duff-Gordon's autobiography acknowledges that this had been the case since at least 1911.

By September 1922, she had ceased designing for the company, which effectively closed. A completely new 'Lucile' was formed, using the same premises in Paris, and different designs, but it gradually failed. Meanwhile, its founder (who continued to be known as 'Lucile') worked from private premises designing personally for individual clients. She was briefly associated with the firm of Reville, Ltd., maintained a ready-to-wear shop of her own and lent her name to a wholesale operation in America.

Duff-Gordon also continued as a fashion columnist and critic after her design career ended, contributing to London's Daily Sketch and Daily Express (1922–1930), and she penned her best-selling autobiography Discretions and Indiscretions (1932).

== Death ==
Duff-Gordon died of breast cancer, complicated by pneumonia, at a nursing home in Putney, London, on 20 April 1935, aged 71.

== Titles ==
- 1863–1884: Miss Lucy Christiana Sutherland
- 1884–1900: Mrs. James Stuart Wallace
- 1900–1935: Lucy, Lady Duff-Gordon
