= Abram Isaac Elkus =

American judge (1867–1947)

Abram I. Elkus
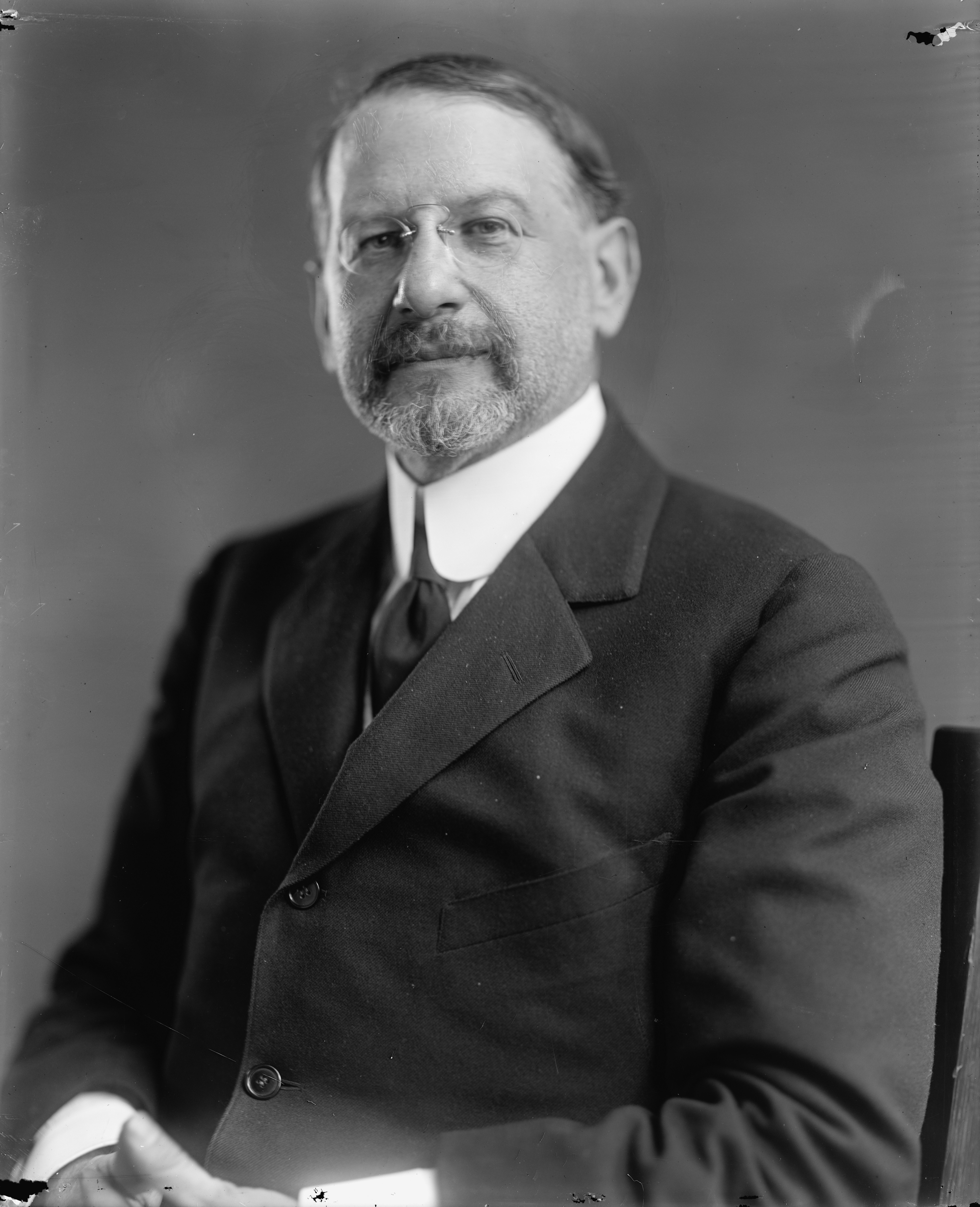
- Portrait by Harris & Ewing c. 1916–1917

5th United States Ambassador to the Ottoman Empire
- In office October 2, 1916 – April 20, 1917 (Note: Elkus, hampered by illness, did not leave his post until May 29, 1917.)
- President: Woodrow Wilson
- Preceded by: Henry Morgenthau Sr.
- Succeeded by: Joseph Grew (as Ambassador to Turkey)

Associate Judge of the New York Court of Appeals
- In office November 12, 1919 – December 31, 1920
- Appointed by: Alfred E. Smith
- Preceded by: William H. Cuddeback

Personal details
- Born: August 6, 1867 New York City
- Died: October 15, 1947 (aged 80) Red Bank, New Jersey
- Spouse: Gertrude R. Hess (m. 1896)
- Children: Katharine Elkus White
- Occupation: Lawyer, diplomat

Abram Isaac Elkus (August 6, 1867 – October 15, 1947), an American ambassador, judge, and public official, was one of the most prominent Jews in American government.

== Biography ==
Elkus was born in New York City on August 6, 1867, the son of Isaac and Julia Elkus, and brought up as an orthodox Jew. He was educated in the city's public schools as well as the College of the City of New York. He earned his law degree at Columbia Law School and was admitted to the bar in 1888.

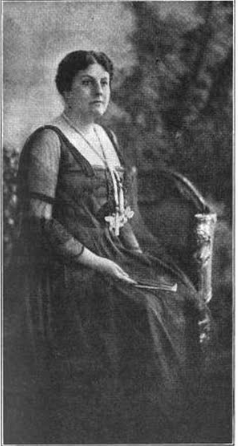
He married Gertrude R. Hess (1873-1953) in 1896.

In 1902, Elkus' firm James, Schell & Elkus, merged with a firm headed by Joseph M. Proskauer, creating the firm of Elkus, Gleason & Proskauer, a predecessor of the law firm of Proskauer Rose.

In 1910, Elkus was appointed Special Assistant to the United States Attorney for the prosecution of bankruptcy frauds. In 1911 he was Counsel for the New York State Factory Investigating Committee engaged in framing legislation dealing with child labor, working hours for women, fire protection, and similar safeguards for factory workers. Elkus was Chief Counsel for the state commission that investigated the Triangle Shirtwaist Factory fire.

He also served as Chairman of the Reconstruction Commission of this State that proposed a major reorganization of state government to Governor Alfred E. Smith, and for many years he served as a member of the State Board of Regents (which oversees the New York State education system).

In 1916 he was appointed by Woodrow Wilson to be the United States Ambassador to the Ottoman Empire in Constantinople. While there he also represented the interests of Great Britain, France, Italy, Russia, and Belgium which were then at war with the Ottomans. In April 1917, when the United States entered World War I against Germany, he was recalled, but serious illness prevented his homecoming for many months. The U.S. never declared war against the Ottoman Empire.

In 1913 and 1920, he ran for Judge of the New York Court of Appeals, but was twice defeated. On November 12, 1919, Governor Alfred E. Smith appointed him to fill the vacancy caused by the death of William H. Cuddeback. Elkus served on the court until December 31, 1920, and then accepted an appointment as one of the League of Nations Commissioners to settle the Åland Islands dispute between Finland and Sweden.

On October 15, 1947, he died at his home in Red Bank, New Jersey.

== Notes ==
Diplomatic posts
Preceded by Henry Morgenthau, Sr.	United States Ambassador to the Ottoman Empire; 1916–1917	Succeeded by Joseph Grew as Ambassador to Turkey
