= Emory A. Chase =

American judge

Emory Albert Chase
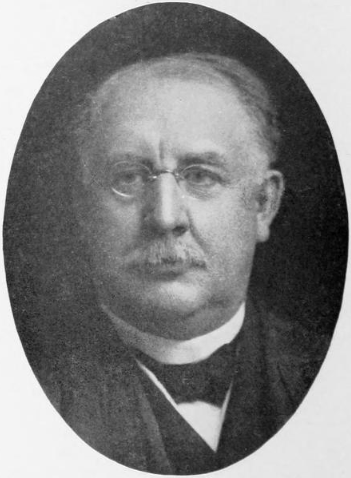

Judge of the New York Court of Appeals
- In office 1906–1921

Personal details
- Born: August 31, 1854 Windham, New York, US
- Died: June 25, 1921 (aged 66) Catskill, New York, US
- Profession: Lawyer and judge

Emory Albert Chase (August 31, 1854 – June 25, 1921) was an American lawyer and politician from New York.

== Biography ==
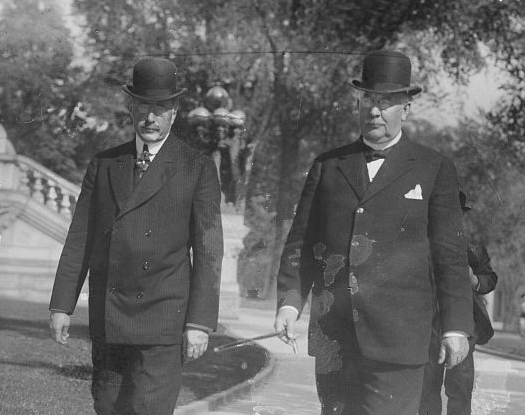
Chase and Frank H. Hiscock in 1913

He was born on August 31, 1854, to Albert Chase and Laura (Woodworth) Chase in Hensonville, New York. He attended the public school at Hensonville, and continued his studies at the Fort Edward Collegiate Institute, but did not graduate. He studied law in the office of Rufus H. King and Joseph Hallock in Catskill, and was admitted to the bar in 1880, and started work at the firm of Hallock & Jennings. In 1882 he joined the firm which became Hallock, Jennings & Chase. On June 30, 1885, he married Mary E. Churchill, and they had two children: Jessie Churchill Chase and Albert Woodworth Chase. After Hallock’s retirement in September 1890, his law firm continued as Jennings & Chase until December 1896.

He was a justice of the New York Supreme Court (3rd District) from 1897 to 1920, from 1900 on the Appellate Division, Third Dept.

In January 1906, he was designated by Governor Frank W. Higgins to the New York Court of Appeals under the amendment of 1899.

In 1912 and 1914, he ran on the Republican ticket for a regular seat on the Court of Appeals but was defeated twice. In 1920, he ran again and finally, in the meanwhile having become the senior associate judge, was elected to a fourteen-year term, but died a half year later on June 25, 1921, in Catskill, New York.
