= Charles W. Berry =

American physician, soldier, and New York City Comptroller

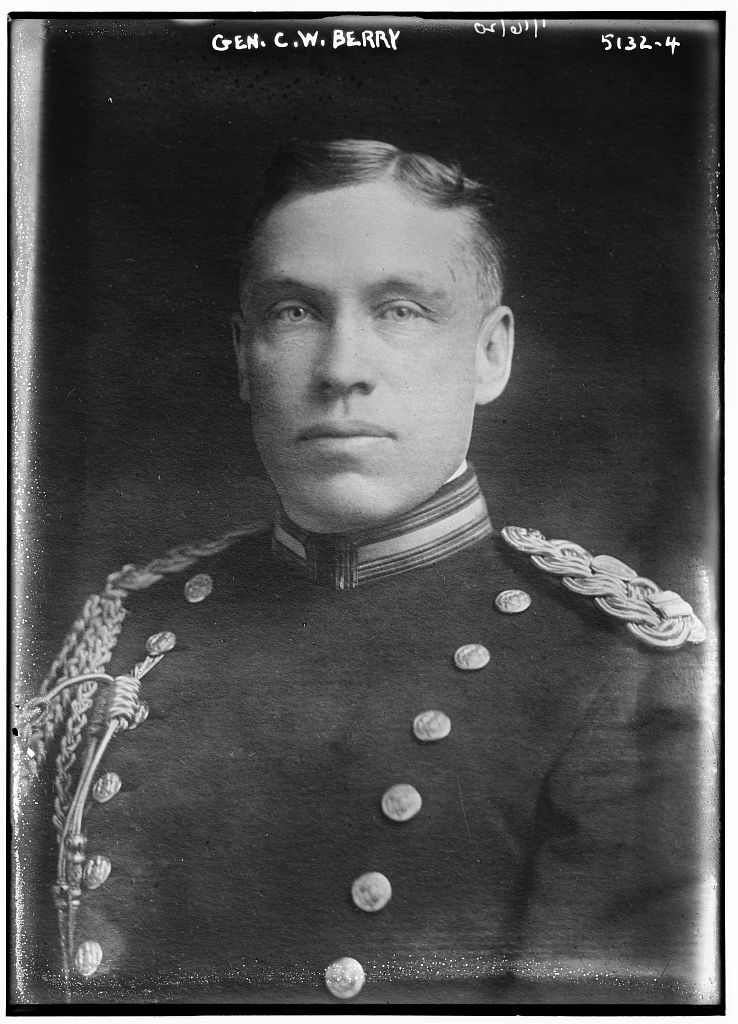
Berry in 1920. Bain News Service, Library of Congress

Charles White Berry (April 11, 1871 – April 30, 1941) was an American physician, soldier, and New York City Comptroller.

== Life ==
Berry was born on April 11, 1871, in Catskill, New York, the son of Frank M. Berry and Almira Horn. He moved to New York City with his parents when he was 9.

Berry graduated from Columbia University College of Physicians and Surgeons in 1896. He then began practicing medicine in Brooklyn, devoting much of his time to childhood diseases. He was heavily involved in public health, working for the New York City Department of Health and the New York State Department of Health as a diagnostician and epidemiologist. In 1917, he received a degree in doctor of public health from New York University. He also lectured at several medical schools, including the Belleuve Medical School, New York University Medical School, and Long Island University Brooklyn medical school.

In 1903, Berry enlisted in the New York National Guard, starting as a private in Company H. of the 7th New York Militia Regiment. He was quickly promoted through the ranks of corporal and sergeant and was honorably discharged in 1909. In 1911, when trouble was brewing with Mexico, he sought and obtained a commission as first lieutenant in the 14th Infantry. A year later, he was commissioned a captain. While serving he was commended by Major General Leonard Wood for having the most efficient company in the National Guard. From 1913 to 1914, he was an Aide to governor Martin H. Glynn. Shortly afterwards, he was mustered in to serve with the 14th Infantry during the Mexican Border War. He received an honorable discharge in 1916.

When America was preparing to enter World War I, Berry again enlisted as a private in the 14th Infantry. He was commissioned a major of infantry, transferred to the 106th Infantry, 27th Division, and set sail for France in May 1918. He commanded the 2nd Battalion of the 106th, stationed in the Ypres sector in Belgium. He was then promoted to lieutenant-colonel and transferred to the 105th Infantry. He led the regiment at Dickebusch Lake and the Battle of Vierstraat Ridge. He was second in command of the regiment in the Battle of the Hindenburg Line and the subsequent advance to Canal De La Sambre. After the Armistice was signed, he returned to the United States in November 1918. For his military service, he was awarded the Croix de guerre with Palms, the Conspicuous Service Cross, and was cited for gallantry in action.

In January 1919, New York governor Al Smith commissioned Berry Brigadier General and appointed him Adjutant General of New York. He served until 1920. In the 1920 New York state election, he was the Democratic candidate for New York State Comptroller. He lost to James A. Wendell. In 1923, Smith again appointed Berry Adjutant General of New York. In May 1923, Smith appointed him Major-General, Commander of the New York National Guard, to replace General John F. O'Ryan. He was succeeded as adjutant general by Edward J. Westcott.

In 1925, Berry was elected New York City Comptroller. He served from 1926 to 1933, serving under New York City mayors Jimmy Walker, Joseph V. McKee, and John P. O'Brien. Once he took office, he demanded a definite policy for financing the then-ongoing subway construction and urged it be done with long-term bonds instead of short-term ones. He also proposed a 10-cent subway fare to make the subway self-sustaining and help the city financially, but this proved unpopular. He merged several bureaus for tax collection in the New York City Department of Finance into a single bureau. He saved the city millions in the acquisition for of parks and school sites by ending the old method of acquiring the land through condemnation proceedings, and favored extending the city parks.

After retiring as Comptroller in September 1933, Berry briefly returned to practicing medicine. Poor health ended up keeping him at home, first in Dongan Hills, Staten Island and then in Charlottesville, Virginia.

In 1892, Berry married Maud E. Brower. Two of his sons, Charles White Jr. and Frank M., also fought in World War I, serving in the 1st Cavalry. His other children include George Gould, Allen J., William Meyer, Mrs. Albert L. Oppikofer, Mrs. Mary J. Maroney, and Martha J. By the time he died, he was married to Nina La Plante. His son George Gould was a general staff officer during World War II under Hugh A. Drum and Omar Bradley, a brigadier general, and chief of staff of the New York National Guard. He was a member of the New York Academy of Medicine, the American Public Health Association, the American Health Association, the American Legion, the Society of American Officers, the Military Order of the World War, and the Army and Navy Club of the United States.

Berry died at his home in Charlottesville on April 30, 1941. He was buried in Arlington National Cemetery with full military honors.

Party political offices
Preceded by Bird Sim Coler	Democratic nominee for New York State Comptroller; 1920	Succeeded by James W. Fleming
Political offices
Preceded by Charles Lacy Craig	New York City Comptroller; 1926–1933	Succeeded by George McAneny
