= William H. Cuddeback =

American judge (1852–1919)

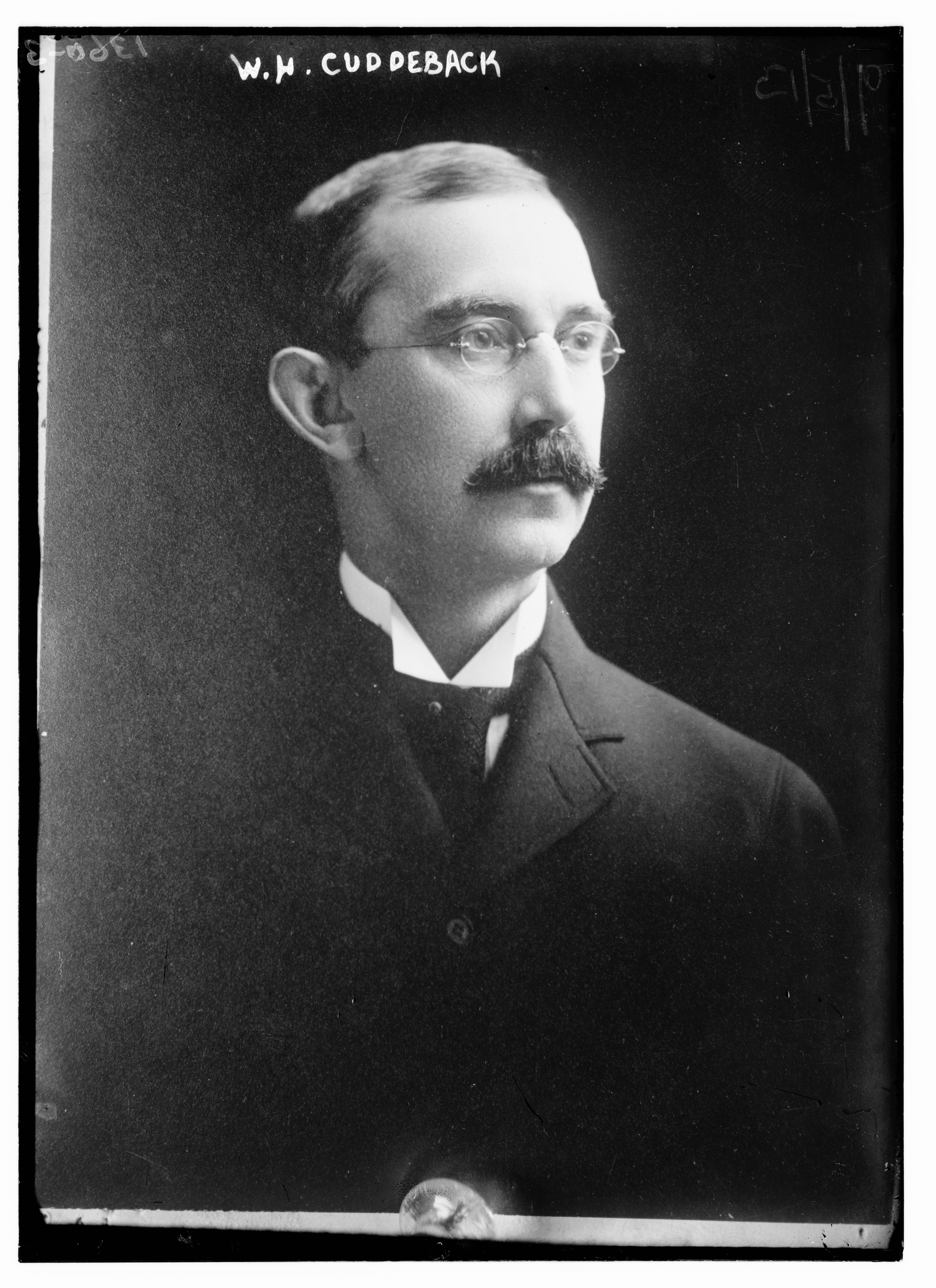

Associate Judge of the New York Court of Appeals
- In office 1913–1919
- Succeeded by: Abram Isaac Elkus

Personal details
- Born: William Herman Cuddeback; March 23, 1852 Deerpark, New York
- Died: August 16, 1919 (aged 67) Goshen, New York
- Party: Democratic
- Education: Cornell University
- Occupation: Jurist, politician

William Herman Cuddeback (March 23, 1852 – August 16, 1919) was an American lawyer and politician from New York, with his career culminating in his election to the New York Court of Appeals in 1912.

== Biography ==
He was born on March 23, 1852, in Deerpark, New York to Lewis Cuddeback (1807–1889) and Caroline Lee Thompson (1820–1877). He was educated at Goshen Academy and graduated from Cornell University in 1874. He was admitted to the bar in 1877, and practiced in Goshen until 1885, when he moved to Buffalo, New York. He was Chairman of the Democratic Committee of Buffalo from 1895 to 1896, and Corporation Counsel of Buffalo from 1898 to 1902.

In 1912, he was elected on the Democratic and Independence League tickets to the New York Court of Appeals, defeating Progressive George Kirchwey. During his tenure he concurred on landmark cases written by his colleague Benjamin Cardozo, including MacPherson v. Buick Motor Co. and Wood v. Lucy, Lady Duff-Gordon.

He died on August 16, 1919, in Goshen, New York.

He was succeeded by Abram I. Elkus whom Governor Alfred E. Smith appointed to complete his term.

He was buried in Slate Hill Cemetery in Goshen, New York.

== Sources ==
- Roots Web Entry
- Court of Appeals judges at The Historical Society of the Courts of New York State
- Bio at Court History
- Death notice, in NYT on August 18, 1919
