= Frederick E. Crane =

American judge (1869–1947)

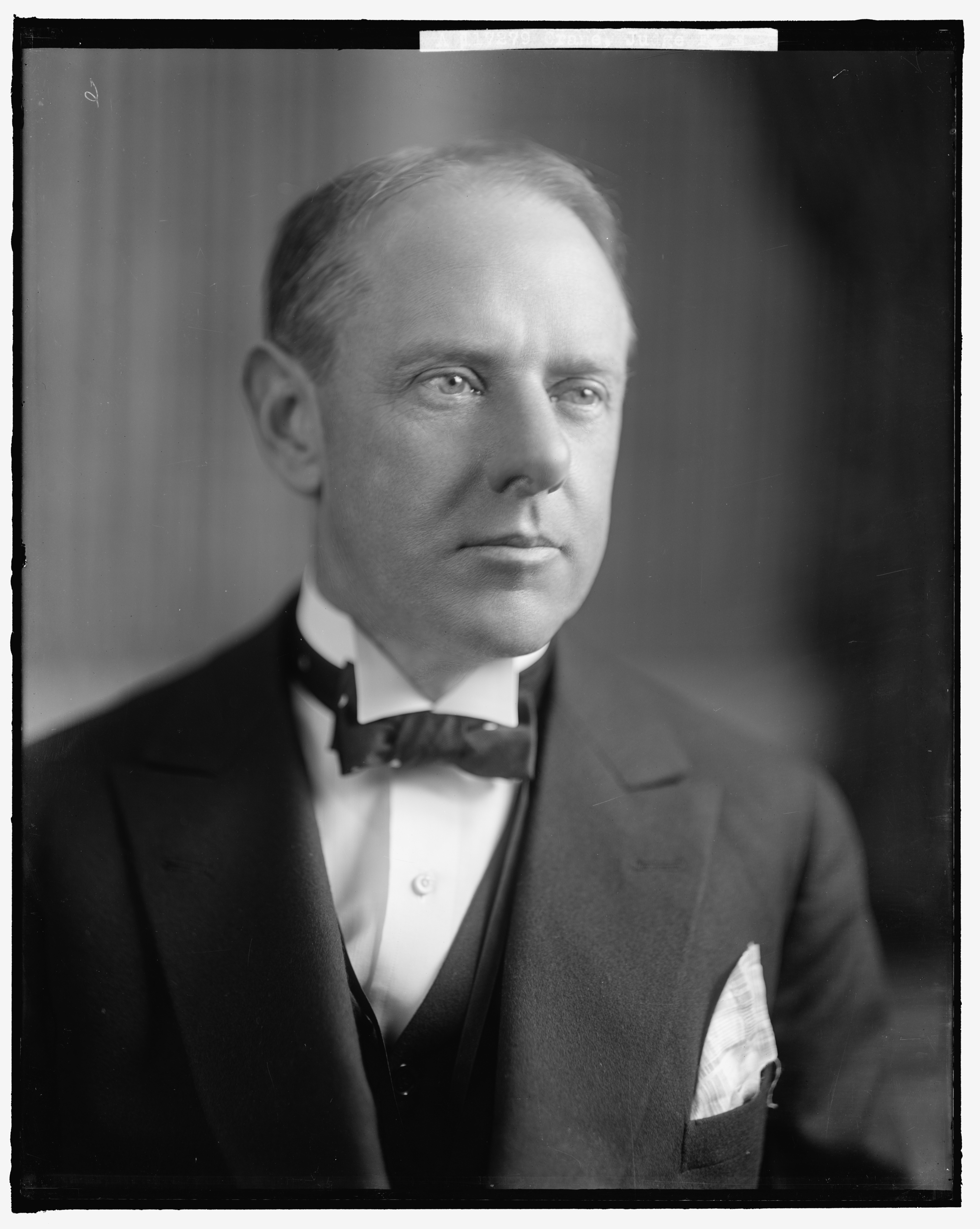
- Crane, 1905–1945

Chief Judge of the New York Court of Appeals
- In office January 1, 1935 – December 31, 1939
- Preceded by: Cuthbert W. Pound
- Succeeded by: Irving Lehman

Personal details
- Born: March 2, 1869 New York City, New York, U.S.
- Died: November 21, 1947 (aged 78) Garden City, New York, U.S.
- Party: Republican
- Education: Columbia University (LLB)

Frederick Evan Crane (March 2, 1869 – November 21, 1947) was an American lawyer and politician from New York. He was Chief Judge of the New York Court of Appeals from 1935 to 1939.

== Life ==
Growing up, Crane attended Grammar School No. 35, a public school in New York City. He attended Columbia University Law School, where he graduated with an LL.B. He married Gertrude Craven, from Montreal, and they had a daughter Dorothy Braddock Crane.

He was a judge of the Kings County Court from 1902 to 1906, elected on the Fusion ticket headed by Seth Low for Mayor of New York City.

He was a justice of the New York Supreme Court from 1907 to 1920, elected on the Republican ticket. In 1913, in a suit for separation brought by Gardner L. Field against his wife Adelaide, Justice Crane held that a household is managed by the wife, not by the mother of the husband, and that a wife is not obliged to live with the husband if a mother-in-law makes the home unpleasant. He dismissed the suit, dealing a "crushing blow to the mother-in-law system." In 1918, he issued a ruling which allowed doctors to prescribe contraception.

In January 1917, he was appointed a judge of the New York Court of Appeals under the Amendment of 1899. In 1920, he was elected to a 14-year term on the Court of Appeals. In 1934, he was elected Chief Judge on the Republican and Democratic tickets. He was the President of the New York State Constitutional Convention of 1938. He retired from the bench at the end of 1939 when he reached the constitutional age limit of 70 years.

He was buried at the Kensico Cemetery in Valhalla, New York.

His sister Ida Elizabeth Crane was married to Judge Edwin Louis Garvin.

== Sources ==
- The justices-elect, in NYT on December 5, 1906
- Resignation from County Court, in NYT on December 27, 1906
- His daughter's engagement, in NYT on July 12, 1916
- Listing of Court of Appeals judges, with portrait
- State Court Biography

Legal offices
Preceded by Cuthbert W. Pound	Chief Judge of the New York Court of Appeals; 1935–1939	Succeeded by Irving Lehman
