= Salgo v. Leland Stanford Jr. University Board of Trustees =

1957 U.S. court case establishing "informed consent"

Salgo v. Leland Stanford Jr., University Board of Trustees
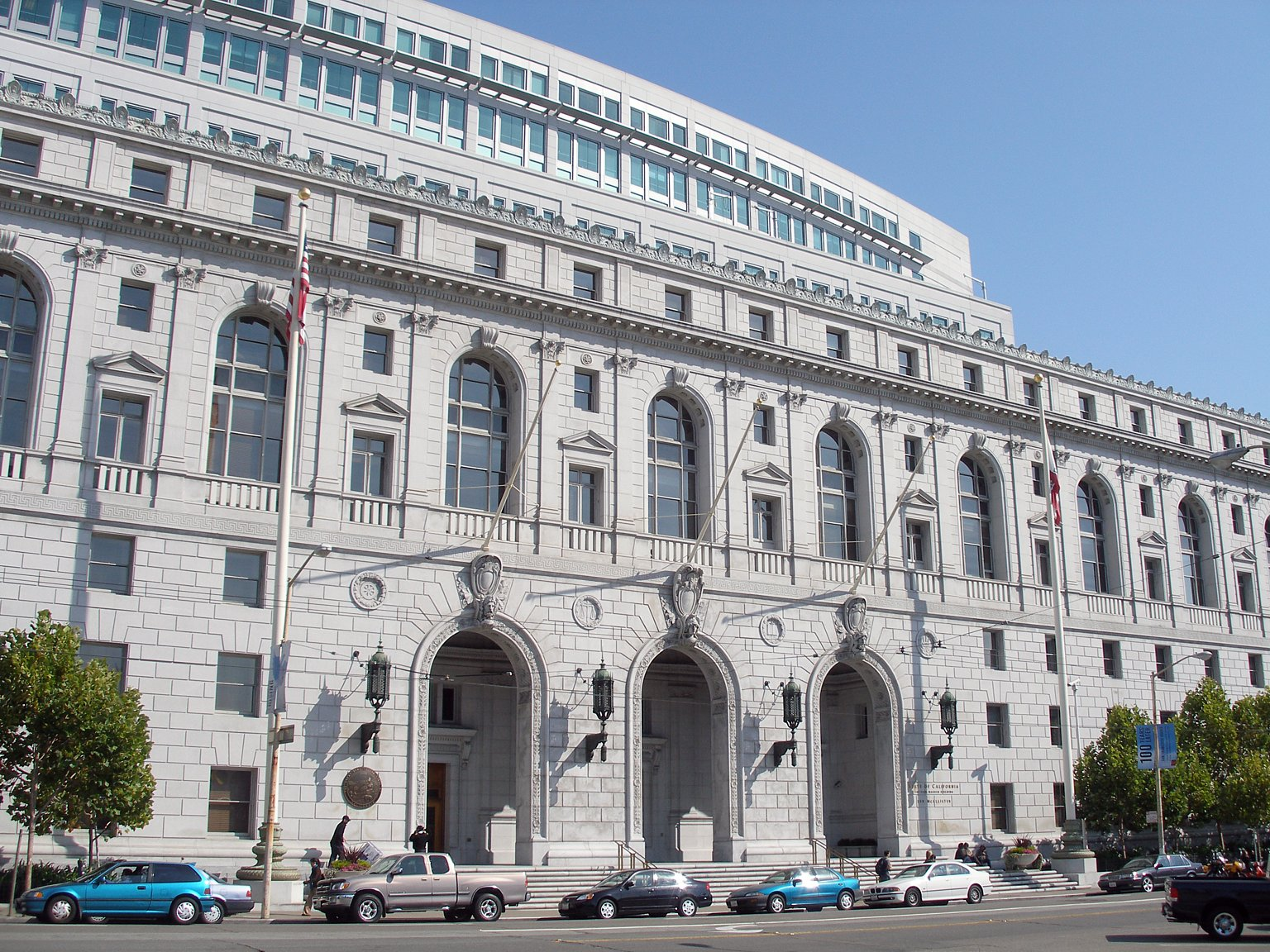
- Supremecourtofcaliforniamaincourthouse California's first district court of appeals also resides within the California Supreme Court.
- Court: Court of Appeals of California, First District, Division One
- Decided: 1957
- Citations: 154 Cal. App. 2d 560; 317 P.2d 170

Case history
- Prior action: Scholendorff v. Society of New York Hospital
- Subsequent actions: The rehearing was denied 12 November 1957, and the petition to the Supreme Court was rejected 18 December 1957.

Holding
- Martin Salgo was awarded $250,000 for malpractice against Leland Stanford Jr. University Board of Trustees and Dr. Frank Gerbode. This amount was reduced to $213,355 by the trial court.

Salgo v. Leland Stanford Jr. University Board of Trustees was a 1957 court case that helped to establish what the practice of informed consent was supposed to look like in the practice of modern medicine. This was evaluated with respect to the California Court of Appeals case where Martin Salgo sued the trustees of Stanford University and Stanford physician Dr. Frank Gerbode for malpractice as he claimed that they did not inform him nor his family of the details and risks associated with an aortogram which left him permanently paralyzed in his lower extremities.

The decision in Salgo v. Leland Stanford Jr. University Board of Trustees coined the term "informed consent" in addition to helping to establish what informed consent should look like in modern day practice. At the time, the concept of informed consent was relatively new with the first court cases helping to distinguish it coming to light in the early 20th century. This caused a shift in the idea of what role a physician upheld for their patients from protecting them from harm (physician-advocate) to becoming an advocate for their patient (patient advocate), helping and providing them with the necessary information to make an intelligent, informed decision rather than making a decision in their best interest without consultation. This led to a larger incorporation of the patient in the decision-making process, allowing them to voice their personal values, preferences, fears, and expectations for the procedure.

Although the idea of consent was already established through Walter Reed's "Consent Form," Nuremberg Doctors' Trials, and Schloendroff v. Society of New York Hospital (1914), it had yet to be fully incorporated into practice and the limits of disclosure had yet to be determined at the time of Salgo v. Leland Stanford Jr. University Board of Trustees.

As a result of the decision in the case, Martin Salgo (55 years old) was awarded $250,000 against Stanford University Hospitals and Dr. Frank Gerbode: The trial court later reduced the amount to $213,355.

== History ==
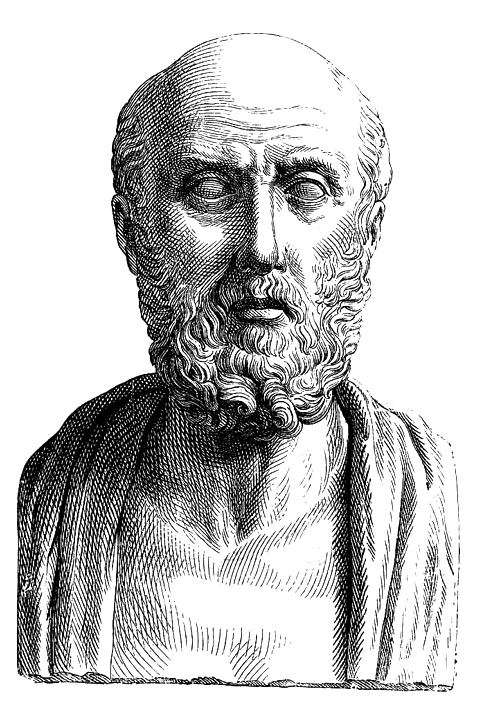
Hippocratic beliefs tended to focus on the physician making decisions for the patient to prevent them from any harm or injustice that could arise.

Informed consent is a product of an attempt to include patients in their own treatment planning, allowing them to make decisions for themselves, provided that they are able-minded adults. Previously, it was believed that it was the role of the physician to protect their patient from harm as suggested in the Hippocratic oath: "first, do no harm." Medical historians have stated that in practice, this previously included the idea of mental harm and that this was done by specifically not sharing information that could cause mental harm.

It was not until the Enlightenment movement in the 18th and 19th centuries that it was believed that patients were sufficiently educated to understand their doctors' requirements and prescriptions. However, doctors explained what to do and what was occurring to their patients to help them better follow their prescriptions rather than decide for themselves. It was still not believed that patients could reliably form their own opinions nor make appropriate medical decisions for themselves.

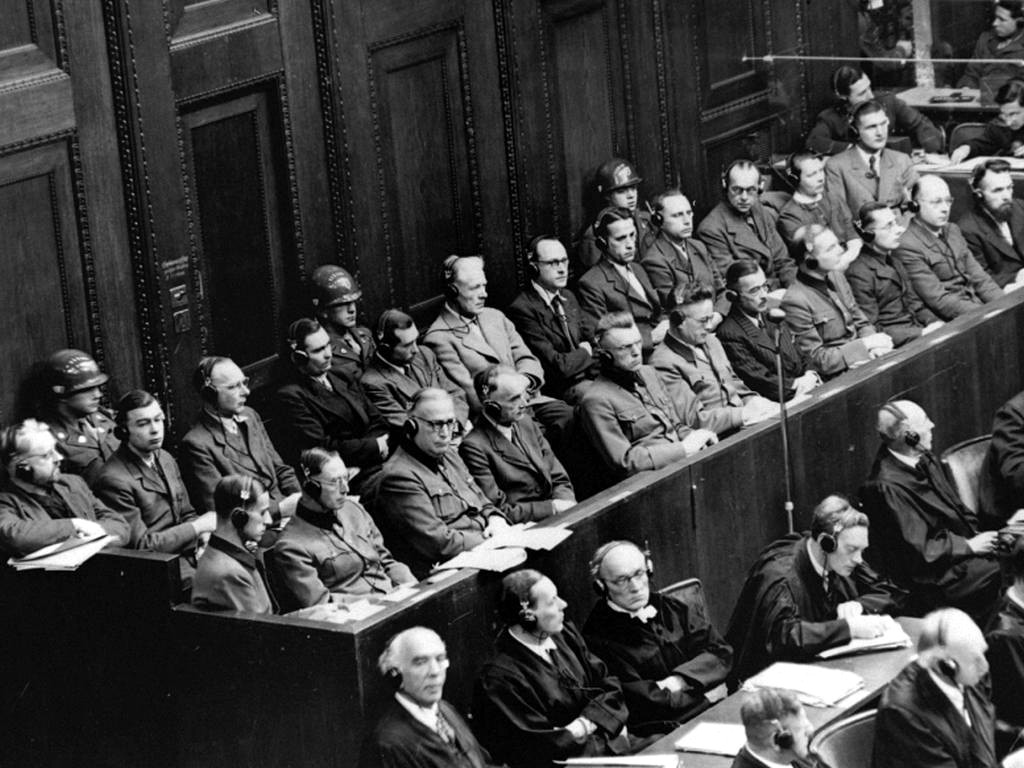
The Doctors' Trial held in Nuremberg, Germany, from December 9, 1946, to August 20, 1947. This case helped to pave the way for the discussion about informed consent.

Timeline to Establish Informed Consent
| Court Case | Year | Significance |
|---|---|---|
| Schloendorff v. Society of New York Hospital | 1914 | This case used the idea of self-determination to articulate the need for consent from patients. |
| Nuremberg Doctors' Trial | 1946 | This determined that consent must be voluntary, competent, informed, and comprehending for human subjects in studies requiring human test subjects. |
| Salgo v. Leland Stanford Jr., University Board of Trustees | 1957 | This case coined the term "informed consent" by emphasizing the need for recognizable and adequate consent. |
| Natanson v. Kline | 1960 | This helped establish what was required to be disclosed before a procedure, helping to set the boundaries of informed consent. Negligence could be used in informed consent cases. |
| Cobbs v. Grant | 1972 | This case caused the courts to define consent as being patient-based: "what would a competent patient need to know to make a rational decision." |
| Canterbury v. Spence | 1972 | This was another influential informed consent case where the (unsuccessful) plaintiff claimed that they were not sufficiently warned of the potential dangers. |

== Procedure ==
=== Evaluation ===
Martin Salgo (55) visited Dr. Gerbode, a specialist in arterial disease, at the recommendation of his physician with complaints of a limp caused by cramping in his legs, mainly calves, in addition to right side abdominal pain and discomfort in his lower back and hip with exercise. Despite taking medication prescribed by his physician for a year, his condition worsened. Upon evaluation on 31 December 1953, Gerbode observed that Salgo looked much older than 55; his blood pressure was 180/90; the legs blanched when raised, suggesting atrophy; the right leg was blue; there was no distinguishable pulse below the femoral pulse on his right side and only weakly present on the left. This led Gerbode to assume that the blood supply to the legs was impaired, causing him to diagnose Salgo with abdominal aorta occlusion. After talking about the seriousness of the case, Gerbode recommended that he stay in the hospital for further evaluation.

=== Preliminary diagnosis ===
Salgo was told that they would study his aorta and x-ray the gastrointestinal tract in an attempt to find the block to perform the correct operation which would help to improve circulation.

An image taken during an aortogram. Dr. Ellis, Dr. Bengle, Dr. Andrews, and technicians performed a diagnostic aortogram on Salgo.

=== Hospital visit and procedure ===
After being admitted on 6 January 1954, a series of x-rays of the chest and calcification suggested that Salgo had been afflicted for an extended period of time. A day later (1/7/1954), Dr. Ellis — a surgeon at the university hospital with five years of experience with special diagnostic procedures — informed Salgo that he would be performing an aortogram by injecting contrast material into the aorta which would allow them to take pictures of the circulatory system. Unfortunately, the procedure was postponed due to the presence of residual barium from his previous x-rays, which were taken after his arrival at the hospital. After it was determined that there was not any more barium in his system, they proceeded with the surgery on 8 January 1954 under the supervision of Dr. Ellis (surgeon), Dr. Bengle (anesthesiologist), Dr. Andrews (radiologist), and technicians. Dr. Gerbode stopped in for the first part before leaving.

Before injecting the 70% sodium urokon into the back of the patient while face down, a sensitivity test was performed with radiopaque material. The 70% sodium urokon injection was repeated with 30 c.c.'s and then with 20 c.c.'s in an attempt to get a clear picture of the blockage.

At 5 p.m., Dr. Gerbode was informed by Dr. Ellis that the procedure was a success. Salgo woke up paralyzed in the lower extremities the next day.

== Court arguments ==
=== Sodium urokon dosage ===
In court it was argued by the plaintiff (Salgo) that the defendants were negligent, as the manufacturer label states that "'10 to 15 cc of 70% Urokon is adequate' and that the procedure should not be repeated within 24 hours." There was disagreement as to how to classify the second injection and if the second dosage could be classified as a second injection. The plaintiff claimed that inserting two separate amounts of 70% sodium urokon classified as two injections, while the defendants stated that the needle was not actually injected twice as there was not actually a second needle inserted. Additional disagreement from defendants and amicus curiae determined that, in practice, the amount of sodium urokon actually used — contrary to the manufacturer label — varied between 30 and 70 c.c.'s.

=== Validity of the procedure ===
It was also debated whether an aortogram with sodium urokon was correct under these conditions. But, it was pointed out that the plaintiff's general practitioner referred him to Dr. Gerbode because of his specialty in vascular surgery. A specialist called on to testify helped determine that an aortography was a normal procedure under the circumstances.

=== Disclosure of procedural details ===
The plaintiff and his family also claimed that they were not notified of the potential risks and practices associated with the procedure. Despite contradicting that they did disclose information to the patient, Dr. Gerbode and Dr. Ellis admitted that neither details nor dangers were fully explained. However, during Salgo's case, it had not yet been clarified in court what was needed for a patient to be considered "reasonably informed." Later, this became a balance between giving the patient enough information to make a knowledgeable decision without inundating them with jargon and information and postulating too much into hypotheticals while making sure that they are aware of risks and alternatives.

== Decision ==
=== Res ipsa loquitur ===
Salgo v. Leland Stanford Jr. University Board of Trustees went through the California Court of Appeals, first district, division one.

The court determined that the res ipsa loquitur doctrine (Latin for "the thing speaks for itself") was applicable to this case, meaning that Salgo was able to meet the burden of proof for negligence and that his paralysis was caused by something under the control of the doctors.

=== Liability ===
However, Gerbode himself was not held liable as there was not explicit agreement that he would perform the surgery and under the presumption that it is common practice for the attending physician to not be present for the procedure. Furthermore, Gerbode did not perform the procedure, but rather the hospital staff. As a result, Salgo was awarded $250,000 (later reduced to $213,355 in the trial court) from Stanford University Hospital.

== Subsequent developments ==
This helped to set a precedent for the following cases in terms of the patient is adequately informed. If there was a failure to disclose information, danger, and alternatives, there was cause for legal action. However, what adequate information looked like would be established with later cases. The court argued that it was the physicians' responsibility to inform their patients, albeit the court admitted that full disclosure is not advisable under all situations where divulging information to the patient may result in psychological or other harm for the patient.

The court said: "A physician violates his duty to protect his patient and subjects himself to liability if he withholds any factors which are necessary to form the basis of an intelligent consent by the patient to the proposed treatment. Likewise, the physician may not minimize the known dangers of a procedure or operation in order to induce his patient's consent."
