= Rule of seven =

Rule of seven may refer to

- "The Magical Number Seven, Plus or Minus Two", a highly cited paper in psychology
- The "half-your-age-plus-seven" rule
- Rule of sevens, establishing age brackets for determining capacity to give informed assent or to commit crimes or torts
