= Dynamic consent =

Dynamic consent is an interactive approach to informed consent in research that enables users to manage their data in real-time. It is designed to address issues raised by the use of digital technologies in research and clinical care, enabling the linkage, analysis and integration of diverse datasets, as well as the application of AI and big data analyses. Dynamic consent was designed to foster better engagement between researchers and participants, giving participants the option to take part or to opt of studies; to improve understanding of how the participants' data is being used, and to increase legal and regulatory requirements for managing the secondary use of data in biobanks and other medical research infrastructures. The approach started to be implemented in 2007 by an Italian group who introduced live interaction between researcher and participant. The use of digital interfaces in this way was first described as 'Dynamic Consent' in the EnCoRe project (see below).

== Background ==
Researchers are required to obtain informed consent from potential participants before any research begins, according to the Declaration of Helsinki. Traditionally, this has been done through a paper consent form, which is accompanied by a subject information sheet describing the risks and benefits of participation in the research. Additionally, these forms outline how the participant's data will be protected and their privacy maintained, constituting a formal agreement. Participants should be informed about the purpose(s) for which their data will (or may) be used; where it will be stored; the expected retention time; if any other parties are involved; the amount and the sensitivity of the information exchanged; whether the data will be shared onward to yet other parties; whether the consent to use these data can be revoked. Consent to data processing is also a requirement of data protection and privacy laws in most countries.

Today, research data is often being collected online in large data sets, including genetic databases and registries, electronic health records, biobanks, and digital services and databases. This date is used for research projects, public health assessments, marketing, the design of algorithms and data mining.

The storage and use of data online raises privacy challenges. Participants often sign a broad consent or a blanket consent form. Blanket consent means that a person effectively agrees to permit the use of their data once it is provided. Broad consent is more common and involves agreeing to a broad set of potential future uses under a particular governance framework. Broad consent has become the standard practice in many genetic registries and biobanks. Its legal and ethical adequacy has been questioned.

== Operation ==
Dynamic consent is a personalised digital interface to facilitate participant engagement in clinical and research activities over time. It seeks to address some of the issues raised by the traditional, paper-based, static consent approach, where consent must be obtained for all future activities in a face-to-face interview. Dynamic consent operates through a secure IT interface for consent and communication that enables participants to view a digital record of their consent decisions, subsequent to their initial agreement. Some versions of dynamic consent also have the functionality for people to personalise according to their preferences, which can be changed at any time.

Further, dynamic consent aims to put people in control of their data and how it is used, reflecting patient-centric initiatives happening elsewhere in medical research. Through the tool, participants can consent to new projects or change their consent choices; they can complete surveys and receive information about research findings. Preferences are linked with a participant's samples and data, and so if these are shared, so are the individual's preferences. It enables people to give a range of different kinds of consent, for example, a broad consent to low-risk epidemiological research or an explicit consent to a new, high-risk proposal. This flexibility is enabled by the digital interface, where preferences can be changed in line with new situations.

Dynamic consent may facilitate recruitment in research, as information is provided to potential participants in a user-friendly and standardised way across research sites and irrespective of the participants' geographical location. Dynamic consent enables two-way, ongoing communication between researchers and research participants. For instance, research participants are able to upload additional health data, or researchers may inform participants about new research opportunities or findings. Such ongoing interface may increase the participants' understanding of research and positively impact retention rates. Dynamic consent may be useful in supporting Indigenous data sovereignty and supporting culturally-acceptable data governance in health research involving Indigenous people and communities.

== What makes dynamic consent dynamic? ==
This digital interface is dynamic because individuals can:

- Give different kinds of consents (e.g. broad, explicit, specific) to different activities
- Change their consent preferences to the use of their samples and information in real time in response to their changing circumstances
- Enrol in new studies or engage in self-reported research
- Receive up-to-date information on how their samples and data are being used and on the progress and outcomes of research
- Tailor the way they receive information, change these preferences over time and have a record of all transactions in one place
- Be contacted easily by researchers when there is a protocol change, their opinion is needed, or a new consent is required.

== Examples of dynamic consent ==
=== First Genetic Trust ===
In 2001, First Genetic Trust (FGT) put forward the idea that they act as a 'broker' of genetic information. They would be a third party between people taking part in research that involved their genetic data and those carrying out the research. FGT recommended a method that would protect 'the confidentiality of individual medical and genetic information, allowing access to select information and the use or application of an individual's DNA only when the patient has given specific consent.' This system has characteristics of dynamic consent before the term was coined.

=== EnCoRe ===
The EnCoRe (Ensuring Consent and Revocation) project was launched in 2008 and operated until 2012. It was funded by the Engineering and Physical Sciences Research Council (EPSRC), the Economic and Social Research Council (ESRC) and the UK government's Technology Strategy Board. Institutional partners for the project included Hewlett-Packard (and specifically the Hewlett-Packard Systems Security Lab in Bristol), the Warwick Manufacturing Group at the University of Warwick, QinetiQ, HW Communications, HeLEX from the University of Oxford and the London School of Economics.

The project's aim was to provide participants with more control over their personal data disclosed to organisations, with an overall vision to making giving and revoking consent more simplified and secure. This was a response to the issues posed by blanket and consent, with organisations bypassing obtaining new consent before using participants' personal data. EnCoRe aimed to enable people to determine what their information is used for, who it is shared with and for how long and where it is stored.

Three case studies were carried out as part of the EnCore project, each with different requirements for consent and revocation. A technical architecture was produced for each scenario, setting out all the functions needed for the management (including capture and revocation) and enforcement of individuals' consents.

The term 'dynamic consent' was coined by Professor Jane Kaye's team of the EnCoRe project at the University of Oxford.

=== InBank ===
Over time, the focus of dynamic consent has shifted from enabling participants to change their consent preferences to incorporating it as part of a larger apparatus that facilitates communication between participants and researchers or health professionals. The InBank team at the University of Manchester looked at dynamic consent as a way of collecting and sharing electronic health records. The work was UK-focused, considering dynamic consent in the context of the NHS and positioning it as a device to increase or restore public trust. The public scandal over the care. data initiative was positioned as evidence of a trust deficit, and equally that it showed a lack of transparent and accountable governance of people's personal medical records in the UK.

=== RUDY ===
RUDY is a study of rare diseases led by researchers at the University of Oxford. RUDY is an internet-based platform that enables registration and capture of patient-reported outcome measures (PROMs) and events to be done online within a dynamic consent framework.

=== CHRIS ===
The CHRIS (Cooperative Health Research in South Tyrol) Study is a prospective epidemiological study investigating chronic conditions, particularly cardiovascular, metabolic, neurological and psychiatric diseases and was the first study to implement dynamic consent in biobanking. It describes itself as 'a true partnership between the people participating, the staff working in the healthcare system and the research personnel'. The study is designed to be longitudinal, so a dynamic consent process was set up which enables participants to receive ongoing information about the project as well as an interactive consent webpage with dynamic options.

=== PEER ===
In the US, the Platform for Engaging Everyone Responsibly (PEER) has been set up by a non-profit health advocacy organisation , Genetic Alliance and software company Private Access. Not only can participants choose to consent to only some aspects of research and not to others, but they can also specify preferences for types of data access by third parties and consent to other activities that are offered, such as the use of their biological samples after death.

=== CTRL ===
In Australia, the Australian Genomic Health Alliance (Australian Genomics) has developed and is trialling a dynamic consent platform called 'CTRL' for people participating in genomic research.

== Challenges to dynamic consent ==
Some empirical studies that were carried out before dynamic consent was developed concluded that it is unnecessary, indicating that study participants agree to give broad or 'one-off' consent for certain kinds of research. For example, a face-to-face interview study of 1001 Scottish adults as part of the prospective Scottish Family Health Study genetic database carried out in 2009 found that respondents preferred 'scenarios where consent is only asked for at the start of the study' over options to renew consent every 5 or 10 years.

Similarly, a survey of US adults published in 2010 reported a preference for a broad, 'one-off' consent at the time of donation to a biobank over giving specific consent for each new study. A meta-analysis of the qualitative sociological literature on public and patient attitudes to biobanking published 2002-9 reached a similar conclusion: 'few people demanded recurrent, project-specific consent and few wished to place limits on the uses to which their tissue could be put'. However, these studies did not present dynamic consent to their respondents as an alternative to a broad consent.

There has been criticism of dynamic consent by a Norwegian team of researchers, who argued that it would be an unwanted burden on participants and a waste of time for researchers. In a dynamic consent model, participants will be asked for consent continuously, simply because each new project is a new project. Thus, they will be asked to re-consent both for trivial and essential reasons, and often the former'. However, this opinion was based on an erroneous understanding of dynamic consent as requiring consent for each new study, rather than being able to be tailored to the needs and ethical requirements of a particular study.

Steinsbekk et al. in their publication criticising dynamic consent also argued that rather than increasing the number of people taking part in research, dynamic consent may have the opposite effect. 'Being confronted with the detailed complexity of biomedical research, and being asked again and again for an 'opinion' (a consent), it is likely that at least some people will struggle with feelings of falling short – that their own competence or knowledge does not suffice. This could easily be interpreted as a 'lack of respect' for the passive participant, and result in lower participation as people would rather choose to stay away from such studies than face shortcomings.'

Researchers raise concerns about the impact of consent withdrawal (more easily facilitated by dynamic consent) on the integrity of their research data sets. There are also questions about the equity impacts of a dynamic consent approach, including fears that the 'digital divide' may impede its utility for some participants. One paper has looked at the potential use of a dynamic consent approach in relation to legacy collections of human tissue and data from Australian Aboriginal and Torres Strait Islander peoples, noting that access to the internet and suitable technology may be a challenge in remote communities. The increasing need for a consent mechanism that can accommodate family or other group-based decision making instead of or in addition to individual consent presents another avenue for the development of dynamic consent.

=== Rebuttals ===
There are a number of important limitations to consider when evaluating the results of studies of consent practices. In many cases, while a statistically significant preference for one form of consent over another can be found, this is not necessarily indicative of a clear majority preference. For example, Haddow et al., 2011, characterised their reported consent preferences as 'not strong'. Another study reported that while 58% of respondents described re-consent as 'a waste of time', 51% also felt that being asked for it was an indication that they were 'respected and involved' research participants.

In the case of prospective public attitude surveys on biobanking, of which there are many in the existing literature, Johnsson et al., 2010, found that reported willingness to share data and tissue for research was prone to both overestimating and underestimating recorded participation levels in different cases, leading to questions about the usefulness of this type of research in making predictions of future behaviours.

== Evaluation of dynamic consent ==
Researchers have proposed an evaluation and reporting framework for dynamic consent in order to support and structure future assessment of the effects of the approach. Australian Genomics is evaluating the effects of its 'CTRL' platform compared with standard consent processes. A 10-year evaluation of the concept by Mascalzoni et al. found that even though a low change rate was reported in the baseline, participants valued the possibility of changing their informed consent choices.
