= Informed assent =

Process whereby minors may agree to participate in clinical trials

The term informed assent describes the process whereby minors or individuals not competent to give legally-valid informed consent may agree to participate in clinical trials.

== Background ==
In adult medical research, the term informed consent is used to describe a state whereby a competent individual, having been fully informed about the nature, benefits and risks of a clinical trial, agrees to their own participation. National authorities define certain populations as vulnerable and therefore unable to provide informed consent, such as those without the necessary cognitive, psychological, or social maturity to understand these benefits and risks. The oft-reported belief that minors (for the purposes of this discussion, read minors as persons under the age of 18 years) are considered a vulnerable population and therefore may not autonomously provide informed consent, is actually an oversimplification that does not always hold true. In fact, the requirements for children participating in clinical trials are somewhat indistinct, with freedom to vary both between countries and within countries. For this reason, two terms have sprung into existence: pediatric consent and pediatric assent.

== Geographic variation ==
=== In United States ===
William G. Bartholome, MD, drafted the first statement for pediatric participation presented to the original American Academy of Pediatrics (AAP) Committee on Bioethics in 1985. The U.S. Food and Drug Administration encourages clinical trials in children in order to ensure the development of safe and effective pediatric medicines. According to the relevant Code of Federal Regulations (45 CFR 46, Subpart d), investigators wishing to conduct clinical trials in children in the United States are required to seek the permission of both parents and patients. This regulation defines informed assent as "a child's affirmative agreement to participate in research" and stipulates that mere failure to object cannot, without affirmative agreement, be taken as assent.

However, 45 CFR 46 does not specify an exact age at which informed assent must be obtained. Instead, it places responsibility for this determination with hospitals’ own Institutional Review Boards (IRBs). Increasingly, many such IRBs are adopting the ‘Rule of Sevens,’ which has formed part of common law for centuries and divides a child's life into three sections: birth to seven, seven to fourteen, and fourteen to twenty one years old. Before 7 years old children are said to lack the cognitive development necessary for autonomous decision-making. At age 7 years children are considered able to distinguish right from wrong. Adolescents 14 years old and above are legally and socially accountable for their actions. Although not law, meaning physicians can choose to ignore it, the rule of sevens is recommended by organizations including the American Academy of Pediatrics and adopted in various jurisdictions.

=== In European Union ===
Unless a waiver is granted, the European Medicines Agency mandates that drug companies prepare Pediatric Investigation Plans (PIPs) and conduct clinical trials that will ensure their products are safe and effective in children. According to the International Conference on Harmonisation of Technical Requirements for Registration of Pharmaceuticals for Human Use Topic E11, Investigators wishing to conduct such trials within the European Union are required to seek the permission of both parents and patients. The recommendations of the Ethics Working Group of the Confederation of European Specialists in Paediatrics (CESP) places the onus of deciding at what age assent should be required is delegated on the Independent Ethical Committees for each study or individual healthcare institution, but a general convention has arisen to use the rough ‘rule of sevens’ described above.

== Format and content ==
Generally, separate information and assent forms should be provided for the patient and their parents. According to CESP, child-focused forms should include all the elements and considerations generally required for seeking informed consent of competent adults. Additionally, it should conform to their intellectual capacity to understand the reason for the research and the risks therein, and the family should be given sufficient time and information to consider the pros and cons of their involvement. A child should also be aware they are able to withdraw willingly from the trial at any time. All this information must be presented in a style and format appropriate to the child's individual level of understanding. This means being tailored to the child's age, social environment, psychological and intellectual maturity, hence specialist companies have arisen to serve the need of providing specialized pediatric study information.

== Non-assent and controversy ==
Although the premise of pediatric consent using the rule of sevens is widely used and recognized as a practicable and ethical solution, it is not difficult to cite instances where it should not or has not applied, for example:

1. A child under 7 years old who is vehemently uncooperative with an aspect of a trial (such as a painful or uncomfortable assessment) may be removed from the trial by an investigator, i.e. be privilege to dissent.
2. A child over 7 years old who declines treatment for a devastating childhood illness and is therefore in mortal danger, might have their dissent overridden and have treatment forced upon them.
3. A child over 14 years old may be able to provide their own informed consent, independent of their parents. The legal precedent is that as an emancipated minor they may consent to any medical procedure they see fit (E.g., Carter v. Cangello, 105 Cal App 3d 348, 164 Cal Rptr 361, 1980).
4. A child who does not wish to undergo treatment, and nor do their parents wish treatment for them, may be ordered to do so by the courts under child neglect laws.

There have been instances where the failure to obtain proper assent (or even parental consent) has been directly opposed to the interests of the patient. In late 2000, the Washington Post broke the story of a 10-year-old girl who died during a meningitis clinical study conducted in Kano, Nigeria, by the drug giant Pfizer. The story described the slow death of the girl while researchers, who were testing Pfizer's antibiotic Trovan (trovafloxacin), monitored her dying without modifying her treatment. The Post also alleged other such corporation-sponsored experiments “in Africa, Asia, Eastern Europe, and Latin America” that were “poorly regulated,” “dominated by private interests” and “far too often betray” their promises to research subjects and consumers. The trial was performed without informed consent.

Initially, Pfizer successfully argued in court both that there was no international norm requiring its physicians to obtain informed consent for clinical trials and that any lawsuit brought against them relating to the trial should be tried in Nigerian courts, not U.S. courts. Pfizer abandoned this second claim in 2006, when a Nigerian Ministry of Health internal report was made public that concluded the study violated Nigerian law, the Declaration of Helsinki, and the United Nations' Convention on the Rights of the Child. The Nigerian government then filed both criminal and civil lawsuits against Pfizer in Nigeria. A settlement in this case has reportedly been reached, but the details of the agreement have not yet been made public. The Nigerian families have also gone to the U.S. Court of Appeals for the Second Circuit, winning the right to have the case tried in a US court. The central allegation is that “Pfizer, working in partnership with the Nigerian government, failed to secure the informed consent of either the children or their guardians and specifically failed to disclose or explain the experimental nature of the study or the serious risks involved” or to inform them that alternative treatment proven to be effective was immediately available from Médecins sans Frontières at the same facility.
