= Informed consent =

Ethical principle

Example of informed consent document from the PARAMOUNT trial

Informed consent is an applied ethics principle that a person must have sufficient information and understanding before making decisions about accepting risk. Pertinent information may include risks and benefits of treatments, alternative treatments, the patient's role in treatment, and their right to refuse treatment. In most systems, healthcare providers have a legal and ethical responsibility to ensure that a patient's consent is informed. This principle applies more broadly than healthcare intervention, for example to conduct research, to disclose a person's medical information, or to participate in high risk sporting and recreational activities.

Within the United States, definitions of informed consent vary, and the standard required is generally determined by the state. As of 2016, nearly half of the states adopted a reasonable patient standard, in which the informed consent process is viewed from the patient's perspective. These standards in medical contexts are formalized in the requirement for decision-making capacity and professional determinations in these contexts have legal authority. This requirement can be summarized in brief to presently include the following conditions, all of which must be met in order for one to qualify as possessing decision-making capacity:

1. Choice, the ability to provide or evidence a decision.
2. Understanding, the capacity to apprehend the relevant facts pertaining to the decision at issue.
3. Appreciation, the ability of the patient to give informed consent with concern for, and belief in, the impact the relevant facts will have upon oneself.
4. Reasoning, the mental acuity to make the relevant inferences from, and mental manipulations of, the information appreciated and understood to apply to the decision at hand.

Impairments to reasoning and judgment that may preclude informed consent include intellectual or emotional immaturity, high levels of stress such as post-traumatic stress disorder or a severe intellectual disability, severe mental disorder, intoxication, severe sleep deprivation, dementia, or coma.

Obtaining informed consent is not always required. If an individual is considered unable to give informed consent, another person is generally authorized to give consent on the individual's behalf—for example, the parents or legal guardians of a child (though in this circumstance the child may be required to provide informed assent) and conservators for the mentally disordered. Alternatively, the doctrine of implied consent permits treatment in limited cases, for example when an unconscious person will die without immediate intervention. Cases in which an individual is provided insufficient information to form a reasoned decision raise serious ethical issues. When these issues occur, or are anticipated to occur, in a clinical trial, they are subject to review by an ethics committee or institutional review board.

Informed consent is codified in both national and international law. 'Free consent' is a cognate term in the International Covenant on Civil and Political Rights, adopted in 1966 by the United Nations, and intended to be in force by 23 March 1976. Article 7 of the covenant prohibits experiments conducted without the "free consent to medical or scientific experimentation" of the subject. As of September 2019, the covenant has 173 parties and six more signatories without ratification.

== Assessment ==
Informed consent can be complex to evaluate, because neither expressions of consent, nor expressions of understanding of implications, necessarily mean that full adult consent was in fact given, nor that full comprehension of relevant issues is internally digested. Consent may be implied within the usual subtleties of human communication, rather than explicitly negotiated verbally or in writing. For example, if a doctor asks a patient to take their blood pressure, a patient may demonstrate consent by offering their arm for a blood pressure cuff. In some cases consent cannot legally be possible, even if the person protests he does indeed understand and wish. There are also structured instruments for evaluating capacity to give informed consent, although no ideal instrument presently exists.

Thus, there is always a degree to which informed consent must be assumed or inferred based upon observation, or knowledge, or legal reliance. This especially is the case in sexual or relational issues. In medical or formal circumstances, explicit agreement by means of signature—normally relied on legally—regardless of actual consent, is the norm. This is the case with certain procedures, such as a "do not resuscitate" directive that a patient signed before onset of their illness.

Brief examples of each of the above:

1. A person may verbally agree to something from fear, perceived social pressure, or psychological difficulty in asserting true feelings. The person requesting the action may honestly be unaware of this and believe the consent is genuine, and rely on it. Consent is expressed, but not internally given.
2. A person may claim to understand the implications of some action, as part of consent, but in fact has failed to appreciate the possible consequences fully and may later deny the validity of the consent for this reason. Understanding needed for informed consent is present but is, in fact (through ignorance), not present.
3. A person signs a legal release form for a medical procedure, and later feels he did not really consent. Unless he can show actual misinformation, the release is usually persuasive or conclusive in law, in that the clinician may rely legally upon it for consent. In formal circumstances, a written consent usually legally overrides later denial of informed consent (unless obtained by misrepresentation).
4. Informed consent in the U.S. can be overridden in emergency medical situations pursuant to 21CFR50.24, which was first brought to the general public's attention via the controversy surrounding the study of Polyheme.

== Valid elements ==
For an individual to give valid informed consent, three components must be present: disclosure, capacity and voluntariness.

- Disclosure requires the researcher to supply each prospective subject with the information necessary to make an autonomous decision and also to ensure that the subject adequately understands the information provided. This latter requirement implies that a written consent form be written in lay language suited for the comprehension skills of subject population, as well as assessing the level of understanding through conversation (to be informed).
- Capacity pertains to the ability of the subject to both understand the information provided and form a reasonable judgment based on the potential consequences of his/her decision.
- Voluntariness refers to the subject's right to freely exercise his/her decision making without being subjected to external pressure such as coercion, manipulation, or undue influence.

== Patient understanding ==
An often-overlooked aspect of valid informed consent is the patient's understanding of terminology and outcomes. The physician must explain the procedure, benefits, risks, and alternatives in words the patient can understand, as well as ensure that the patient does understand the information being relayed. The process of explanation is meant to ensure the patient has considered the options carefully and grasps the possible risks associated without feeling pressured or rushed to agree to the procedure. Exceptions to the typical consent process are only made during severe emergencies.

== From children ==
As children often lack the decision-making ability or legal power (competence) to provide true informed consent for medical decisions, it often falls on parents or legal guardians to provide informed permission for medical decisions. This "consent by proxy" usually works reasonably well, but can lead to ethical dilemmas when the judgment of the parents or guardians and the medical professional differ with regard to what constitutes appropriate decisions "in the best interest of the child". Children who are legally emancipated, and certain situations such as decisions regarding sexually transmitted diseases or pregnancy, or for unemancipated minors who are deemed to have medical decision making capacity, may be able to provide consent without the need for parental permission depending on the laws of the jurisdiction the child lives in. The American Academy of Pediatrics encourages medical professionals also to seek the assent of older children and adolescents by providing age appropriate information to these children to help empower them in the decision-making process.

Research on children has benefited society in many ways. The only effective way to establish normal patterns of growth and metabolism is to do research on infants and young children. When addressing the issue of informed consent with children, the primary response is parental consent. This is valid, although only legal guardians are able to consent for a child, not adult siblings. Additionally, parents may not order the termination of a treatment that is required to keep a child alive, even if they feel it is in the best interest. Guardians are typically involved in the consent of children, however a number of doctrines have developed that allow children to receive health treatments without parental consent. For example, emancipated minors may consent to medical treatment, and minors can also consent in an emergency. Information provided to parents/guardians, and to children themselves, as part of clinical research is often written in ways that make them difficult to understand.

== Waiver of requirement ==
Waiver of the consent requirement may be applied in certain circumstances where no foreseeable harm is expected to result from the study or when permitted by law, federal regulations, or if an ethical review committee has approved the non-disclosure of certain information.

Besides studies with minimal risk, waivers of consent may be obtained in a military setting. According to 10 USC 980, the United States Code for the Armed Forces, Limitations on the Use of Humans as Experimental Subjects, a waiver of advanced informed consent may be granted by the Secretary of Defense if a research project would:

1. Directly benefit subjects
2. Advance the development of a medical product necessary to the military
3. Be carried out under all laws and regulations (i.e., Emergency Research Consent Waiver) including those pertinent to the FDA

While informed consent is a basic right and should be carried out effectively, if a patient is incapacitated due to injury or illness, it is still important that patients benefit from emergency experimentation. The Food and Drug Administration (FDA) and the Department of Health and Human Services (DHHS) joined in 1996 to create federal guidelines to permit emergency research, without informed consent. However, they can only proceed with the research if they obtain a waiver of informed consent (WIC) or an emergency exception from informed consent (EFIC).

=== 21st Century Cures Act ===
The 21st Century Cures Act enacted by the 114th United States Congress in December 2016 allows researchers to waive the requirement for informed consent when clinical testing "poses no more than minimal risk" and "includes appropriate safeguards to protect the rights, safety, and welfare of the human subject."

== Medical sociology ==
Medical sociologists have studied informed consent as well as bioethics more generally. Oonagh Corrigan, looking at informed consent for research in patients, argues that much of the conceptualization of informed consent comes from research ethics and bioethics with a focus on patient autonomy, and notes that this aligns with a neoliberal worldview. Corrigan argues that a model based solely around individual decision making does not accurately describe the reality of consent because of social processes: a view that has started to be acknowledged in bioethics. She feels that the liberal principles of informed consent are often in opposition with autocratic medical practices such that norms values and systems of expertise often shape an individuals ability to apply choice.

Patients who agree to participate in trials often do so because they feel that the trial was suggested by a doctor as the best intervention. Patients may find being asked to consent within a limited time frame a burdensome intrusion on their care when it arises because a patient has to deal with a new condition. Patients involved in trials may not be fully aware of the alternative treatments, and an awareness that there is uncertainty in the best treatment can help make patients more aware of this. Corrigan notes that patients generally expect that doctors are acting exclusively in their interest in interactions and that this combined with "clinical equipose" where a healthcare practitioner does not know which treatment is better in a randomized control trial can be harmful to the doctor-patient relationship.

== Medical procedures ==
The doctrine of informed consent relates to professional negligence and establishes a breach of the duty of care owed to the patient (see duty of care, breach of the duty, and respect for persons). The doctrine of informed consent also has significant implications for medical trials of medications, devices, or procedures.

=== Requirements of the professional ===
Until 2015 in the United Kingdom and in countries such as Malaysia and Singapore, informed consent in medical procedures requires proof as to the standard of care to expect as a recognised standard of acceptable professional practice (the Bolam Test), that is, what risks would a medical professional usually disclose in the circumstances. Arguably, this is "sufficient consent" rather than "informed consent." The UK has since departed from the Bolam test for judging standards of informed consent, due to the landmark ruling in Montgomery v Lanarkshire Health Board. This moves away from the concept of a reasonable physician and instead uses the standard of a reasonable patient, and what risks an individual would attach significance to.

Medicine in the United States, Australia, and Canada takes this patient-centric approach to "informed consent." Informed consent in these jurisdictions requires healthcare providers to disclose significant risks, as well as risks of particular importance to that patient. This approach combines an objective (a hypothetical reasonable patient) and subjective (this particular patient) approach.

Optimal establishment of an informed consent requires adaptation to cultural or other individual factors of the patient. As of 2011, for example, people from Mediterranean and Arab backgrounds appeared to rely more on the context of the delivery of the information, with the information being carried more by who is saying it and where, when, and how it is being said, rather than what is said, which is of relatively more importance in typical "Western" countries.

The informed consent doctrine is generally implemented through good healthcare practice: pre-operation discussions with patients and the use of medical consent forms in hospitals. However, reliance on a signed form should not undermine the basis of the doctrine in giving the patient an opportunity to weigh and respond to the risk. In one British case, a doctor performing routine surgery on a woman noticed that she had cancerous tissue in her womb. He took the initiative to remove the woman's womb; however, as she had not given informed consent for this operation, the doctor was judged by the General Medical Council to have acted negligently. The council stated that the woman should have been informed of her condition, and allowed to make her own decision.

=== Obtaining informed consents ===
To document that informed consent has been given for a procedure, healthcare organisations have traditionally used paper-based consent forms on which the procedure and its risks and benefits are noted, and is signed by both patient and clinician. In a number of healthcare organisations consent forms are scanned and maintained in an electronic document store. The paper consent process has been demonstrated to be associated with significant errors of omission, and therefore increasing numbers of organisations are using digital consent applications where the risk of errors can be minimised, a patient's decision making and comprehension can be supported by additional lay-friendly and accessible information, consent can be completed remotely, and the process can become paperless. One form of digital consent is dynamic consent, which invites participants to provide consent in a granular way, and makes it easier for them to withdraw consent if they wish.

Patient satisfaction in the context of novel forms of informed consent has been a topic in scientific research. Visual and auditory components in video-assisted informed consent and digital informed consent have proved to lead to higher patient satisfaction. Integrating patients into treatment decisions (shared decision-making) and increasing transparency leads to better overall treatment adherence.

Electronic consent methods have been used to support indexing and retrieval of consent data, thus enhancing the ability to honor to patient intent and identify willing research participants. More recently, Health Sciences South Carolina, a statewide research collaborative focused on transforming healthcare quality, health information systems and patient outcomes, developed an open-source system called Research Permissions Management System (RPMS).

=== Competency of the patient ===
The ability to give informed consent is governed by a general requirement of competency. In common law jurisdictions, adults are presumed competent to consent. This presumption can be rebutted, for instance, in circumstances of mental illness or other incompetence. This may be prescribed in legislation or based on a common-law standard of inability to understand the nature of the procedure. In cases of incompetent adults, a health care proxy makes medical decisions. In the absence of a proxy, the medical practitioner is expected to act in the patient's best interests until a proxy can be found.

By contrast, 'minors' (which may be defined differently in different jurisdictions) are generally presumed incompetent to consent, but depending on their age and other factors may be required to provide Informed assent. In some jurisdictions (e.g. much of the U.S.), this is a strict standard. In other jurisdictions (e.g. England, Australia, Canada), this presumption may be rebutted through proof that the minor is 'mature' (the 'Gillick standard'). In cases of incompetent minors, informed consent is usually required from the parent (rather than the 'best interests standard') although a parens patriae order may apply, allowing the court to dispense with parental consent in cases of refusal.

=== Deception ===
Research involving deception is controversial given the requirement for informed consent. Deception typically arises in social psychology, when researching a particular psychological process requires that investigators deceive subjects. For example, in the Milgram experiment, researchers wanted to determine the willingness of participants to obey authority figures despite their personal conscientious objections. They had authority figures demand that participants deliver what they thought was an electric shock to another research participant. For the study to succeed, it was necessary to deceive the participants so they believed that the subject was a peer and that their electric shocks caused the peer actual pain.

Nonetheless, research involving deception prevents subjects from exercising their basic right of autonomous informed decision-making and conflicts with the ethical principle of respect for persons.

The Ethical Principles of Psychologists and Code of Conduct set by the American Psychological Association says that psychologists may conduct research that includes a deceptive compartment only if they can both justify the act by the value and importance of the study's results and show they could not obtain the results by some other way. Moreover, the research should bear no potential harm to the subject as an outcome of deception, either physical pain or emotional distress. Finally, the code requires a debriefing session in which the experimenter both tells the subject about the deception and gives subject the option of withdrawing the data.

=== Abortion ===
In some U.S. states, informed consent laws (sometimes called "right to know" laws) require that a woman seeking an elective abortion receive information from the abortion provider about her legal rights, alternatives to abortion (such as adoption), available public and private assistance, and other information specified in the law, before the abortion is performed. Other countries with such laws (e.g. Germany) require that the information giver be properly certified to make sure that no abortion is carried out for the financial gain of the abortion provider and to ensure that the decision to have an abortion is not swayed by any form of incentive.

Some informed consent laws have been criticized for allegedly using "loaded language in an apparently deliberate attempt to 'personify' the fetus," but those critics acknowledge that "most of the information in the [legally mandated] materials about abortion comports with recent scientific findings and the principles of informed consent", although "some content is either misleading or altogether incorrect."

== Within research ==
=== Medicine ===
Informed consent is part of ethical clinical research as well, in which a human subject voluntarily confirms his or her willingness to participate in a particular clinical trial, after having been informed of all aspects of the trial that are relevant to the subject's decision to participate. This includes information about potential harms as well as potential benefits of clinical trial treatments. Informed consent is documented by means of a written, signed, and dated informed consent form.

In medical research, the Nuremberg Code set a base international standard in 1947, in response to the ethical violation in the Holocaust. Standards continued to develop. Nowadays, medical research is overseen by an ethics committee that also oversees the informed consent process.

Research involving persons with disorders of consciousness presents additional consent challenges because potential participants often have absent, limited, or fluctuating decision-making capacity, requiring reliance on surrogate decision-makers. In 2026, the Curing Coma Campaign Ethics Workgroup proposed the Common Consent Elements for Research Involving Persons with Disorders of Consciousness (CCE-DOC), a framework intended to clarify and standardize consent processes for such research, including explanation of the disorder of consciousness, capacity assessment, risks and benefits, surrogate decision-making, and sharing of investigational results.

=== Social sciences ===
As the medical guidelines established in the Nuremberg Code were imported into the ethical guidelines for the social sciences, informed consent became a common part of the research procedure. However, while informed consent is the default in medical settings, it is not always required in the social sciences. Here, firstly, research often involves low or no risk for participants, unlike in many medical experiments. Secondly, the mere knowledge that they participate in a study can cause people to alter their behavior, as in the Hawthorne Effect: "In the typical lab experiment, subjects enter an environment in which they are keenly aware that their behavior is being monitored, recorded, and subsequently scrutinized." In such cases, seeking informed consent directly interferes with the ability to conduct the research, because the very act of revealing that a study is being conducted is likely to alter the behavior studied. Author J.A. List explains the potential dilemma that can result: "if one were interested in exploring whether, and to what extent, race or gender influences the prices that buyers pay for used cars, it would be difficult to measure accurately the degree of discrimination among used car dealers who know that they are taking part in an experiment." In a case where such interference is likely, and after careful consideration, a researcher may forgo the informed consent process. This may be done after the researcher(s) and an Ethics Committee and/or Institutional Review Board (IRB) weigh the risk to study participants against the benefits to society and whether participants participate voluntarily and are to be treated fairly.

The birth of new online media, such as social media, has complicated the idea of informed consent. In an online environment people pay little attention to Terms of Use agreements and can subject themselves to research without thorough knowledge. This issue came to the public light following a study conducted by Facebook in 2014, and published by that company and Cornell University. Facebook conducted a study without consulting an Ethics Committee or IRB where they altered the Facebook News Feeds of roughly 700,000 users to reduce either the amount of positive or negative posts they saw for a week. The study then analyzed if the users' status updates changed during the different conditions. The study was published in the Proceedings of the National Academy of Sciences. The lack of informed consent led to outrage among many researchers and users. Many believed that by potentially altering the mood of users by altering what posts they see, Facebook put at-risk individuals at higher dangers for depression and suicide. However, supporters of Facebook claim that Facebook details that they have the right to use information for research in their terms of use. Others say the experiment is just a part of Facebook's current work, which alters News Feeds algorithms continually to keep people interested and coming back to the site. Others pointed out that this specific study is not unique but rather news organizations constantly try out different headlines using algorithms to elicit emotions and garner clicks or Facebook shares. They say this Facebook study is no different from things people already accept. Still, others say that Facebook broke the law when conducting the experiment on users that did not give informed consent. The Facebook study controversy raises numerous questions about informed consent and the differences in the ethical review process between publicly and privately funded research. Some say Facebook was within its limits and others see the need for more informed consent and/or the establishment of in-house private review boards.

=== Duty to share findings ===
Some researchers and ethicists advocate for researchers to share experimental results with their subjects in a way they can understand, both as an ethical obligation and as a way to encourage more participation. In 2023, the government of the United Kingdom proposed making this a requirement. The Ethical, Legal, and Social Implications research program of the National Human Genome Research Institute in the United States has provided some funding for researchers to do this.

== Conflicts of interest ==
Other, long-standing controversies underscore the role for conflicts of interest among medical school faculty and researchers. For example, in 2014 coverage of University of California (UC) medical school faculty members has included news of ongoing corporate payments to researchers and practitioners from companies that market and produce the very devices and treatments they recommend to patients. Robert Pedowitz, the former chairman of UCLA's orthopedic surgery department, reported concern that his colleague's financial conflicts of interest could negatively affect patient care or research into new treatments. In a subsequent lawsuit about whistleblower retaliation, the university provided a $10 million settlement to Pedowitz while acknowledging no wrongdoing. Consumer Watchdog, an oversight group, observed that University of California policies were "either inadequate or unenforced...Patients in UC hospitals deserve the most reliable surgical devices and medication…and they shouldn't be treated as subjects in expensive experiments." Other UC incidents include taking the eggs of women for implantation into other women without consent and injecting live bacteria into human brains, resulting in potentially premature deaths.

== History ==
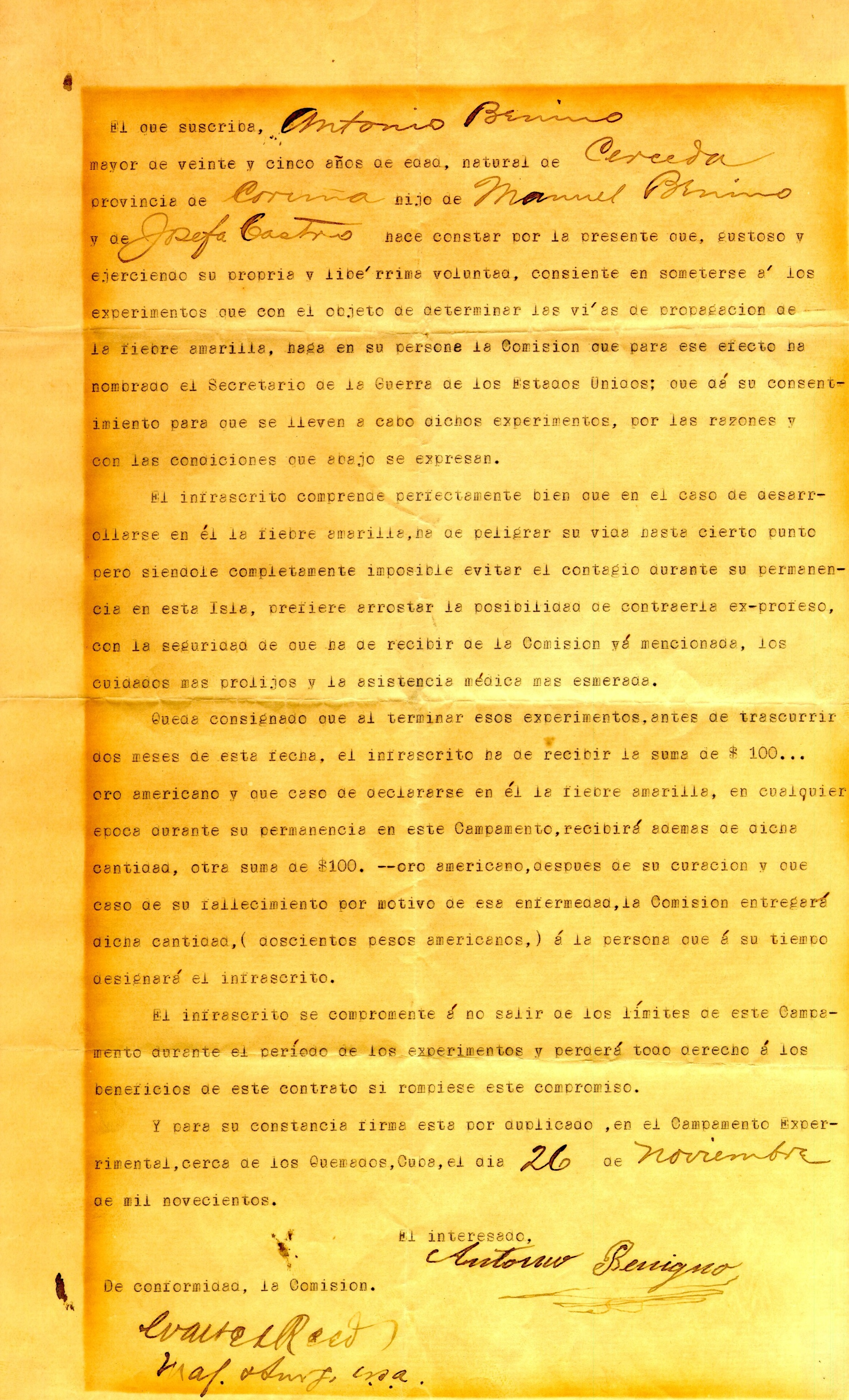
Spanish

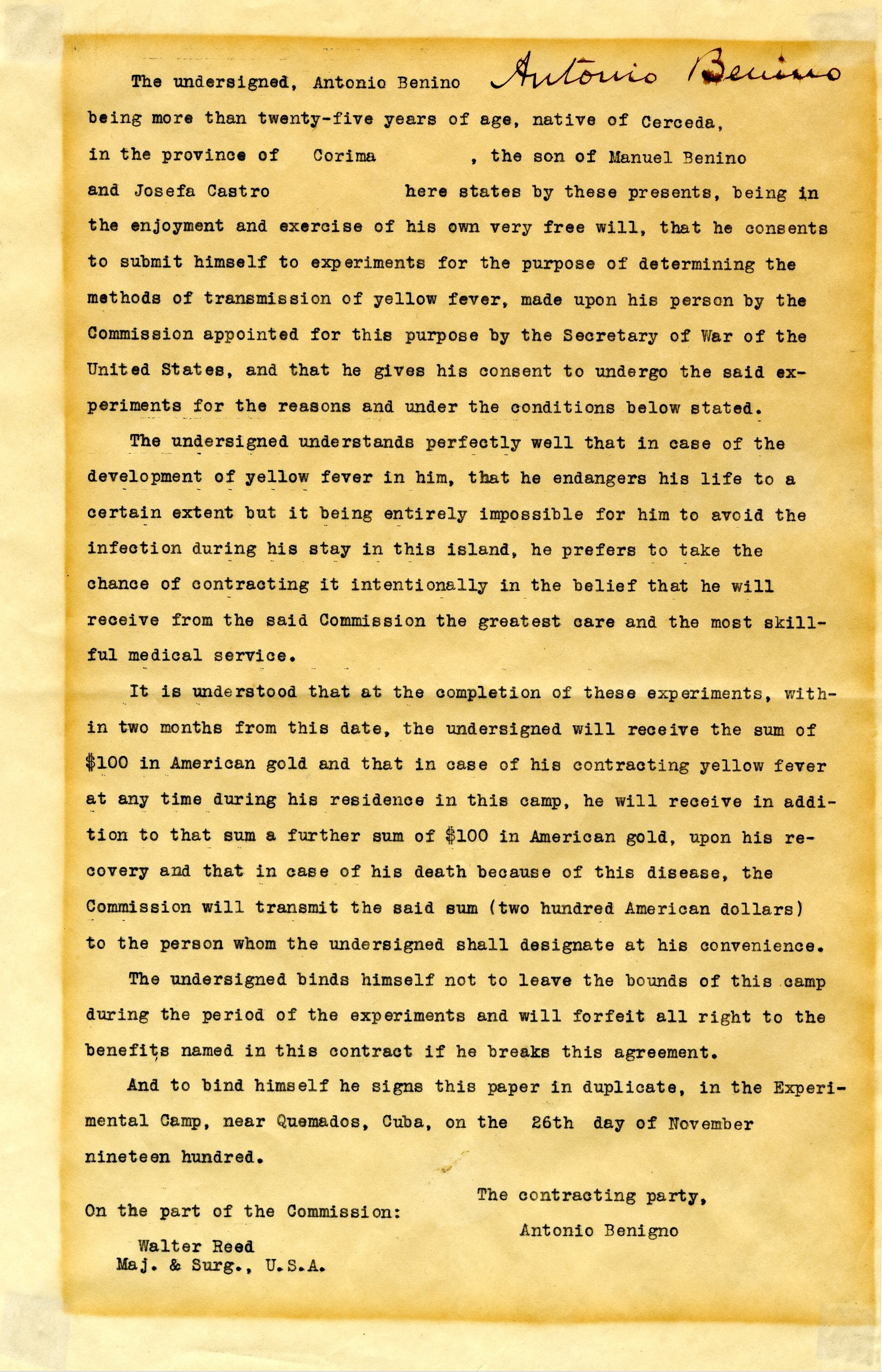
English

Walter Reed authored these informed consent documents in 1900 for his research on yellow fever.

Informed consent is a technical term first used by attorney, Paul G. Gebhard, in the Salgo v. Leland Stanford Jr. University Board of Trustees court case in 1957. In tracing its history, some scholars have suggested tracing the history of checking for any of these practices:

1. A patient agrees to a health intervention based on an understanding of it.
2. The patient has multiple choices and is not compelled to choose a particular one.
3. The consent includes giving permission.

These practices are part of what constitutes informed consent, and their history is the history of informed consent. They combine to form the modern concept of informed consent—which rose in response to particular incidents in modern research. Whereas various cultures in various places practiced informed consent, the modern concept of informed consent was developed by people who drew influence from Western tradition.

=== Medical history ===
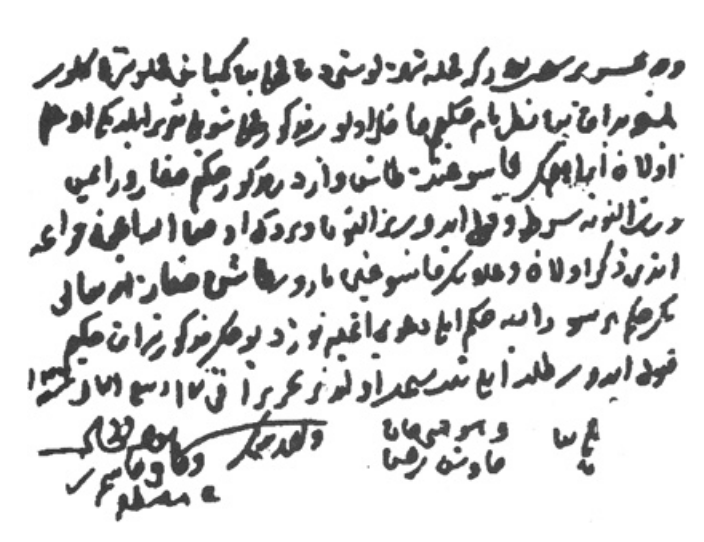
In this Ottoman Empire document from 1539 a father promises to not sue a surgeon in case of death following the removal of his son's urinary stones.

Historians cite a series of medical guidelines to trace the history of informed consent in medical practice.

The Hippocratic Oath, a Greek text dating to 500 B.C.E., was the first set of Western writings giving guidelines for the conduct of medical professionals. Consent by patients as well as several other, now considered fundamental issues, is not mentioned. The Hippocratic Corpus advises that physicians conceal most information from patients to give the patients the best care. The rationale is a beneficence model for care—the doctor knows better than the patient, and therefore should direct the patient's care, because the patient is not likely to have better ideas than the doctor.

Henri de Mondeville, a French surgeon who in the 14th century, wrote about medical practice. He traced his ideas to the Hippocratic Oath. Among his recommendations were that doctors "promise a cure to every patient" in hopes that the good prognosis would inspire a good outcome to treatment. Mondeville never mentioned getting consent, but did emphasize the need for the patient to have confidence in the doctor. He also advised that when deciding therapeutically unimportant details the doctor should meet the patients' requests "so far as they do not interfere with treatment".

In Ottoman Empire records there exists an agreement from 1539 in which negotiates details of a surgery, including fee and a commitment not to sue in case of death. This is the oldest identified written document in which a patient acknowledges risk of medical treatment and writes to express their willingness to proceed.

Benjamin Rush was an 18th-century United States physician who was influenced by the Age of Enlightenment cultural movement. Because of this, he advised that doctors ought to share as much information as possible with patients. He recommended that doctors educate the public and respect a patient's informed decision to accept therapy. There is no evidence that he supported seeking a consent from patients. In a lecture titled "On the duties of patients to their physicians", he stated that patients should be strictly obedient to the physician's orders; this was representative of much of his writings. John Gregory, Rush's teacher, wrote similar views that a doctor could best practice beneficence by making decisions for the patients without their consent.

Thomas Percival was a British physician who published a book called Medical Ethics in 1803. Percival was a student of the works of Gregory and various earlier Hippocratic physicians. Like all previous works, Percival's Medical Ethics makes no mention of soliciting for the consent of patients or respecting their decisions. Percival said that patients have a right to truth, but when the physician could provide better treatment by lying or withholding information, he advised that the physician do as he thought best.

When the American Medical Association was founded they in 1847 produced a work called the first edition of the American Medical Association Code of Medical Ethics. Many sections of this book are verbatim copies of passages from Percival's Medical Ethics. A new concept in this book was the idea that physicians should fully disclose all patient details truthfully when talking to other physicians, but the text does not also apply this idea to disclosing information to patients. Through this text, Percival's ideas became pervasive guidelines throughout the United States as other texts were derived from them.

Worthington Hooker was an American physician who in 1849 published Physician and Patient. This medical ethics book was radical demonstrating understanding of the AMA's guidelines and Percival's philosophy and soundly rejecting all directives that a doctor should lie to patients. In Hooker's view, benevolent deception is not fair to the patient, and he lectured widely on this topic. Hooker's ideas were not broadly influential.

The principle of informed consent was not legally binding until first recorded in the Salgo v. Leland Stanford Jr University Board of Trustees case of 1957. Salgo underwent a procedure to evaluate his aortic arteriosclerosis; a contrast (which is a substance used in medical imaging to differentiate internal structures) was injected into his aorta to find blockages, but his legs ended up permanently paralyzed; however, Salgo had not been informed of this risk. This case was one of the first to draw attention to the need for patients to understand the risks and benefits of their procedures, since at that time a lack of informed consent was not considered negligence.

The US Canterbury v. Spence case in 1972 officially established the principle of informed consent in US law. Canterbury underwent a laminectomy to relieve back pain but was not informed of the risk of paralysis. While left by himself, he fell off his bed and was later paralyzed from the waist down; he required further surgeries but was never completely relieved of paralysis in his bowels and bladder. Earlier legal cases had created the underpinnings for informed consent, but his judgment gave a detailed and thought through discourse on the matter. The judgment cites cases going back to 1914 as precedent for informed consent.

=== Research history ===
Historians cite a series of human subject research experiments to trace the history of informed consent in research.

The U.S. Army Yellow Fever Commission "is considered the first research group in history to use consent forms." In 1900, Major Walter Reed was appointed head of the four man U.S. Army Yellow Fever Commission in Cuba that determined mosquitoes were the vector for yellow fever transmission. His earliest experiments were probably done without formal documentation of informed consent. In later experiments he obtained support from appropriate military and administrative authorities. He then drafted what is now "one of the oldest series of extant informed consent documents." The three surviving examples are in Spanish with English translations; two have an individual's signature and one is marked with an X.

Tearoom Trade is the name of a book by American psychologist Laud Humphreys. In it he describes his research into male homosexual acts. In conducting this research he never sought consent from his research subjects and other researchers raised concerns that he violated the right to privacy for research participants.

On January 29, 1951, shortly after the birth of her son Joseph, Henrietta Lacks entered Johns Hopkins Hospital in Baltimore with profuse bleeding. She was diagnosed with aggressive cervical cancer and was treated with inserts of radium tubes. During her radiation treatments for the tumor, two samples—one of healthy cells, the other of malignant cells—were removed from her cervix without her knowledge or permission. There is no evidence that the doctor checked the cells for other conditions before passing them on for research. Later that year, 31-year-old Henrietta Lacks died from the cancer. Her cells were capable of surviving and dividing indefinitely when cultured, creating HeLa cells, but the family, which was living in poverty, was not informed until 1973; the family learned the truth when scientists asked for DNA samples after finding that HeLa had contaminated other samples. In 2013, researchers published the genome without the Lacks family's consent. As a result of this incident, pushes were made for major changes in the US's process for informed consent in biospecimen research.

The Milgram experiment is the name of a 1961 experiment conducted by American psychologist Stanley Milgram. In the experiment Milgram had an authority figure order research participants to commit a disturbing act of harming another person. After the experiment he would reveal that he had deceived the participants and that they had not hurt anyone, but the research participants were upset at the experience of having participated in the research. The experiment raised broad discussion on the ethics of recruiting participants for research without giving them full information about the nature of the research.

Chester M. Southam used HeLa cells to inject into cancer patients and Ohio State Penitentiary inmates without informed consent to determine if people could become immune to cancer and if cancer could be transmitted.

== New areas ==
With the growth of bioethics in the 21st century to include environmental sustainability, some authors, such as Cristina Richie have proposed a "green consent". This would include information and education about the climate impact of pharmaceuticals (carbon cost of medications) and climate change health hazards.

Artificial intelligence (AI) became widespread in the 21st century. It raises many ethical concerns in the medical field, such as the patients’ awareness that they may be interacting with an AI system, as it is being gradually integrated into scanning, surgery, and diagnoses. A number of companies, inspired by the ChatGPT3 system that was released in December 2022, developed AI therapists, which are mental health chatbots that can provide treatment information and perform mental health therapy. Patients must be educated about AI usage to promote trust in the systems.

== See also ==
- Anti-psychiatry
- Belmont Report
- Consent (BDSM)
- Consent (criminal law)
- Consensual crime
- Declaration of Geneva
- Declaration of Helsinki
- Deliberative democracy
- Dynamic consent
- Free, prior and informed consent
- Futile medical care
- Human experimentation
- Informed assent
- Informed refusal
- International Conference on Harmonisation of Technical Requirements for Registration of Pharmaceuticals for Human Use
- Involuntary treatment
- Minors and abortion
- Parental consent
- Patient safety
- Safe, sane and consensual
- World Medical Association
- Therapeutic misconception
