= Aortography =

Medical procedure

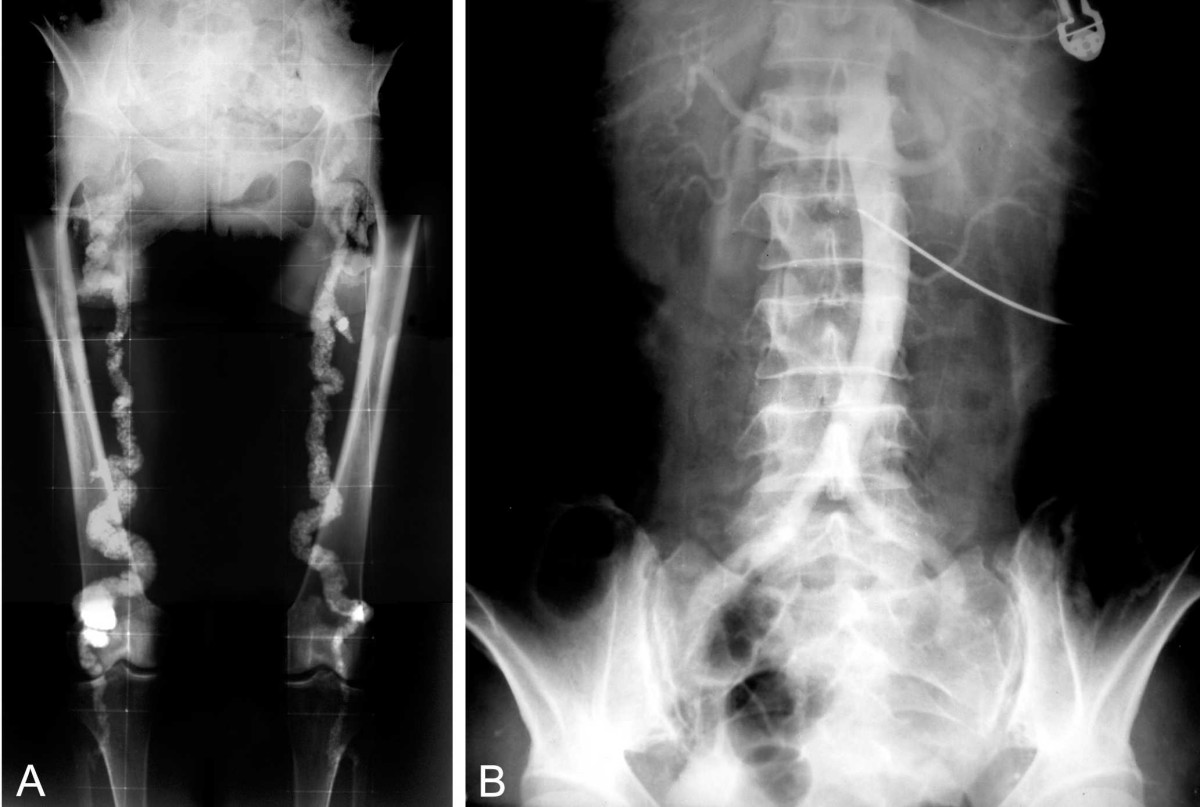
- B. Translumbar aortography shows near-total obstruction of the femoral arteries in a patient with Monckeberg's arteriosclerosis.
- ICD-9-CM: 88.42
- MeSH: D001027

Aortography involves placement of a catheter in the aorta and injection of contrast material while taking X-rays of the aorta. The procedure is known as an aortogram. The diagnosis of aortic dissection can be made by visualization of the intimal flap and flow of contrast material in both the true lumen and the false lumen. The catheter has to be inserted through the right femoral artery, because in about two-thirds of cases the aortic dissection spreads into the left common iliac artery.

The aortogram was previously considered the gold standard test for the diagnosis of aortic dissection, with a sensitivity of up to 80% and a specificity of about 94%. It is especially poor in the diagnosis of cases where the dissection is due to hemorrhage within the media without any initiating intimal tear.

The advantage of the aortogram in the diagnosis of aortic dissection is that it can delineate the extent of involvement of the aorta and branch vessels and can diagnose aortic insufficiency. The disadvantages of the aortogram are that it is an invasive procedure and it requires the use of iodinated contrast material.

Aortography has largely been replaced by the diagnostic tools of MRI, CT, and transesophageal echocardiography (TEE) all of which have high sensitivities. TEE is favored in emergency situations, as it is relatively non-invasive and a rapid procedure (more so than MRI, which can take hours).
