= Schloendorff v. Society of New York Hospital =

1914 New York Court of Appeals case

- Court: New York Court of Appeals
- Full case name: Mary E. Schloendorff v. The Society of the New York Hospital
- Decided: April 14, 1914
- Citation: 105 N.E. 92, 211 N.Y. 125

Case history
- Prior history: Schloendorff v. Society of New York Hospital, 133 N.Y.S. 1143 (App. Div. 1912) (memorandum opinion)

Court membership
- Chief judge: Willard Bartlett
- Associate judges: Cardozo, Chase, Cuddeback, Hiscock, Miller

Case opinions
- Majority: Cardozo, joined by Hiscock, Chase, Collin, Cuddeback
- Bartlett and Miller took no part in the consideration or decision of the case.

Schloendorff v. Society of New York Hospital, 105 N.E. 92 (N.Y. 1914), was a decision issued by the New York Court of Appeals in 1914 which established principles of respondeat superior in United States law.

== Facts ==
In January 1908, Mary Schloendorff, also known as Mary Gamble—an elocutionist from San Francisco—was admitted to New York Hospital to evaluate and treat a stomach disorder. Some weeks into her stay at the hospital, the house physician diagnosed a fibroid tumor. The visiting physician recommended surgery, which Schloendorff adamantly declined. She consented to an examination under ether anesthesia. During the procedure, the doctors performed surgery to remove the tumor. Afterwards, Schloendorff developed gangrene in the left arm, ultimately leading to the amputation of some fingers. Schloendorff blamed the surgery, and filed suit.

== Judgment ==
The Court found that the operation to which the plaintiff did not consent constituted medical battery. Justice Benjamin Cardozo wrote in the Court's opinion:

Every human being of adult years and sound mind has a right to determine what shall be done with his own body; and a surgeon who performs an operation without his patient's consent commits an assault for which he is liable in damages. This is true except in cases of emergency where the patient is unconscious and where it is necessary to operate before consent can be obtained.

Schloendorff, however, had sued the hospital itself, not the physicians. For this reason, the Court found that a non-profit hospital could not be held liable for the actions of its employees, analogizing to the principle of charitable immunity.

== Significance ==
The idea that a non-profit hospital could not be sued for actions of its employees became a principle that became known as the "Schloendorff rule." The Court would later reject the "Schloendorff rule" in the 1957 decision of Bing v. Thunig.

== See also ==
- US tort law
