= Rule of sevens =

Legal doctrine about the age of criminal responsibility

The rule of sevens, in English common law, establishes three age brackets for determining a young person's capacity to be responsible for torts and crimes. Children under the age of seven cannot be held to have capacity, while there is a rebuttable presumption that a minor aged 7 to 14 lacks capacity; for those aged 14 to 21, there is a rebuttable presumption of capacity. The rule of sevens is also used in determining capacity to give informed assent to participate in clinical trials.

== Examples ==
Tennessee applies this rule by rebuttably presuming that any minor aged 7–13 is not mature enough to consent to medical procedures, while minors aged 14 and older are.

North Carolina applies this rule to the civil liability of children in automobile accidents. Under that state's law, if someone is found to be acting negligently, any injury from a resulting accident cannot be compensated for. When applied to children and automobile accidents, any child under the age of seven cannot be negligent regardless of their actions; it is presumed that children between the ages of seven and thirteen are not negligent unless their actions are deemed to be unreasonable for someone of that age; and anyone between the ages of fourteen and seventeen is held to the same standard as adults unless evidence is entered that contradicts that presumption.
