= Argetsinger =

Argetsinger is a surname. Notable people with the surname include:

- Amy Argetsinger (fl. 1986), American newspaper editor
- Cameron Argetsinger (1921–2008), American lawyer and auto racing executive
- George F. Argetsinger (1874–1951), American politician in New York
- LaFayette W. Argetsinger (1858–1937), American politician in New York
- Minnie Argetsinger (1882–1954), American Baptist missionary
- Peter Argetsinger (1950–2020), American racing driver
- Ulysses Argetsinger (1866–1942), American politician and lawyer from Minnesota
