= Henry Salant =

American politician

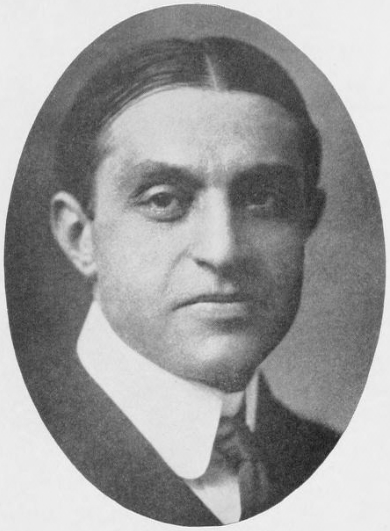

Member of the New York State Senate
- In office 1913
- Constituency: 19th district

Personal details
- Born: September 13, 1874 Courland, Russian Empire
- Died: March 17, 1952 (aged 77)
- Party: Progressive
- Spouse: Ethel Neale (m. 1919)
- Education: New York University School of Law
- Occupation: Lawyer, politician

Henry Salant (September 13, 1874 – March 17, 1952) was an American lawyer and politician from New York.

== Life ==
He was born on September 13, 1874, in Courland, Russian Empire, the son of Solomon Salant (1848–1910). The family emigrated to the United States and settled in New York City where Solomon Salant opened a shirt factory, which became later the Salant Corporation. Henry attended the public schools in New York City. He graduated Ph.B. from New York University in 1895, and LL.B. from New York University School of Law in 1898.

In November 1912, Salant ran on the Progressive ticket, with Independence League endorsement, for the New York State Senate (19th D.). He was declared elected by a plurality of 36 votes, defeating Democrat George W. Simpson and the incumbent Republican Josiah T. Newcomb. Salant took his seat in the 136th New York State Legislature at the beginning of the session in January 1913. His election was contested by Democrat George W. Simpson who asked for a recount of the approximately 50,000 ballots. On April 29, 1913, the Senate Committee on Elections concluded that Simpson had received a plurality of 77 votes, and Simpson was seated in place of Salant. The Senate voted to pay Salant the full year's legislative salary, but Gov. William Sulzer vetoed an additional appropriation of $2,000 to pay for Salant's expenses and legal fees stemming from the contested election case.

In 1914 and 1916, Salant ran again for the State Senate but was both times defeated, first by Simpson, then by Edward J. Dowling.

On August 5, 1919, he married Ethel Neale.

Salant died on March 17, 1952.

CBS News President Richard S. Salant (1914–1993) was his nephew.

New York State Senate
Preceded by Josiah T. Newcomb	New York State Senate; 19th District; 1913	Succeeded by George W. Simpson
