= Senator Dowling =

Senator Dowling may refer to:

- Edward J. Dowling (1875–?), New York State Senate
- Victor J. Dowling (1866–1934), New York State Senate
