= Senator Burlingame =

Senator Burlingame may refer to:

- Alvah W. Burlingame Jr. (1879–1952), New York State Senate
- Anson Burlingame (1820–1870), Massachusetts State Senate
