= Senator Dick (disambiguation) =

Charles W. F. Dick (1858–1945), was a U.S. Senator from Ohio from 1904 to 1911. Senator Dick may also refer to:

- Homer E. A. Dick (1884–1942), New York State Senate
- Robert P. Dick (1823–1898), North Carolina State Senate

== See also ==
- John Adams Dix (1798–1879), U.S. Senator from New York from 1845 to 1849
