= George Wellington =

George Wellington may refer to:

- George B. Wellington (1856–1921), New York state senator
- George L. Wellington (1852–1927), U.S. Senator from Maryland
