= Michael Schaap =

American businessman and politician (1874–1957)

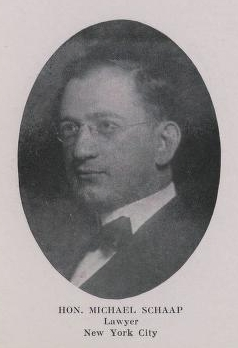
Hon. Michael Schaap

Michael Schaap (March 20, 1874 – December 23, 1957) was an American businessman and politician from New York.

== Life ==
He was born on March 20, 1874, in New York City, the son of Maurits Alexander Schaap and Esther (Digtmaker) Schaap. He attended New York Evening High School, and graduated LL.B. from New York University School of Law in 1896. He practiced law in New York City until 1917.

In November 1912, he was elected on the Progressive ticket to the New York State Assembly (New York Co., 31st D.), and was re-elected in November 1913. He was a member of the State Assembly in 1913 and 1914, sitting in the 136th and 137th New York State Legislatures. He was the Progressive leader in the Assembly during both terms. On April 27, 1914, he married Stella Hammerslough.

In 1914 and 1915, he made unsuccessful efforts to get elected to the New York City Court. In November 1916, he ran on the Democratic ticket for Congress in the 19th District but was defeated by the incumbent Progressive Walter M. Chandler who ran on the Republican ticket for re-election.

In 1917, he began to work for Bamberger's and was vice president and managing director of the company when it was acquired by Macy's in 1929. He was president of Bloomingdale's from 1929 to 1944, and chairman of the board from 1944 to 1948.

He died on December 23, 1957, after falling out of a window at his lodgings on the 12th floor of the Hotel Chatham, in Manhattan.

New York State Assembly
Preceded by Max Shlivek	New York State Assembly; New York County, 31st District; 1913–1914	Succeeded by Aaron A. Feinberg
