= James H. Wood =

American lawyer and politician

James Hewitt Wood (July 4, 1879 – May 10, 1951) was an American lawyer and politician from New York.

== Life ==
Wood was born on July 4, 1879, in Mayfield, New York, the son of glove manufacturer James E. Wood and Catherine Titcomb.

In 1901, Wood moved to Missouri to work in railroad construction. Shortly afterwards, he left for South Africa via New Orleans with 1,100 horses to be used for the Boer War. He and 50 other crew members signed up to fight in the British army while outside of Cape Town, but some slight difficulties between the ship's crew and officers that the officers labelled mutiny led the British authorities to accept the horses but not the crew. He then returned to America, where he did engineering work for the lower Mississippi River levee. There, he formed a partnership with a Colorado miner and went with him to Central America, where he alternated between constructing railroads and prospecting for gold in the mountains. After a year, he returned home.

Wood began attending Cornell University in 1903, graduating from there with an LL.B. in 1907. He then moved to Gloversville and practiced law with his brother Jeremiah. He also became a director and counsel of the Trust Company of Fulton County.

In 1912, Wood was elected to the New York State Assembly as a Republican, representing Fulton and Hamilton Counties. He served in the Assembly in 1913, 1914, and 1915. In 1928, he was appointed city attorney, a position he held until 1946.

In 1910, Wood married Majorie Dennis. He was a member and deacon of the Congregational church. He was an active member of the Independent Order of Odd Fellows for 50 years.

Wood died at Littauer Hospital on May 10, 1951. He was buried in Mayfield cemetery.

New York State Assembly
Preceded by Alden Hart	New York State Assembly; Fulton and Hamilton Counties; 1913-1915	Succeeded by Burt Z. Kasson
