= Henry C. Karpen =

American politician

Henry C. Karpen (October 10, 1868 – July 27, 1936) was an American politician from New York.

== Life ==
He was born on October 10, 1868, in Brooklyn, Kings County, New York. He studied at the Electro-Therapeutic Institute, and became a "medical electrician" and manufacturer of surgical instruments. Later he also engaged in the real estate business.

In November 1910, he ran on the Republican ticket for the New York State Assembly (Kings Co., 6th D.), and polled 3,533 votes, but was defeated by the incumbent Democrat John H. Gerken who polled 3,586 votes.

In November 1912, Karpen ran on the Progressive and Independence League tickets for the State Assembly (Kings Co., 21st D.), and polled 1,674 votes, but was defeated by the incumbent Democrat Harry Heyman who polled 2,000 votes.

In November 1913, Karpen defeated Heyman, and was elected as a Progressive, with Republican and Independence League endorsement, to the State Assembly (Kings Co., 21st D.). Karpen polled 2,663 votes, and Heyman polled 1,559. Karpen was a member of the 137th New York State Legislature in 1914. In November 1914, he ran for re-election, but was defeated by Democrat Isaac Mendelsohn.

Karpen died on July 27, 1936, at the home of his brother Clarence Alfred Karpen in Lynbrook, Nassau County, New York, of angina pectoris; and was buried at the Cypress Hills Cemetery in New York City.

New York State Assembly
Preceded by Harry Heyman	New York State Assembly; Kings County, 21st District; 1914	Succeeded by Isaac Mendelsohn
