= Henry Scheidemann =

American politician

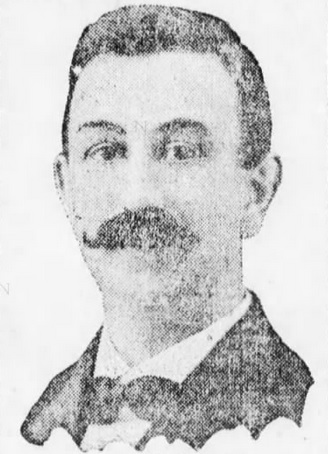
Henry Scheidemann (1914)

Henry Scheidemann (February 2, 1877 – June 1964) was an American politician from New York.

== Life ==
He was born on February 2, 1877, in Allershausen, Province of Hanover, Kingdom of Prussia. In 1896, he emigrated to the United States, and settled in Brooklyn, Kings County, New York. There he ran a grocery store.

In November 1913, he was elected on the Progressive ticket, with Republican endorsement, to the New York State Assembly (Kings Co., 19th D.), defeating the incumbent Democrat Jacob Schifferdecker. Scheidemann was a member of the 137th New York State Legislature in 1914. In November 1914, he ran on the Progressive ticket for re-election, but was defeated by Democrat William A. Bacher.

He died in June 1964.

New York State Assembly
Preceded by Jacob Schifferdecker	New York State Assembly; Kings County, 19th District; 1914	Succeeded by William A. Bacher
