= William J. McRoberts =

American politician

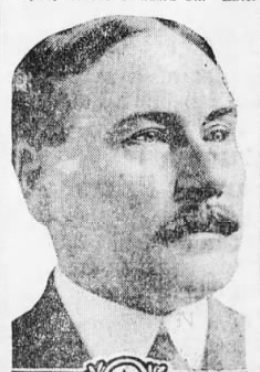
William J. McRoberts (1914)

William John McRoberts (died September 25, 1933) was an American businessman and politician from New York.

== Life ==
He was born in Downpatrick, County Down, Ireland. Aged about 16 years, he emigrated to the United States and settled in New York City. There he worked on the piers of the port. In 1876, he opened McRoberts Protective Agency, a private security firm which initially offered to the shipping companies protection against theft of the cargoes which passed through the port of New York. In 1893, he moved to Brooklyn. Later he also ran a shipping company, and a contracting business. He married Catherine Louise, and they had four children.

In November 1913, McRoberts was elected as a Progressive, with Republican endorsement, to the State Assembly (Kings Co., 9th D.). McRoberts polled 7,190 votes, defeating the incumbent Democrat Frederick S. Burr who polled 5,589 votes. McRoberts was a member of the 137th New York State Legislature in 1914. In November 1914, he ran for re-election, but was defeated by Burr.

In November 1915, McRoberts ran on the Progressive, Republican and American tickets for the State Assembly, but was again defeated by Burr, the vote stood 7,213 for Burr and 7,146 for McRoberts. McRoberts contested Burr's election, but his claim was unsuccessful.

McRoberts died on September 25, 1933, at his home in Brooklyn, of heart disease.

New York State Assembly
Preceded by Frederick S. Burr	New York State Assembly; Kings County, 9th District; 1914	Succeeded by Frederick S. Burr
