= Edward Weil =

American politician

Edward Weil (April 12, 1872 – March 4, 1932) was a Jewish-American lawyer, politician, and judge from New York.

== Life ==
Weil was born on April 12, 1872, in New York City, New York. His father was Isaac Weil, a German immigrant and garment worker.

Weil attended Grammar School No. 15 and the old Fifth Street school. He then went to the New York University School of Law, graduating from there with an LL.B. in 1893. He was admitted to the bar in 1898 and developed an extensive law practice in New York City. He initially had a private practice in Harlem, later practicing in Yorkville.

In 1910, Weil was elected to the New York State Assembly as a Democrat, representing the New York County 22nd District. He served in the Assembly in 1911, 1912, and 1913. He lost the 1913 re-election to Republican Benjamin E. Moore. He worked as Assistant District Attorney from 1916 to 1922, first under Edward Swann and then under Joab H. Banton. In 1922, Mayor John F. Hylan appointed him Magistrate to fill a vacancy caused by the death of Magistrate Raphael Tobias. At the end of the three-year term, he was reappointed Magistrate for a full ten-year term.

Weil was president of the Harlem Old Timers, Past Regent of the Manhattan Council of the Royal Arcanum, and a Grand Street Boys Association member, the Elks, the Tribe of Ben-Hur, and the Freemasons. His wife died in 1927, and his children were Robert and Joseph Edward.

Weil died at home from a cardiac attack on March 4, 1932. His funeral took place in the Free Synagogue, with Rabbi Louis I. Newman delivering the eulogy. The pallbearers were members of the Harlem Old Timers Club (which he headed for many years), and his funeral was attended by (among other people) Surrogate John P. O'Brien and a number of magistrates and judges. He was buried in Mount Neboh Cemetery.

New York State Assembly
Preceded by Edward A. Doherty	New York State Assembly; New York County, 22nd District; 1911–1913	Succeeded by Benjamin E. Moore
