= Leon Bleecker =

American lawyer and politician

- Born: c.1881 Mizil, Romania
- Died: October 8, 1933 (aged 51–52)
- Occupations: lawyer, politician
- Years active: 1913–1917
- Known for: New York State Assembly
- Political party: Progressive and Republican

Leon Bleecker (c. 1881 – October 8, 1933) was an American lawyer and politician from New York.

== Life ==
He was born about 1881 in Mizil, Romania. The family emigrated to the United States and settled in Manhattan. He practiced law in New York City.

In November 1913, he was elected on the Progressive and Republican tickets to the New York State Assembly (New York Co., 10th D.), defeating Democrat Walter M. Friedland. Bleecker polled 3,246 votes, and Friedland polled 2,044. Bleecker was a member of the 137th New York State Legislature in 1914.

In November 1915, Bleecker was again elected to the Assembly, defeating the incumbent Friedland. Bleecker polled 2,375 votes, and Friedland polled 2,145. Bleecker was a member of the 139th New York State Legislature in 1916.

He died on October 8, 1933.

New York State Assembly
Preceded by Meyer Greenberg	New York State Assembly; New York County, 10th District; 1914	Succeeded by Walter M. Friedland
Preceded by Walter M. Friedland	New York State Assembly; New York County, 10th District; 1916	Succeeded by Abner Greenberg
