= 136th New York State Legislature =

New York state legislative session

←	135th	137th	→
- New York State Capitol (2009)

Overview
- Legislative body: New York State Legislature
- Jurisdiction: New York, United States
- Term: January 1 – December 31, 1913

Senate
- Members: 51
- President: Lt. Gov. Martin H. Glynn (D), until August 13
- Temporary President: Robert F. Wagner (D)
- Party control: Democratic (33-16-2)

Assembly
- Members: 150
- Speaker: Al Smith (D)
- Party control: Democratic (104-42-4)

Sessions
- 1st: January 1 – May 2, 1913
- 2nd: June 16 – December 12, 1913

The 136th New York State Legislature, consisting of the New York State Senate and the New York State Assembly, met from January 1 to December 12, 1913, while William Sulzer, and then Martin H. Glynn, were Governor of New York, in Albany.

== Background ==
Under the provisions of the New York Constitution of 1894, re-apportioned in 1906 and 1907, 51 Senators and 150 assemblymen were elected in single-seat districts; senators for a two-year term, assemblymen for a one-year term. The senatorial districts were made up of entire counties, except New York County (twelve districts), Kings County (eight districts), Erie County (three districts) and Monroe County (two districts). The Assembly districts were made up of contiguous area, all within the same county.

At this time there were two major political parties: the Republican Party and the Democratic Party. The Progressive Party, the Socialist Party, the Independence League, the Prohibition Party and the Socialist Labor Party also nominated tickets.

== Elections ==
The 1912 New York state election, was held on November 5. Congressman William Sulzer and Martin H. Glynn were elected Governor and Lieutenant Governor; both Democrats. The other seven statewide elective offices up for election were also carried by the Democrats. The approximate party strength at this election, as expressed by the vote for governor, was: Democrats 650,000; Republicans 444,000; Progressives-Independence League 393,000; Socialists 57,000; Prohibition 19,000; and Socialist Labor 4,000.

== Sessions ==
The Legislature met for the regular session at the State Capitol in Albany on January 1, 1913; and adjourned on May 2.

Al Smith (D) was elected Speaker with 102 votes against 42 for Harold J. Hinman (R) and 3 for Michael Schaap (P).

Robert F. Wagner (D) was re-elected President pro tempore of the State Senate.

The Legislature met for a special session at the State Capitol in Albany on June 16. This session was called by Governor Sulzer to try again to amend the primary election law. Instead, the legislators formed a committee to investigate Sulzer. On August 13, Governor Sulzer was impeached by the Assembly with a vote of 79 to 45. Lt. Gov. Glynn then claimed to be Acting Governor, but was contested by Sulzer. After some days, the courts recognized Glynn as Acting Governor, pending the verdict of the impeachment trial.

The Legislature took a recess on August 28; and met again on September 17.

On September 18, 1913, the New York Court for the Trial of Impeachments met in the Senate chamber at the State Capitol in Albany. The trial ended on October 12 with the conviction, and removal from office, of Governor William Sulzer. Lt. Gov. Martin H. Glynn succeeded to the governor's office for the remainder of the term; and President pro tem Robert F. Wagner became Acting Lieutenant Governor.

The Legislature took a recess on October 22; met again on November 10 and took a recess the same day; met again on December 8; and finally adjourned on December 12. On the last day, a Workmen's Compensation Bill was passed.

== State Senate ==
=== Districts ===
- 1st District: Nassau and Suffolk counties
- 2nd District: Queens County, i.e the Borough of Queens
- 3rd, 4th, 5th, 6th, 7th, 8th, 9th and 10th District: Parts of Kings County, i.e. the Borough of Brooklyn
- 11th, 12th, 13th, 14th, 15th, 16th, 17th, 18th, 19th, 20th, 21st and 22nd District: Parts of New York County, i.e. the boroughs of Manhattan and the Bronx
- 23rd District: Richmond and Rockland counties
- 24th District: Westchester County
- 25th District: Orange and Sullivan counties
- 26th District: Columbia, Dutchess and Putnam counties
- 27th District: Greene and Ulster counties
- 28th District: Albany County
- 29th District: Rensselaer County
- 30th District: Saratoga and Washington counties
- 31st District: Montgomery, Schenectady and Schoharie counties
- 32nd District: Lewis, Fulton, Hamilton and Herkimer counties
- 33rd District: Clinton, Essex and Warren counties
- 34th District: Franklin and St. Lawrence counties
- 35th District: Jefferson and Oswego counties
- 36th District: Oneida County
- 37th District: Chenango, Madison and Otsego counties
- 38th District: Onondaga County
- 39th District: Broome and Delaware counties
- 40th District: Cayuga, Cortland and Seneca counties
- 41st District: Chemung, Schuyler, Tioga and Tompkins counties
- 42nd District: Ontario, Wayne and Yates counties
- 43rd District: Steuben and Livingston counties
- 44th District: Allegany, Genesee and Wyoming counties
- 45th and 46th District: Monroe County
- 47th District: Niagara and Orleans counties
- 48th, 49th and 50th District: Erie County
- 51st District: Cattaraugus and Chautauqua counties

=== Senators ===
The asterisk (*) denotes members of the previous Legislature who continued in office as members of this Legislature. John C. Fitzgerald, James A. Foley, John J. Boylan, George A. Blauvelt, John D. Stivers, George H. Whitney, Clayton L. Wheeler, Thomas B. Wilson, John Seeley and Gottfried H. Wende changed from the Assembly to the Senate.

Note: For brevity, the chairmanships omit the words "...the Committee on (the)..."

District	Senator	Party	Notes
1st	Thomas H. O'Keefe	Democrat	
2nd	Bernard M. Patten	Democrat	
3rd	Thomas H. Cullen*	Democrat	Chairman of Cities
4th	Henry P. Velte	Democrat	
5th	William J. Heffernan	Democrat	Chairman of Public Printing
6th	William B. Carswell	Democrat	
7th	Daniel J. Carroll	Democrat	Chairman of Commerce and Navigation
8th	James F. Duhamel*	Democrat	Chairman of Privileges and Elections
9th	Felix J. Sanner*	Democrat	Chairman of Conservation
10th	Herman H. Torborg	Democrat	
11th	Christopher D. Sullivan*	Democrat	Chairman of Miscellaneous Corporations
12th	John C. Fitzgerald*	Democrat	
13th	James D. McClelland*	Democrat	Chairman of Taxation and Retrenchment
14th	James A. Foley*	Democrat	Chairman of Railroads
15th	John J. Boylan*	Democrat	
16th	Robert F. Wagner*	Democrat	re-elected President pro tempore
17th	Walter R. Herrick	Democrat	Chairman of Military Affairs
18th	Henry W. Pollock*	Democrat	Chairman of Banks
19th	Henry Salant	Progr./Ind. L.	contested; seat vacated on April 29
19th	George W. Simpson	Democrat	seated on April 29
20th	James J. Frawley*	Democrat	Chairman of Finance
21st	Stephen J. Stilwell*	Democrat	Chairman of Codes; seat vacated on May 24 upon conviction for bribery
21st	John Davidson	Democrat	elected to fill vacancy, took his seat on November 10: contested by Morris S. Schector (R)
22nd	Anthony J. Griffin*	Democrat	Chairman of Labor and Industry
23rd	George A. Blauvelt*	Democrat	Chairman of Public Education
24th	John F. Healy	Democrat	Chairman of Penal Institutions
25th	John D. Stivers*	Republican	
26th	Franklin D. Roosevelt*	Democrat	Chairman of Agriculture; resigned on March 17 to become Asst. US Secr. of the Navy
26th	James E. Towner	Republican	elected to fill vacancy, took his seat on December 8
27th	Abraham J. Palmer	Progr./Rep.	
28th	Henry M. Sage*	Republican	
29th	John W. McKnight	Democrat	Chairman of Printed and Engrossed Bills
30th	George H. Whitney*	Republican	
31st	Loren H. White*	Democrat	Chairman of Internal Affairs
32nd	Seth G. Heacock*	Republican	
33rd	James A. Emerson*	Republican	
34th	Herbert P. Coats*	Republican	
35th	Elon R. Brown	Republican	Minority Leader
36th	William D. Peckham	Democrat	
37th	Ralph W. Thomas*	Republican	
38th	J. Henry Walters*	Republican	
39th	Clayton L. Wheeler*	Democrat	Chairman of Affairs of Villages
40th	Charles J. Hewitt*	Republican	
41st	John F. Murtaugh*	Democrat	Chairman of Judiciary
42nd	Thomas B. Wilson*	Republican	
43rd	John Seeley*	Democrat	Chairman of Public Health
44th	Thomas H. Bussey*	Republican	
45th	George F. Argetsinger*	Republican	
46th	William L. Ormrod*	Republican	
47th	George F. Thompson	Republican	
48th	John F. Malone	Democrat	Chairman of Canals
49th	Samuel J. Ramsperger*	Democrat	Chairman of Insurance
50th	Gottfried H. Wende*	Democrat	Chairman of Revision
51st	Frank N. Godfrey	Republican	

=== Employees ===
- Clerk: Patrick E. McCabe
- Sergeant-at-Arms: Henry W. Doll
- Stenographer: William F. MacReynolds

== State Assembly ==
Note: For brevity, the chairmanships omit the words "...the Committee on (the)..."

=== Assemblymen ===
District		Assemblymen	Party	Notes
Albany	1st	Harold J. Hinman*	Republican	Minority Leader
Albany	2nd	John G. Malone*	Republican	
Albany	3rd	William C. Baxter	Republican	
Allegany		Ransom L. Richardson*	Republican	
Broome		Mortimer B. Edwards	Republican	
Cattaraugus		Clare Willard	Democrat	
Cayuga		Michael Grace*	Republican	
Chautauqua	1st	George W. Jude	Progressive	
Chautauqua	2nd	John Leo Sullivan*	Republican	
Chemung		Robert P. Bush*	Democrat	Chairman of Ways and Means
Chenango		Walter A. Shepardson*	Republican	
Clinton		Charles J. Vert*	Republican	
Columbia		Alexander W. Hover	Democrat	
Cortland		Niles Freeland Webb	Republican	
Delaware		John W. Telford	Democrat	
Dutchess	1st	Myron Smith*	Republican	
Dutchess	2nd	John Augustus Kelly	Democrat	
Erie	1st	George Frederick Small	Democrat	
Erie	2nd	Clinton T. Horton*	Republican	
Erie	3rd	Albert F. Geyer	Democrat	
Erie	4th	Edward D. Jackson*	Democrat	Chairman of Excise
Erie	5th	Richard F. Hearn*	Democrat	Chairman of Canals
Erie	6th	James M. Rozan*	Democrat	
Erie	7th	Joseph Vincent Fitzgerald	Democrat	a Manager at the impeachment trial
Erie	8th	George Geoghan	Democrat	
Erie	9th	John Dorst Jr.	Democrat	
Essex		Spencer G. Prime II*	Republican	
Franklin		Alexander Macdonald*	Republican	
Fulton and Hamilton		James H. Wood	Republican	
Genesee		Clarence Bryant*	Republican	
Greene		J. Lewis Patrie*	Democrat	Chairman of Labor and Industries
Herkimer		E. Bert Pullman	Democrat	
Jefferson	1st	H. Edmund Machold*	Republican	
Jefferson	2nd	John G. Jones*	Republican	
Kings	1st	John Joseph Kelly	Democrat	
Kings	2nd	William J. Gillen*	Democrat	Chairman of Electricity, Gas and Water Supply; a Manager at the impeachment trial
Kings	3rd	Frank J. Taylor	Democrat	
Kings	4th	Harry W. Kornobis	Democrat	
Kings	5th	Vincent A. O'Connor	Democrat	
Kings	6th	Lester D. Volk	Progressive	
Kings	7th	Daniel F. Farrell*	Democrat	Chairman of Commerce and Navigation
Kings	8th	John J. McKeon*	Democrat	
Kings	9th	Frederick S. Burr	Democrat	
Kings	10th	George E. Dennen	Democrat	
Kings	11th	Karl Soden Deitz	Democrat	
Kings	12th	William Pinkey Hamilton Jr.	Democrat	
Kings	13th	James H. Finnigan	Democrat	
Kings	14th	James J. Garvey*	Democrat	Chairman of Public Printing
Kings	15th	Thomas E. Willmott*	Democrat	Chairman of Charitable and Religious Societies
Kings	16th	Jesse P. Larrimer	Democrat	
Kings	17th	Frederick Ulrich	Democrat	
Kings	18th	Joseph Henry Esquirol	Democrat	
Kings	19th	Jacob Schifferdecker*	Democrat	
Kings	20th	Cornelius J. Cronin	Democrat	
Kings	21st	Harry Heyman*	Democrat	Chairman of Banks
Kings	22nd	Joseph J. Monahan	Democrat	
Kings	23rd	Thomas L. Ingram	Democrat	
Lewis		James B. Van Woert	Democrat	
Livingston		Edward M. Magee	Republican	
Madison		Morell E. Tallett*	Republican	
Monroe	1st	Jared W. Hopkins*	Republican	
Monroe	2nd	Simon L. Adler*	Republican	
Monroe	3rd	August V. Pappert*	Republican	
Monroe	4th	Cyrus W. Phillips*	Republican	
Monroe	5th	Charles H. Gallup	Democrat	Chairman of Public Institutions
Montgomery		Walter A. Gage*	Republican	
Nassau		Thomas B. Maloney	Democrat	
New York	1st	Thomas B. Caughlan*	Democrat	Chairman of Affairs of Cities
New York	2nd	Al Smith*	Democrat	elected Speaker; Chairman of Rules
New York	3rd	Harry E. Oxford	Democrat	
New York	4th	Aaron J. Levy*	Democrat	Majority Leader; a Manager at the impeachment trial
New York	5th	Jimmy Walker*	Democrat	Chairman of Insurance
New York	6th	Jacob Silverstein	Democrat	
New York	7th	Peter P. McElligott*	Democrat	Chairman of General Laws
New York	8th	Solomon Sufrin	Progressive	
New York	9th	Charles D. Donohue	Democrat	
New York	10th	Meyer Greenberg*	Democrat	
New York	11th	John Kerrigan	Democrat	Chairman of Claims
New York	12th	Joseph D. Kelly	Democrat	
New York	13th	James C. Campbell*	Democrat	
New York	14th	Robert Lee Tudor	Democrat	
New York	15th	Theodore Hackett Ward	Democrat	a Manager at the impeachment trial
New York	16th	Martin G. McCue*	Democrat	Chairman of Railroads
New York	17th	Mark Eisner	Democrat	
New York	18th	Mark Goldberg*	Democrat	Chairman of Judiciary
New York	19th	Thomas F. Denney	Democrat	died on November 26, 1913
New York	20th	Patrick J. McGrath*	Democrat	Chairman of Codes
New York	21st	Thomas Kane	Democrat	
New York	22nd	Edward Weil*	Democrat	Chairman of Taxation and Retrenchment
New York	23rd	David Chester Lewis	Democrat	
New York	24th	Owen M. Kiernan	Democrat	
New York	25th	David H. Knott	Democrat	
New York	26th	Abraham Greenberg	Democrat	a Manager at the impeachment trial
New York	27th	Raymond B. Carver	Democrat	
New York	28th	Salvatore A. Cotillo	Democrat	
New York	29th	Charles J. Carroll	Democrat	
New York	30th	Louis A. Cuvillier*	Democrat	Chairman of Military Affairs
New York	31st	Michael Schaap	Progressive	Progressive Leader
New York	32nd	Louis D. Gibbs	Democrat	
New York	33rd	Thomas John Lane	Democrat	
New York	34th	Patrick Joseph McMahon	Democrat	a Manager at the impeachment trial
New York	35th	Ernest E. L. Hammer	Democrat	
Niagara	1st	Eugene L. McCollum	Democrat	
Niagara	2nd	Frank Mead Bradley	Republican	
Oneida	1st	Fred Frank Emden	Democrat	
Oneida	2nd	Herbert E. Allen*	Republican	
Oneida	3rd	John Brayton Fuller*	Republican	
Onondaga	1st	Patrick J. Kelly	Democrat	
Onondaga	2nd	Stephen Gay Daley	Democrat	
Onondaga	3rd	Thomas K. Smith*	Republican	a Manager at the impeachment trial
Ontario		Herman Ferdinand Schnirel	Republican	a Manager at the impeachment trial
Orange	1st	Caleb H. Baumes*	Republican	
Orange	2nd	William Thomas Doty	Democrat	Chairman of Printed and Engrossed Bills
Orleans		Marc Wheeler Cole	Democrat	Chairman of Agriculture
Oswego		Thaddeus C. Sweet*	Republican	
Otsego		LaVerne P. Butts	Democrat	Chairman of Affairs of Villages
Putnam		John R. Yale*	Republican	
Queens	1st	Samuel J. Burden	Democrat	
Queens	2nd	Alfred J. Kennedy*	Democrat	Chairman of Privileges and Elections; resigned on May 12, to take office as Postmaster of Flushing
Queens	3rd	Alfred C. Benninger	Democrat	
Queens	4th	Howard Sutphin	Democrat	
Rensselaer	1st	Charles Fred Schwarz*	Democrat	Chairman of Revision
Rensselaer	2nd	Tracey D. Taylor	Democrat	
Richmond		Ralph R. McKee*	Democrat	Chairman of Public Education
Rockland		Frederick George Grimme	Democrat	
St. Lawrence	1st	Frank L. Seaker*	Republican	
St. Lawrence	2nd	John A. Smith	Republican	
Saratoga		Gilbert T. Seelye	Republican	
Schenectady		Arthur Porter Squire	Democrat	
Schoharie		Edward A. Dox	Democrat	
Schuyler		John W. Gurnett*	Democrat	Chairman of Conservation
Seneca		Augustus S. Hughes	Democrat	
Steuben	1st	Charles A. Brewster	Democrat	Chairman of Soldiers' Home
Steuben	2nd	James L. Seely Jr.	Democrat	
Suffolk	1st	Stephen A. Fallon	Democrat	
Suffolk	2nd	John J. Robinson	Democrat	
Sullivan		John K. Evans*	Democrat	Chairman of Internal Affairs
Tioga		John G. Pembleton*	Republican	
Tompkins		Minor McDaniels*	Democrat	Chairman of Public Health
Ulster	1st	Lawrence M. Kenney	Democrat	
Ulster	2nd	Eldridge M. Gathright	Democrat	
Warren		Henry E. H. Brereton*	Republican	
Washington		Eugene R. Norton	Republican	
Wayne		Albert Yeomans*	Republican	
Westchester	1st	Tracy P. Madden*	Democrat	Chairman of Penal Institutions; a Manager at the impeachment trial
Westchester	2nd	Verne Morgan Bovie	Democrat	
Westchester	3rd	Wilson Randolph Yard	Democrat	
Westchester	4th	Mortimer Charles O'Brien	Democrat	
Wyoming		John Knight	Republican	
Yates		Edward C. Gillett*	Republican	

=== Employees ===
- Clerk: George R. Van Namee
- Sergeant-at-Arms: Lee F. Betts
- Principal Doorkeeper: Charles Durham
- First Assistant Doorkeeper: William Davis
- Second Assistant Doorkeeper: John W. Doty
- Stenographer: Martin Leach

== Sources ==
- MEMBERS OF THE NEW YORK STATE SENATE (for the next session), in The Cornell Daily Sun (Volume XXXIII, Number 76) on December 21, 1912
- LEGISLATURE WON BY THE DEMOCRATS in NYT on November 6, 1912
- FIGHT AMONG REPUBLICANS in NYT on January 1, 1913
- LEGISLATIVE PLUMS SEIZED BY TAMMANY in NYT on January 7, 1913
- Journal of the Assembly (136th Session) (1913, Vol. I; from January 1 to March 18)
- Journal of the Assembly (136th Session) (1913, Vol. IV; Appendix)
- Proceedings in the Court for the Trial of Impeachments in the Matter of the Impeachment of William Sulzer, Governor of the State (1913)
