= John W. McKnight (politician, born 1879) =

American politician (1879–1939)

John W. McKnight

John William McKnight (December 11, 1879 – September 30, 1939) was an American politician who served in the New York State Senate for one term from 1913 to 1914. A Democrat, he represented Rensselaer County in the state's 29th District in the 136th and 137th New York State Legislatures.

McKnight was born on December 11, 1879, in Castleton, the son of John W. McKnight, who himself would serve in the New York State Legislature from 1890 to 1891 in the New York State Assembly.

McKnight worked for 12 years with the New York Central Railroad before becoming supervisor of the town of Schodack. He ran for State Senate in 1912 and received the Democratic nomination before winning election in November.

He ran for reelection in 1914 but lost to Walter A. Wood Jr. McKnight then served as postmaster of Castleton from 1915 to 1924 before being appointed assistant deputy commissioner of the New York State Department of Motor Vehicles in August 1924.

McKnight died on September 30, 1939.

New York State Assembly
Preceded by Victor M. Allen	New York State Senate; 29th District; 1913-1914	Succeeded by Walter A. Wood Jr.
