= Charles H. Fuller =

American lawyer and politician

Charles Humphrey Fuller (January 14, 1859 in Newark, New Jersey – December 5, 1938) was an American lawyer and politician from New York.

== Life ==
He graduated from Amherst College. He practiced law in New York City. He married Mary Everett Webb (1862–1953), and they had several children.

Fuller was a member of the New York State Assembly (Kings Co., 18th D.) in 1905; and of the New York State Senate (8th D.) in 1907 and 1908.

He died on December 5, 1938, and was buried at the Sleepy Hollow Cemetery in North Tarrytown (now Sleepy Hollow).

U.S. Secretary of Commerce William C. Redfield was his brother-in-law.

== Sources ==
- Official New York from Cleveland to Hughes by Charles Elliott Fitch (Hurd Publishing Co., New York and Buffalo, 1911, Vol. IV; pg. 350 and 366)
- C. H. FULLER DIES; RETIRED LAWYER in NYT on December 6, 1938 (subscription required)

New York State Assembly
Preceded by Jacob D. Remsen	New York State Assembly; Kings County, 18th District; 1905	Succeeded by Warren I. Lee
New York State Senate
Preceded by Charles Cooper	New York State Senate; 8th District; 1907–1908	Succeeded by Alvah W. Burlingame Jr.
