= Benjamin E. Moore =

American politician

Benjamin E. Moore was an American politician from New York.

== Life ==
He was a housesmith and bronze erector.

In November 1912, he ran on the Progressive ticket for the New York State Assembly (New York Co., 22nd D.), but was defeated by the incumbent Democrat Edward Weil. Weil polled 3,971 votes, and Moore polled 1,869.

In November 1913, Moore was elected as a Progressive, with Republican and Independence League endorsement, to the State Assembly, defeating the incumbent Weil. Moore polled 3,799 votes, and Weil polled 2,739.) Moore was a member of the 137th New York State Legislature in 1914.

In November 1914, he ran for re-election, but was defeated by Democrat Maurice Bloch, Bloch polled 3,031 votes, Moore polled 1,575 votes and Republican William J. Seifert polled 1,416.

New York State Assembly
Preceded by Edward Weil	New York State Assembly; New York County, 22nd District; 1914	Succeeded by Maurice Bloch
