= Harry E. Oxford =

English-born American politician (1866–1915)

Harry E. Oxford (1866 – February 5, 1915) was an English-born American politician from New York.

== Life ==
Oxford was born in 1866 in England. He immigrated to America with his parents as a baby and settled in New York City, New York.

Oxford attended public school in New York City, after which he attended the real estate business. An active member of the Democratic Party since he reached voting age, he was a member of Tammany Hall and a leader of the Democratic Party in his Assembly district. In 1901, he was elected to the New York State Assembly as a Democrat, representing the New York County 6th District. He served in the Assembly in 1902 and 1903.

After leaving the Assembly, Oxford served as Sergeant-at-Arms of the New York City Board of Aldermen for six years. He also served as Sergeant-at-Arms for the New York State Senate in 1912. He was elected back to the Assembly that year, now representing the New York County 3rd District. He served in the Assembly in 1913. He was an elected delegate to the 1915 New York State Constitutional Convention, but he died before the Convention and Morgan J. O'Brien was appointed to replace him.

Oxford died at home on February 5, 1915. He had a wife and six children.

New York State Assembly
Preceded by Timothy P. Sullivan	New York State Assembly; New York County, 6th District; 1902–1903	Succeeded by Charles Anderson
Preceded by John C. Fitzgerald	New York State Assembly; New York County, 3rd District; 1913	Succeeded by John B. Golden
