= William D. Peckham =

American politician

Wlliam D. Peckham

William D. Peckham (ca. 1874 – September 9, 1940) was an American politician and doctor who served in the New York State Senate for a two-year term from 1913 to 1914. A Democrat, he represented New York's 36th district in the 136th and 137th New York State Legislatures.

== Early life and career ==
Peckham was born in Chatsworth, Illinois, the son of Nathan and Jennie (Morrison) Peckham. As an infant, he and his family moved to Westmoreland, New York. He attended Oakwood Seminary in Union Springs. He graduated from Baltimore Medical College in 1897 and opened a medical practice in Utica. On April 5, 1907, he was named health officer for the Utica Board of Health.

== Political career ==
In August 1912, Peckham received the Democratic nomination for state senator. He won election in November to represent the state's 36th district. Early returns placed him nearly 500 votes ahead of opponent Charles W. Wicks, but a review of tally sheets and voting machines revealed he won by only 176.

While in the State Senate on October 16, 1913, he voted in the minority not to impeach Governor William Sulzer.

Peckham ran for reelection in 1914, but lost his State Senate seat to Wicks in November. He again unsuccessfully opposed Wicks in November 1916.

== Later life ==
After leaving politics, Peckham served as health officer for the consolidated health departments of Marcy and Floyd and was secretary of the Oneida County Public Health Nursing Committee. On September 12, 1936 Governor Herbert H. Lehman appointed Peckham Oneida County coroner.

During World War II, he served as an examiner for the Utica draft board.

Peckham died at his home in Utica on September 9, 1940.

New York State Senate
Preceded by T. Harvey Ferris	New York State Senate; 36th District; 1913–1914	Succeeded by Charles W. Wicks
