= 137th New York State Legislature =

New York state legislative session

| ← | 136th | 138th | → |
- New York State Capitol (2009)

Overview
- Legislative body: New York State Legislature
- Jurisdiction: New York, United States
- Term: January 1 – December 31, 1914

Senate
- Members: 51
- President: vacant
- Temporary President: Robert F. Wagner (D)
- Party control: Democratic (33-18)

Assembly
- Members: 150
- Speaker: Thaddeus C. Sweet (R)
- Party control: Republican (81-48-21)

Sessions
- 1st: January 7 – March 28, 1914
- 2nd: May 4 – 20, 1914

The 137th New York State Legislature, consisting of the New York State Senate and the New York State Assembly, met from January 7 to May 20, 1914, while Martin H. Glynn was Governor of New York, in Albany.

== Background ==
Under the provisions of the New York Constitution of 1894, re-apportioned in 1906 and 1907, 51 Senators and 150 assemblymen were elected in single-seat districts; senators for a two-year term, assemblymen for a one-year term. The senatorial districts were made up of entire counties, except New York County (twelve districts), Kings County (eight districts), Erie County (three districts) and Monroe County (two districts). The Assembly districts were made up of contiguous areas within the same county.

At this time there were two major political parties: the Republican Party and the Democratic Party. The Progressive Party, the Socialist Party, the Independence League and the Prohibition Party also nominated tickets.

== Elections ==
The 1913 New York state election, was held on November 4. The only two statewide elective offices up for election were two judgeships on the New York Court of Appeals. Democrat Willard Bartlett was elected Chief Judge, and Republican Frank H. Hiscock was elected an associate judge, which had been cross-endorsed by the Independence League. The approximate party strength at this election, as expressed by the vote for Chief Judge, was: Democrats-Independence League 600,000; Republicans 597,000; Progressives 195,000; Socialists 62,000; and Prohibition 17,000.

Ex-Governor William Sulzer, who had been impeached, and removed from office in September 1913, was elected to the Assembly on the Progressive ticket.

== Sessions ==
The Legislature met for the regular session at the State Capitol in Albany on January 7, 1914; and adjourned on March 28.

Thaddeus C. Sweet (R) was elected Speaker with 81 votes against 48 for Al Smith (D) and 21 for Michael Schaap (P).

John F. Murtaugh (D) was elected Majority Leader of the New York State Senate. At the same time, Robert F. Wagner (D) continued as president pro tempore of the State Senate and Acting Lieutenant Governor.

On February 25, the Legislature elected Homer D. Call (P) as New York State Treasurer, to fill the vacancy caused by the suicide of John J. Kennedy (D). Call was elected by a combination of Democrats and Progressives with 98 votes against 96 for Republican William Archer.

The Legislature met for a special session at the State Capitol in Albany on May 4, 1914; and adjourned on May 20. This session was called because the Democratic Senate majority and the Republican Assembly majority were at odds over the State's budget, and did not approve the necessary financial appropriations during the regular session.

== State Senate ==
=== Districts ===
- 1st District: Nassau and Suffolk counties
- 2nd District: Queens County, i.e the Borough of Queens
- 3rd, 4th, 5th, 6th, 7th, 8th, 9th and 10th District: Parts of Kings County, i.e. the Borough of Brooklyn
- 11th, 12th, 13th, 14th, 15th, 16th, 17th, 18th, 19th and 20th District: Parts of New York County, i.e. the Borough of Manhattan
- 21st and 22nd District: Parts of Bronx County, i.e. the Borough of the Bronx
- 23rd District: Richmond and Rockland counties
- 24th District: Westchester County
- 25th District: Orange and Sullivan counties
- 26th District: Columbia, Dutchess and Putnam and counties
- 27th District: Greene and Ulster counties
- 28th District: Albany County
- 29th District: Rensselaer County
- 30th District: Saratoga and Washington counties
- 31st District: Montgomery, Schenectady and Schoharie counties
- 32nd District: Lewis, Fulton, Hamilton and Herkimer counties
- 33rd District: Clinton, Essex and Warren counties
- 34th District: Franklin and St. Lawrence counties
- 35th District: Jefferson and Oswego counties
- 36th District: Oneida County
- 37th District: Chenango, Madison and Otsego counties
- 38th District: Onondaga County
- 39th District: Broome and Delaware counties
- 40th District: Cayuga, Cortland and Seneca counties
- 41st District: Chemung, Schuyler, Tioga and Tompkins counties
- 42nd District: Ontario, Wayne and Yates counties
- 43rd District: Steuben and Livingston counties
- 44th District: Allegany, Genesee and Wyoming counties
- 45th and 46th District: Monroe County
- 47th District: Niagara and Orleans counties
- 48th, 49th and 50th District: Erie County
- 51st District: Cattaraugus and Chautauqua counties

=== Members ===
The asterisk (*) denotes members of the previous Legislature who continued in office as members of this Legislature.

Note: For brevity, the chairmanships omit the words "...the Committee on (the)..."

| District | Senator | Party | Notes |
|---|---|---|---|
| 1st | Thomas H. O'Keefe* | Democrat | |
| 2nd | Bernard M. Patten* | Democrat | |
| 3rd | Thomas H. Cullen* | Democrat | Chairman of Cities |
| 4th | Henry P. Velte* | Democrat | |
| 5th | William J. Heffernan* | Democrat | Chairman of Public Printing |
| 6th | William B. Carswell* | Democrat | |
| 7th | Daniel J. Carroll* | Democrat | Chairman of Commerce and Navigation |
| 8th | James F. Duhamel* | Democrat | Chairman of Privileges and Elections |
| 9th | Felix J. Sanner* | Democrat | Chairman of Conservation |
| 10th | Herman H. Torborg* | Democrat | |
| 11th | Christopher D. Sullivan* | Democrat | Chairman of Miscellaneous Corporations |
| 12th | John C. Fitzgerald* | Democrat | |
| 13th | James D. McClelland* | Democrat | Chairman of Taxation and Retrenchment |
| 14th | James A. Foley* | Democrat | Chairman of Railroads |
| 15th | John J. Boylan* | Democrat | |
| 16th | Robert F. Wagner* | Democrat | President pro tempore |
| 17th | Walter R. Herrick* | Democrat | Chairman of Military Affairs |
| 18th | Henry W. Pollock* | Democrat | Chairman of Banks |
| 19th | George W. Simpson* | Democrat | |
| 20th | James J. Frawley* | Democrat | Chairman of Finance |
| 21st | John Davidson* | Democrat | |
| 22nd | Anthony J. Griffin* | Democrat | Chairman of Labor and Industry |
| 23rd | George A. Blauvelt* | Democrat | Chairman of Public Education |
| 24th | John F. Healy* | Democrat | Chairman of Penal Institutions |
| 25th | John D. Stivers* | Republican | |
| 26th | James E. Towner* | Republican | |
| 27th | Abraham J. Palmer* | Progr./Rep. | elected as a Progressive with Republican endorsement, joined the Republicans after the election of Call as Treasurer |
| 28th | Henry M. Sage* | Republican | |
| 29th | John W. McKnight* | Democrat | Chairman of Printed and Engrossed Bills |
| 30th | George H. Whitney* | Republican | |
| 31st | Loren H. White* | Democrat | Chairman of Internal Affairs |
| 32nd | Seth G. Heacock* | Republican | |
| 33rd | James A. Emerson* | Republican | |
| 34th | Herbert P. Coats* | Republican | |
| 35th | Elon R. Brown* | Republican | Minority Leader |
| 36th | William D. Peckham* | Democrat | |
| 37th | Ralph W. Thomas* | Republican | |
| 38th | J. Henry Walters* | Republican | |
| 39th | Clayton L. Wheeler* | Democrat | Chairman of Affairs of Villages |
| 40th | Charles J. Hewitt* | Republican | |
| 41st | John F. Murtaugh* | Democrat | Majority Leader; Chairman of Judiciary |
| 42nd | Thomas B. Wilson* | Republican | |
| 43rd | John Seeley* | Democrat | Chairman of Public Health |
| 44th | Thomas H. Bussey* | Republican | |
| 45th | George F. Argetsinger* | Republican | |
| 46th | William L. Ormrod* | Republican | |
| 47th | George F. Thompson* | Republican | |
| 48th | John F. Malone* | Democrat | Chairman of Canals |
| 49th | Samuel J. Ramsperger* | Democrat | Chairman of Insurance |
| 50th | Gottfried H. Wende* | Democrat | Chairman of Revision |
| 51st | Frank N. Godfrey* | Republican | |

=== Employees ===
- Clerk: Patrick E. McCabe
- Sergeant-at-Arms: Henry W. Doll
- Stenographer: William F. MacReynolds

== State Assembly ==
Note: For brevity, the chairmanships omit the words "...the Committee on (the)..."

=== Assemblymen ===
| District | | Assemblymen | Party | Notes |
|---|---|---|---|---|
| Albany | 1st | Harold J. Hinman* | Republican | Majority Leader |
| Albany | 2nd | John G. Malone* | Republican | Chairman of Excise |
| Albany | 3rd | William C. Baxter* | Republican | Chairman of Social Welfare |
| Allegany | | Elmer E. Ferry | Republican | |
| Broome | | Simon P. Quick | Republican | |
| Cattaraugus | | Clare Willard* | Democrat | |
| Cayuga | | Charles H. Springer | Republican | |
| Chautauqua | 1st | A. Morelle Cheney | Republican | |
| Chautauqua | 2nd | John Leo Sullivan* | Republican | Chairman of Internal Affairs |
| Chemung | | Wilmot E. Knapp | R/Progr./IL/Proh. | |
| Chenango | | Samuel A. Jones | Republican | |
| Clinton | | Alexander W. Fairbank | Republican | |
| Columbia | | Alexander W. Hover* | Democrat | |
| Cortland | | Niles Freeland Webb* | Republican | Chairman of Revision |
| Delaware | | Edwin A. Mackey | Republican | |
| Dutchess | 1st | Cornelius W. Garrison | Progr./Dem. | |
| Dutchess | 2nd | Mark G. DuBois | Republican | |
| Erie | 1st | William H. Warhus | Democrat | |
| Erie | 2nd | Clinton T. Horton* | Rep./Progr. | Chairman of Insurance |
| Erie | 3rd | Albert F. Geyer* | Dem./Progr. | |
| Erie | 4th | Patrick W. Quigley | Republican | |
| Erie | 5th | Richard F. Hearn* | Democrat | |
| Erie | 6th | Leo F. Tucholka | Democrat | |
| Erie | 7th | William P. Greiner | Democrat | |
| Erie | 8th | Wallace Thayer | Progr./Dem. | |
| Erie | 9th | Frank B. Thorn | Republican | Chairman of Codes |
| Essex | | Raymond T. Kenyon | Republican | |
| Franklin | | Alexander Macdonald* | Republican | Chairman of Ways and Means |
| Fulton and Hamilton | | James H. Wood* | Republican | |
| Genesee | | Louis H. Wells | Republican | |
| Greene | | George H. Chase | Republican | |
| Herkimer | | Franklin W. Cristman | Republican | |
| Jefferson | 1st | H. Edmund Machold* | Republican | Chairman of Agriculture |
| Jefferson | 2nd | John G. Jones* | Republican | Chairman of Conservation |
| Kings | 1st | R. Hunter McQuistion | Rep./I.L. | |
| Kings | 2nd | William J. Gillen* | Democrat | |
| Kings | 3rd | Frank J. Taylor* | Democrat | |
| Kings | 4th | George Langhorst | Rep./I.L. | Chairman of Public Printing |
| Kings | 5th | Charles C. Lockwood | Rep./I.L. | |
| Kings | 6th | George H. Ittleman | Progr./Rep./I.L. | |
| Kings | 7th | Daniel F. Farrell* | Democrat | |
| Kings | 8th | John J. McKeon* | Democrat | |
| Kings | 9th | William J. McRoberts | Progr./Rep./I.L. | |
| Kings | 10th | Fred M. Ahern | Rep./I.L. | Chairman of Claims |
| Kings | 11th | George R. Brennan | Republican | |
| Kings | 12th | William T. Simpson | Rep./I.L. | |
| Kings | 13th | Herman Kramer | Democrat | |
| Kings | 14th | John Peter LaFrenz | Progr./Rep./I.L. | |
| Kings | 15th | James J. Phelan | Democrat | |
| Kings | 16th | Samuel R. Green | Republican | |
| Kings | 17th | Alvah W. Burlingame Jr. | Republican | Chairman of Military Affairs |
| Kings | 18th | Almeth W. Hoff | Rep./I.L. | Chairman of Cities |
| Kings | 19th | Henry Scheidemann | Progr./Rep. | |
| Kings | 20th | August C. Flamman | Republican | |
| Kings | 21st | Henry C. Karpen | Progr./Rep./I.L. | |
| Kings | 22nd | Edward R. W. Karutz | Republican | Chairman of Printed and Engrossed Bills |
| Kings | 23rd | William F. Mathewson | Republican | Chairman of Penal Institutions |
| Lewis | | Henry L. Grant | Republican | |
| Livingston | | Edward M. Magee* | Republican | |
| Madison | | Morell E. Tallett* | Republican | Chairman of Public Education |
| Monroe | 1st | Horace B. Warner | Progressive | |
| Monroe | 2nd | Simon L. Adler* | Republican | Chairman of Banks |
| Monroe | 3rd | George A. Ritz | Democrat | |
| Monroe | 4th | Cyrus W. Phillips* | Republican | Chairman of Judiciary |
| Monroe | 5th | Charles H. Gallup* | Democrat | |
| Montgomery | | Walter A. Gage* | Republican | Chairman of Affairs of Villages |
| Nassau | | LeRoy J. Weed | Progr./Dem./I.L. | |
| New York | 1st | Thomas B. Caughlan* | Democrat | |
| New York | 2nd | Al Smith* | Democrat | Minority Leader |
| New York | 3rd | John B. Golden | Democrat | |
| New York | 4th | Henry S. Schimmel | Dem./I.L. | |
| New York | 5th | Jimmy Walker* | Democrat | |
| New York | 6th | William Sulzer | Ind. Progr. | |
| New York | 7th | Peter P. McElligott* | Democrat | |
| New York | 8th | Solomon Sufrin* | Progressive | |
| New York | 9th | Charles D. Donohue* | Democrat | |
| New York | 10th | Leon Bleecker | Progr./Rep. | |
| New York | 11th | John Kerrigan* | Democrat | |
| New York | 12th | Joseph D. Kelly* | Dem./I.L. | |
| New York | 13th | James C. Campbell* | Democrat | |
| New York | 14th | Robert Lee Tudor* | Democrat | |
| New York | 15th | Abram Ellenbogen | Rep./I.L. | |
| New York | 16th | Martin G. McCue* | Democrat | |
| New York | 17th | Mark Eisner* | Dem./Progr. | |
| New York | 18th | Mark Goldberg* | Democrat | |
| New York | 19th | Andrew F. Murray | Progr./I.L. | |
| New York | 20th | Patrick J. McGrath* | Democrat | |
| New York | 21st | Dean Nelson | Rep./I.L. | Chairman of Soldiers' Home |
| New York | 22nd | Benjamin E. Moore | Progr./Rep./I.L. | |
| New York | 23rd | Sidney C. Crane | Rep./I.L. | Chairman of Public Institutions |
| New York | 24th | Owen M. Kiernan* | Democrat | |
| New York | 25th | Francis R. Stoddard Jr. | Rep./I.L. | Chairman of Charitable and Religious Institutions |
| New York | 26th | Abraham Greenberg* | Dem./I.L. | seat contested |
| New York | 26th | Joseph Steinberg | Progressive | seated on March 27, 1914 |
| New York | 27th | Schuyler M. Meyer | Progr./Rep. | |
| New York | 28th | George E. Findlater | Progr./Rep./I.L. | |
| New York | 29th | Howard Conkling | Rep./I.L. | Chairman of Canals; and of Public Lands |
| New York | 30th | Edward S. Boylston | Rep./Progr./I.L. | |
| New York | 31st | Michael Schaap* | Progr./I.L. | Progressive Leader |
| Bronx | 32nd | Louis P. Grimler | Republican | |
| Bronx | 33rd | Thomas John Lane* | Democrat | |
| Bronx | 34th | Otto Henschel | Progr./I.L. | contested by Patrick Joseph McMahon (D) |
| Bronx | 35th | Henry D. Patton | Progr./Rep./I.L. | |
| Niagara | 1st | William Bewley | Republican | |
| Niagara | 2nd | John W. Williams | Democrat | |
| Oneida | 1st | Fred Frank Emden* | Democrat | |
| Oneida | 2nd | Charles J. Fuess | Republican | |
| Oneida | 3rd | John Brayton Fuller* | Republican | Chairman of Commerce and Navigation |
| Onondaga | 1st | Edward Arnts | Republican | |
| Onondaga | 2nd | George M. Haight | Democrat | |
| Onondaga | 3rd | Jacob R. Buecheler | Republican | |
| Ontario | | Heber E. Wheeler | Republican | |
| Orange | 1st | James B. Montgomery | Republican | |
| Orange | 2nd | Charles J. Boyd | Republican | |
| Orleans | | Coley P. Wright | Dem./Progr. | |
| Oswego | | Thaddeus C. Sweet* | Republican | elected Speaker; Chairman of Rules |
| Otsego | | George L. Bockes | Republican | |
| Putnam | | Hamilton Fish III | Progressive | |
| Queens | 1st | Nicholas Nehrbauer Jr. | Democrat | |
| Queens | 2nd | Peter J. McGarry | Dem./I.L. | |
| Queens | 3rd | Conrad Garbe | Rep./I.L. | |
| Queens | 4th | James Suydam Eadie | Rep./Progr. | |
| Rensselaer | 1st | Charles Fred Schwarz* | Democrat | |
| Rensselaer | 2nd | Tracey D. Taylor* | Democrat | |
| Richmond | | Calvin D. Van Name | Democrat | |
| Rockland | | Beveridge C. Dunlop | Progressive | |
| St. Lawrence | 1st | Frank L. Seaker* | Republican | Chairman of Railroads |
| St. Lawrence | 2nd | John A. Smith* | Republican | Chairman of General Laws |
| Saratoga | | Gilbert T. Seelye* | Republican | Chairman of Public Health |
| Schenectady | | Arthur Porter Squire* | Democrat | |
| Schoharie | | Edward A. Dox* | Democrat | |
| Schuyler | | Henry S. Howard | Republican | |
| Seneca | | William J. Maier | Republican | Chairman of Electricity, Gas and Water Supply |
| Steuben | 1st | Charles A. Brewster* | Democrat | |
| Steuben | 2nd | James L. Seely Jr.* | Democrat | |
| Suffolk | 1st | DeWitt C. Talmage | Republican | Chairman of Labor and Industry |
| Suffolk | 2nd | Henry A. Murphy | Republican | contested by James W. Eaton |
| Sullivan | | George H. Smith | Democrat | |
| Tioga | | Wilson S. Moore | Republican | |
| Tompkins | | John W. Preswick | Republican | |
| Ulster | 1st | Henry R. DeWitt | Republican | |
| Ulster | 2nd | Abram P. Lefevre | Republican | |
| Warren | | Henry E. H. Brereton* | Republican | Chairman of Privileges and Elections |
| Washington | | Charles O. Pratt | Republican | |
| Wayne | | Riley A. Wilson | Republican | |
| Westchester | 1st | George Blakely | Republican | |
| Westchester | 2nd | August L. Martin | Democrat | |
| Westchester | 3rd | Walter W. Law Jr. | Republican | |
| Westchester | 4th | Floy D. Hopkins | Republican | |
| Wyoming | | John Knight* | Republican | |
| Yates | | Edward C. Gillett* | Republican | Chairman of Taxation and Retrenchment |

=== Employees ===
- Clerk: Fred W. Hammond
- Sergeant-at-Arms: Harry W. Haines
- Principal Doorkeeper: Fred R. Smith
- First Assistant Doorkeeper: James B. Hulse
- Second Assistant Doorkeeper: Michael Kehoe
- Stenographer: Henry C. Lammert
- Postmaster: James H. Underwood

== Sources ==
- MEMBERS OF THE NEW YORK STATE SENATE (for the next two sessions), in The Cornell Daily Sun (Volume XXXIII, Number 76) on December 21, 1912
- VOTERS' GUIDE FOR THE NEW ASSEMBLY in The New York Times on October 26, 1913
- GREATER NEW YORK AND LONG ISLAND VOTE in the Brooklyn Daily Eagle on November 5, 1913
- REPUBLICANS' MARGIN IN NEXT ASSEMBLY 20 in the New York Tribune on November 6, 1913
- CAUCUS CHOOSES SWEET FOR SPEAKER in The New York Times on January 7, 1914
- COMMITTEE PLUMS GO TO BARNES MEN in The New York Times on January 20, 1914
- POLICE BILL KILLED BY ASSEMBLY VOTE in The New York Times on March 25, 1914
- FEW GOOD WORDS FOR ASSEMBLYMEN in The New York Times on August 13, 1914
