= Solomon Sufrin =

American politician

Solomon Sufrin (November 17, 1881 – April 2, 1931) was an American politician from New York.

== Life ==
He was born on November 17, 1881, in Iași, Romania. He attended the public schools in Iași, and the École Normale Israélite Orientale in Paris. In 1900, he emigrated to the United States and settled in New York City. He graduated LL.B. from New York University School of Law in 1905, was admitted to the bar, and practiced law in New York City.

In November 1912, he was elected on the Progressive ticket to the New York State Assembly (New York Co., 8th D.), defeating the incumbent Democrat Moritz Graubard. Sufrin was re-elected in November 1913. He was a member of the State Assembly in 1913 and 1914, sitting in the 136th and 137th New York State Legislatures. Afterwards he became a prominent activist in many Jewish organizations. In 1916, he supported President Woodrow Wilson for re-election.

He died on April 2, 1931, after a long illness; and was buried at the Mount Carmel Cemetery in Glendale, Queens.

New York State Assembly
Preceded by Moritz Graubard	New York State Assembly; New York County, 8th District; 1913–1914	Succeeded by Sidney Scharlin
