= Aaron J. Levy =

American politician

Aaron Jefferson Levy (July 4, 1881 – November 21, 1955) was an American lawyer and politician from New York.

== Life and career ==
He was born on July 4, 1881, in New York City. He is the son of Jacob Levy and Annabella (Bernstein) Levy (1862–1945). He attended the public schools and Cooper Union. He graduated LL.B. from New York University School of Law in 1902. He practiced law in New York City. On March 10, 1903, he married Libbie Finkelstein, and they had two children.

Levy was a member of the New York State Assembly (New York Co., 4th D.) in 1908, 1909, 1910, 1911, 1912 and 1913. He was Chairman of the Committee on the Judiciary in 1911; and Majority Leader in 1913. He was also the chairman of the managers on behalf of the Assembly (i.e. the prosecution team) at the impeachment trial of Governor William Sulzer in 1913. He was an alternate delegate to the 1912 Democratic National Convention.

In November 1913, he was elected to the New York City Municipal Court; and he was President of the Board of Municipal Justices from 1916 to 1923. In November 1923, he was elected to the New York Supreme Court. In 1937, when he ran for re-election, the Citizens Union urged voters to vote him down, but he was re-elected nevertheless.

He died on November 21, 1955, in St. Petersburg, Florida, of a heart attack; and was buried at the Mokom Sholem Cemetery in Ozone Park, Queens.

== Sources ==
New York State Assembly
Preceded by William H. Burns	New York State Assembly; New York County, 4th District; 1908–1913	Succeeded by Henry S. Schimmel
Political offices
Preceded by Frank L. Young	Majority Leader of the New York State Assembly; 1913	Succeeded by Harold J. Hinman
