= Harry Heyman =

American politician (1875–1932)

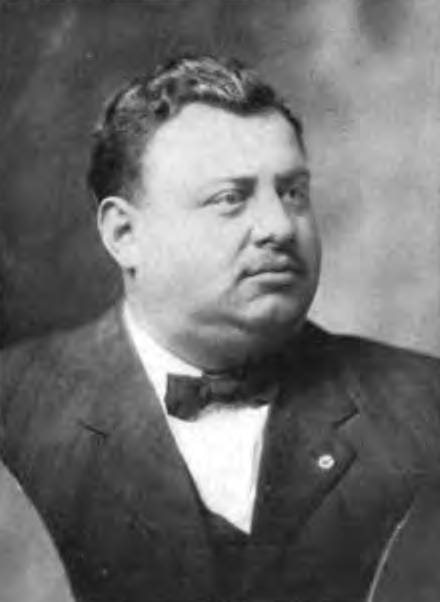
Heyman's official State Assembly portrait, 1911

Harry Heyman (October 3, 1875 – October 29, 1932) was a Jewish-American butcher and politician from New York.

== Life ==
Heyman was born on October 3, 1875, in Bethlehem, Pennsylvania. He moved to Brooklyn, New York, with his parents when he was a baby. He graduated from Public School No. 23 and worked as a butcher in Brooklyn.

In 1909, Heyman ran for the New York State Assembly as a Democrat in the Kings County 21st District. He lost the election to Republican Sam Weinstein. In 1910, he again ran for the Assembly and was elected over Weinstein. He served in the Assembly in 1911, 1912, and 1913. He was defeated for re-election in 1913 by Henry C. Karpen. He served as a delegate to the 1915 New York State Constitutional Convention, by which point he was working in the real estate business.

In 1915, Heyman was elected to the New York City Board of Aldermen over the Republican incumbent A. M. Levy, representing the 62nd Aldermanic District. He lost the 1917 re-election to Socialist Baruch Charney Vladeck, despite receiving support from the Republican Party in the election. In January 1918, he was appointed Deputy Warden of the Civil Prison. In 1919, he again ran for election as Alderman and again lost the election to Vladeck. By 1922, he was Deputy County Clerk. In June 1930, he was appointed clerk to the Passport Bureau, a new division of the County Clerk's office. He was reappointed clerk in January 1931. By the time he died, he was chief of the Passport Bureau.

Heyman was grand chancellor of the local Knights of Pythias lodge and the state field deputy, chairman of the board of directors of the Eastern District Boys' Association, a member of the Loyal Order of Moose, the Odd Fellows, the Hebrew Mutual Benefit Society, the Hebrew Free Burial Society of Brooklyn, Order Brith Abraham, the Tambury Democratic Association, and the Wantagh Democratic Club, and the standard-bearer of the Harry Heyman Democratic Club of the 21st Assembly District. An active member of the Foresters of America, he was a member of several related organizations, organized a local group, and served as Deputy Grand Chief Ranger and Supreme Representative.

In 1896, Heyman married Fanny Simon. She died from a four-year illness in 1918. He then married widow Clara Graf in 1922. His children were Lillian Katz, Ruth Miller, Emanuel, Jack, Sidney, and Daniel.

Heyman died at home from a brief illness on October 29, 1932. Special Sessions Justice Harry Howard Dale, County Clerk John N. Harman, Sewers Commissioner Joseph Lentol, and a delegation of employees in the County Clerk's office were among those who attended his funeral at the Kirschbaum Funeral Parlors. He was buried in Mount Lebanon Cemetery.

New York State Assembly
Preceded by Sam Weinstein	New York State Assembly; Kings County, 21st District; 1911–1913	Succeeded by Henry C. Karpen
