= John J. Cassin =

American politician

John Joseph Cassin (August 15, 1840 – January 1, 1901) was an American politician from New York.

== Life ==
Cassin was born on August 15, 1840, in Greenbush, New York, near Rensselaer. His parents were Irish. He worked as a hotel keeper and an agent. He served as town supervisor for Greenbush for two terms and Acting Superintendent of the Poor of Rensselaer County for nine years.

In 1891, Cassin was elected to the New York State Assembly as a Democrat, representing the Rensselaer County 3rd District. He served in the Assembly in 1892, 1893, and 1894.

In 1900, Cassin's son drowned while skating. He moved to Albany shortly afterwards. He never recovered from his son's death, and he died in his Albany home on January 1, 1901. He was buried in St. Agnes Cemetery.

New York State Assembly
Preceded by John W. McKnight	New York State Assembly; Rensselaer County, 3rd District; 1892-1894	Succeeded by John P. Cole
