= Caleb H. Baumes =

American lawyer and politician

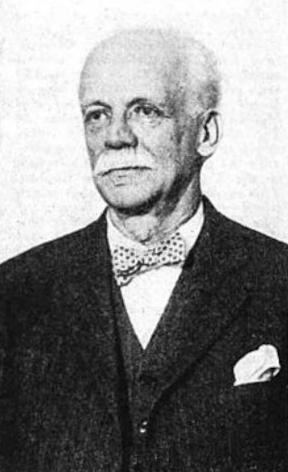

Member of the New York State Senate from the 27th district
- In office 1919–1930
- Preceded by: Charles W. Walton
- Succeeded by: Thomas C. Desmond

Member of the New York State Assembly from the 1st district
- In office 1909–1913
- Preceded by: Henry Seacord
- Succeeded by: James B. Montgomery

Personal details
- Born: March 31, 1863 Bethlehem, New York, U.S.
- Died: September 25, 1937 (aged 74) New York, U.S.

Caleb Howard Baumes (March 31, 1863 Bethlehem, Albany County, New York – September 25, 1937 near Hudson, New York) was an American lawyer and politician from New York.

== Life ==
He was born on March 31, 1863, in Bethlehem, New York.

He married in 1883 and had two sons.

He was a member of the New York State Assembly (Orange Co., 1st D.) in 1909, 1910, 1911, 1912 and 1913.

He was a member of the New York State Senate (27th D.) from 1919 to 1930, sitting in the 142nd, 143rd, 144th, 145th, 146th, 147th, 148th, 149th, 150th, 151st, 152nd and 153rd New York State Legislatures. He championed a 1926 law mandating life imprisonment for four-time felony offenders, the Baumes law.

At the New York state election, 1930, he ran on the Republican ticket for Lieutenant Governor of New York with Albert Ottinger but they were defeated by Democrats Franklin D. Roosevelt and Herbert H. Lehman. Afterwards he resumed the practice of law.

He died while riding on a train on September 25, 1937, near Hudson, New York when returning from an Odd Fellows convention in Milwaukee.

New York State Assembly
Preceded by Henry Seacord	New York State Assembly; Orange County, 1st District; 1909–1913	Succeeded by James B. Montgomery
New York State Senate
Preceded by Charles W. Walton	New York State Senate; 27th District; 1919–1930	Succeeded by Thomas C. Desmond
Party political offices
Preceded by Charles C. Lockwood	Republican Party Nominee for Lieutenant Governor of New York; 1930	Succeeded by F. Trubee Davison
