= Otto Henschel =

American politician

Otto Henschel (January 21, 1880 – August 27, 1961) was an American lawyer and politician from New York.

== Life ==
He was born on January 21, 1880, in New York City. He attended Harlem Evening High School. He graduated from New York Law School, and practiced law in the Bronx.

In November 1912, he ran on the Progressive ticket for the New York State Assembly (New York Co., 34th D.), but was defeated by Democrat Patrick Joseph McMahon.

In November 1913, Henschel was elected as a Progressive, with Independence League endorsement, to the State Assembly, defeating the incumbent McMahon. Henschel polled 6,712 votes, McMahon polled 6,684 votes, and Republican Theodore Reple polled 5,975. Henschel was a member of the 137th New York State Legislature in 1914. McMahon unsuccessfully contested Henschel's election.

In November 1914, he ran on the Republican ticket for the New York State Senate (22nd D.), but was defeated by Democrat James A. Hamilton. Hamilton polled 23,107 votes, and Henschel polled 19,469.

In November 1915, he ran on the Republican and Independence League tickets for the State Assembly, but was defeated by the incumbent Democrat M. Maldwin Fertig. Fertig polled 10,632 votes, and Henschel polled 6,879.

Henschel died on August 27, 1961, at his home at 48 West 73rd Street in Manhattan.

New York State Assembly
| Preceded by Patrick Joseph McMahon | New York State Assembly; New York County, 34th District; 1914 | Succeeded by M. Maldwin Fertig |
