= Charles W. Walton (New York politician) =

American politician

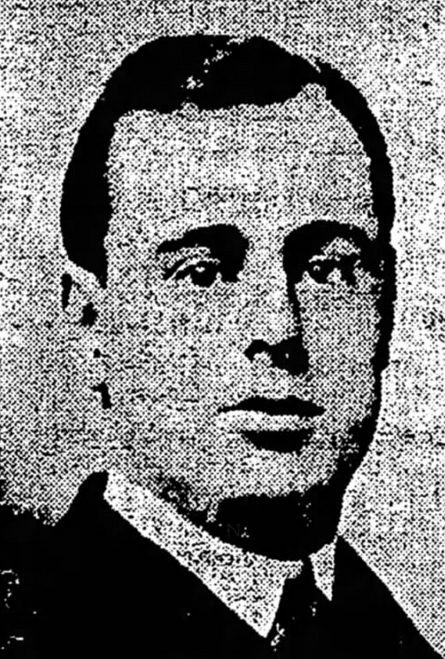

Member of the New York State Senate
- In office 1915–1922
- Constituency: 27th, 29th Districts

Personal details
- Born: November 13, 1875 Olive Branch, New York
- Died: March 19, 1945 (aged 69) Kingston, New York
- Party: Republican
- Occupation: Lawyer, politician

Charles W. Walton (November 13, 1875 – March 19, 1945) was an American lawyer and politician from New York.

== Life ==
He was the son of James Walton and Ida (Terwilliger) Walton. He attended Kingston Academy. Then he studied law, was admitted to the bar in 1897, and practiced in Kingston, New York.

Walton was a member of the New York State Senate from 1915 to 1922, sitting in the 138th, 139th, 140th, 141st (all four 27th D.), 142nd, 143rd, 144th and 145th New York State Legislatures (all four 29th D.).

During the 1930s, he was Secretary of the New York State Bar Association.

He died in Kingston on March 19, 1945, after an illness of several weeks.

New York State Senate
Preceded by Abraham J. Palmer	New York State Senate; 27th District; 1915–1918	Succeeded by Caleb H. Baumes
Preceded by George B. Wellington	New York State Senate; 29th District; 1919–1922	Succeeded by Arthur F. Bouton
