= Josiah T. Newcomb =

American politician (1868–1944)

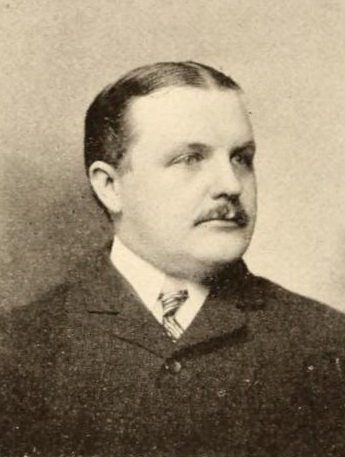
Josiah T. Newcomb (1902)

Josiah Turner Newcomb (June 19, 1868 – January 3, 1944) was an American lawyer and politician from New York.

== Life ==
He was born on June 19, 1868, in Owosso, Shiawassee County, Michigan, the son of Henry Martyn Newcomb and Lucia (Turner) Newcomb. He attended the public high school in Washington, D.C.; and graduated from Williams College in 1892. Then he became a newspaper editor and worked for the New York Evening Post. He also studied law, was admitted to the bar in 1902, and practiced in New York City.

Newcomb was a member of the New York State Assembly (New York Co., 23rd D.) in 1902 and 1904.

He was a member of the New York State Senate (19th D.) from 1909 to 1912, sitting in the 132nd, 133rd, 134th and 135th New York State Legislatures.

At the Republican primary for the New York state election, 1914, he supported Harvey D. Hinman for governor and, after Hinman's defeat, supported the Progressive ticket. In 1917, he managed Mayor John Purroy Mitchel's failed campaign for re-election.

From 1917 to 1927, he was Special Counsel to the Electric Bond and Share Company.

From 1927 to 1932 he was counsel to the National Utility Association.

He moved to LaGrangeville, in Dutchess County, and engaged in farming.

He died on January 3, 1944, at Vassar Hospital in Poughkeepsie, New York.

== Sources ==
New York State Assembly
Preceded by William H. Smith	New York State Assembly; New York County, 23rd District; 1902	Succeeded by Eugene J. McCarthy
Preceded by Eugene J. McCarthy	New York State Assembly; New York County, 23rd District; 1904	Succeeded by Richard H. Smith
New York State Senate
Preceded by Alfred R. Page	New York State Senate; 19th District; 1909–1912	Succeeded by Henry Salant
