= Horace B. Warner =

American politician (1876–1915)

Horace Byron Warner (March 24, 1876 – October 21, 1915) was an American lawyer and politician from New York who was elected to the New York State Assembly in 1913 as a member of the Progressive Party.

== Life ==
He was born on March 24, 1876, in Penfield, Monroe County, New York, the son of Henry Warner and Maria Lucy (Strowger) Warner. He graduated B.A. from Yale College in 1899. He studied law in the office of John Van Voorhis. Warner was the Justice of the Peace for the Town of Penfield from 1903 to 1906. He was admitted to the bar in 1905, and opened a law office in Rochester in 1907.

In November 1913, he was elected as a Progressive to the New York State Assembly (Monroe Co., 1st D.), and was a member of the 137th New York State Legislature in 1914. In November 1914, he ran for re-election, but was defeated by Republican James A. Harris. Harris polled 4,889 votes, and Warner polled 3,302.

Warner died unmarried on October 21, 1915, in Rochester, New York, of septic poisoning; and was buried at the Oakwood Cemetery in Penfield.

New York State Assembly
Preceded by Jared W. Hopkins	New York State Assembly; Monroe County, 1st District; 1914	Succeeded by James A. Harris
