= David Chester Lewis =

American lawyer and politician (1884–1975)

Judge of the Municipal Court, New York City
- Incumbent
- Assumed office 1927

Personal details
- Born: September 8, 1884 New York City, New York
- Died: April 5, 1975 (aged 90) Upper Montclair, New Jersey
- Party: Democratic
- Spouse: Jeannie Cowen
- Children: 3
- Education: New York Law School
- Occupation: Lawyer, Judge, Politician

David Chester Lewis (September 8, 1884 – April 5, 1975) was a Jewish-American lawyer, politician, and judge from New York.

== Life ==
Lewis was born on September 8, 1884 in New York City, New York, the son of Hill C. Lewis and Rose Baumgarten.

Lewis attended Public School No. 39, DeWitt Clinton High School, and the New York Law School. He graduated from the latter school with honors in 1906, and was admitted to the bar that year. He was also a volunteer instructor for the Civil Service School of the Marcy Association, which gave free instruction to all men in the district to prepare for civil service examination, and an editorial writer for the Manhattan and Bronx Advocate, which was edited by the blind poet Edward Doyle. He took up matters with the Public Service Commission and other departments on different occasions with regards to improving local conditions.

In 1911, Lewis unsuccessfully ran for the New York State Assembly as a Democrat in the New York County 23rd District, losing the election to Republican Sidney C. Crane. He won an election to the Assembly over Crane in 1912 and served in the Assembly in 1913. He lost the 1913 re-election to the Assembly to Crane. In 1927, he was elected to the Municipal Court as a Democrat. He wasn't renominated by the Democratic Party in 1937, and while he ran independently with support from a number of civic groups he lost the election. He briefly served on the Domestic Relations bench after being appointed to that court by Mayor Fiorello La Guardia. He then taught ethics at New York Law School, and continued to practice law until the age of 90.

Lewis was a secretary of the Marcy Association, Regent of the Benevolent Council of the Royal Arcanum, and a member of the Young Folks' Auxiliary of Lebanon Hospital and the Clinton Club. In 1924, he married Jeannie Cowen. His children were Hope Shapiro, Rosalee Mallison, and Roger. He was also on the board of the Young Men's and Young Women's Hebrew Association of Washington Heights and Inwood.

Lewis died in his daughter Hope's home in Upper Montclair, New Jersey on April 5, 1975.

New York State Assembly
Preceded by Sidney C. Crane	New York State Assembly; New York County, 23rd District; 1913	Succeeded by Sidney C. Crane
