= Michael J. Callahan (New York politician) =

American saloonkeeper and politician (1858–1902)

Michael J. Callahan (1858 – December 9, 1902) was an American saloonkeeper and politician from New York.

== Life ==
Callahan was born in 1858 in New York City, New York. He attended public school there.

Callahan initially worked as a newsboy, then as a bartender. He later became a special policeman in Koster & Bial's Music Hall on 23rd Street, where he distinguished himself as a pugilist and became known as the "Bootsy," the music hall's bouncer. In 1885, he purchased a saloon on Park Row near Chambers Street. He purchased two more shortly afterwards, one on Chatham Square (which became famous as a Chinatown resort) and one on Elm Street across the street from the then-new Criminal Courts building.

In 1893, Callahan was elected to the New York State Assembly as a Democrat, representing the New York County 2nd District. He served in the Assembly in 1894, during which time he presented a bill to prevent the quick burial of people suspected to have been poisoned and a bill related to property on 120th Street. He declared he'd never follow the Raines law and would keep his saloons open on Sunday. Theodore Roosevelt, at the time New York City Police Commissioner, had him arrested over it, although the indictment was dismissed when it came to trial.

Callahan had a wife who committed suicide in 1901. They had no children. His brother was Captain Daniel Callahan of the New York City Fire Department.

Callahan died at his home shortly after dinner on December 9, 1902.

New York State Assembly
Preceded by Timothy Sullivan	New York State Assembly; New York County, 2nd District; 1894	Succeeded by Thomas J. Barry
