= Alden Hart =

American businessman and politician

Alden Hart (March 1, 1860 – September 25, 1947) was an American businessman and politician from New York.

== Life ==
Hart was born on March 1, 1860, in Albany County, New York. He initially worked in husbandry for his father's farm. When he was 23, he moved to Salem and spent the next five years working for the Delaware and Hudson Railroad Co. In 1886, he moved to Gloversville, where he opened a grocery store with his nephew called Hart & Williams.

In 1895, Hart was elected town supervisor for the Gloversville Second ward, and served in that office for six consecutive terms. In 1910, he was elected to the New York State Assembly as a Republican, representing Fulton and Hamilton Counties. He served in the Assembly in 1911 and 1912.

After retiring from the grocery business in 1915, Hart began working as treasurer for The Morning Herald and was involved in the advertising department. He left the newspaper in 1929. He conducted an insurance business for a few years. He was also a charter member of the board of directors of the Trust Company of Fulton County.

In 1882, Hart married Ada Sharp. They had one daughter, Viola. He was the last surviving charter member of the St. James Lutheran church and served as an official of the church. He was a member of the Knights of Pythias.

Hart died at Nathan Littauer Hospital on September 25, 1947. He was buried in Prospect Hill cemetery.

New York State Assembly
| Preceded by Edward Vosburgh | New York State Assembly; Fulton and Hamilton Counties; 1911-1912 | Succeeded by James H. Wood |
