= Charles W. Wicks =

American businessman and politician

Member of the New York State Assembly from the 36th district
- In office January 1, 1915 – December 31, 1918
- Preceded by: William D. Peckham
- Succeeded by: Frederick M. Davenport

Personal details
- Born: Charles Wells Wicks; December 16, 1862 Paris Hill, New York, U.S.
- Died: August 25, 1931 (aged 68) Kennebunkport, Maine, U.S.
- Party: Republican
- Spouse: Lucie Canterbury Glenn (m. 1892)
- Children: 2
- Occupation: Politician, businessman

Charles Wells Wicks (December 16, 1862 – August 25, 1931) was an American businessman and politician from New York.

== Life ==
Born in Paris Hill, Oneida County, New York, he was the son of Charles Chidsey Wicks (1811–1884) and Nancy Bicknell (Dickinson) Wicks (1829–1904). He attended the local Paris Hill school and Sauquoit Academy. Then he became a wholesale grocer's clerk, and later an employee of Roberts, Butler & Co., clothes manufacturers in Utica. Upon the death of Roberts, Wicks became a partner in the company. On May 5, 1892, he married Lucie Canterbury Glenn, and they had two sons. He sold his part in 1904, and entered the clothes retail business instead. In 1909, he sold out, and retired from active business. He became a stockholder and director of several companies, and engaged in farming.

Wicks was a member of the New York State Senate (36th D.) from 1915 to 1918, sitting in the 138th, 139th, 140th and 141st New York State Legislatures.

Wicks moved to Kennebunkport, Maine in 1928, where he died three years later.

== Sources ==
- New York Red Book (1917; pg. 131)
- Bio transcribed from History of Oneida County, New York by Henry J. Cookinham (1912)

New York State Senate
Preceded by William D. Peckham	New York State Senate; 36th District; 1915–1918	Succeeded by Frederick M. Davenport
