= Andrew F. Murray =

American lawyer and politician (1877–1932)

Andrew F. Murray (March 24, 1877 – December 1932) was an American lawyer and politician from New York.

== Early life and education ==
He was born on March 24, 1877, in New York City. He graduated from the College of the City of New York and the New York University School of Law.

== Career ==
Murray entered politics as a Republican, and was a member of the New York State Assembly (New York Co., 19th D.) in 1909, 1910, 1911 and 1912.

In November 1913, Murray was elected on the Progressive and Independence League tickets to the Assembly, defeating the incumbent Democrat Thomas F. Denney. Murray polled 4,857 votes, Denney polled 4,354 votes, and Republican Charles H. Wilson polled 3,935. Murray was a member of the 137th New York State Legislature in 1914.

== Death ==
He died in December 1932.

New York State Assembly
Preceded by William B. Donihee	New York State Assembly; New York County, 19th District; 1909–1912	Succeeded by Thomas F. Denney
Preceded by Thomas F. Denney	New York State Assembly; New York County, 19th District; 1914	Succeeded by Patrick F. Cotter
