= Thomas F. Denney =

American politician

Thomas F. Denney (September 20, 1874 – November 26, 1913) was an American politician from New York.

== Life ==
Denney was born on September 20, 1874, in New York City, New York, the son of Scottish immigrant John Denney and Irish immigrant Delia Gannan.

Denney worked in the hotel and restaurant business for twenty years in connection with controlling or checking systems, and one source considered him an expert in that field of hotel work. He was actively associated with the Monongahela Democratic Club and the General Committee of the Nineteenth Assembly District. In 1912, he was elected to the New York State Assembly as a Democrat, representing the New York County 19th District. He served in the Assembly in 1913. He lost the 1913 re-election to Progressive candidate Andrew F. Murray.

Denney died in a car collision that also killed three other people and injured five more on the Pelham Parkway, close to the Knickerbocker Inn, on November 26, 1913. He never married. He was buried in Calvary Cemetery.

New York State Assembly
Preceded by Andrew F. Murray	New York State Assembly; New York County, 19th District; 1913	Succeeded by Andrew F. Murray
