= Timothy Sullivan =

American politician (1862–1913)

Timothy D. Sullivan
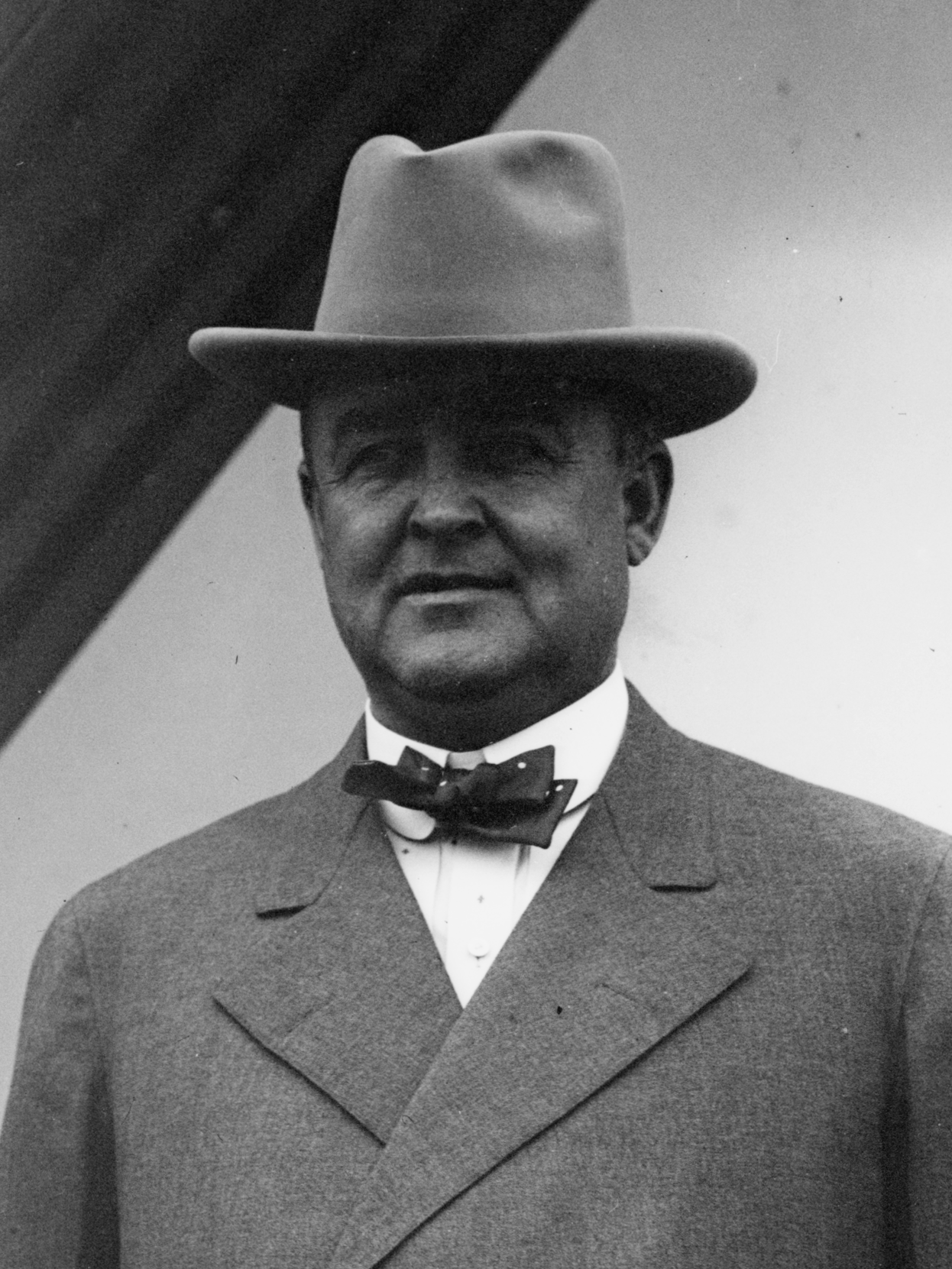

Member of the U.S. House of Representatives from New York
- In office March 4, 1903 – July 27, 1906
- Preceded by: Thomas J. Creamer
- Succeeded by: Daniel J. Riordan
- Constituency: 8th district
- In office March 4, 1913 – August 31, 1913
- Preceded by: Jefferson M. Levy
- Succeeded by: George W. Loft
- Constituency: 13th district

Member of the New York Senate
- In office January 1, 1894 – December 31, 1902
- Preceded by: Thomas F. Cunningham
- Succeeded by: John C. Fitzgerald
- Constituency: 9th district (1894–95); 11th district (1896–1902)
- In office January 1, 1909 – December 31, 1912
- Preceded by: William Sohmer
- Succeeded by: John C. Fitzgerald
- Constituency: 12th district

Member of the New York State Assembly from the 2nd New York County district
- In office January 1, 1887 – December 31, 1893
- Preceded by: Thomas Maher
- Succeeded by: Michael J. Callahan

Personal details
- Born: Timothy Daniel Sullivan; July 23, 1862 Manhattan, New York, U.S.
- Died: August 31, 1913 (aged 51) Bronx, New York, U.S.
- Resting place: Calvary Cemetery, Queens, New York
- Party: Democratic

Timothy Daniel Sullivan (July 23, 1862 – August 31, 1913) was a New York politician who controlled Manhattan's Bowery and Lower East Side districts as a prominent leader within Tammany Hall. He was known euphemistically as "Dry Dollar", as the "Big Feller", and later as "Big Tim" because of his physical stature. He amassed a large fortune as a businessman running vaudeville and legitimate theaters, as well as nickelodeons, race tracks, and athletic clubs.

Sullivan in 1911 pushed through the legislature the Sullivan Act, an early gun control measure. He was a strong supporter of organized labor and women's suffrage. The newspapers depicted Big Tim as the spider in the center of the web, mentioning his criminal activities and his control over gambling in the city. Welch says that "assigning the role of vice lord to Sullivan gave Tammany's enemies a weapon to be wielded in every municipal election between 1886 and 1912".

== Personal life ==
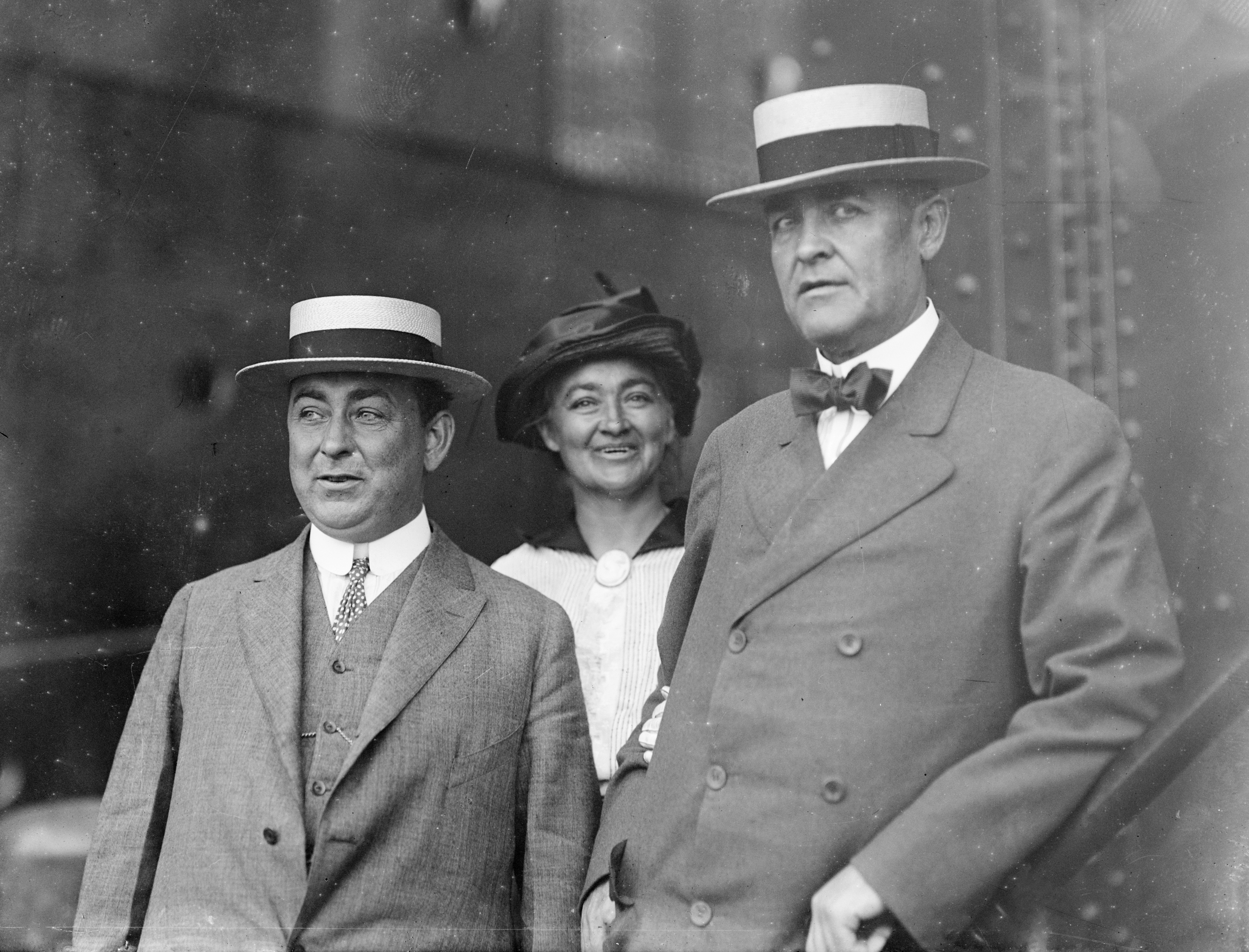
Larry Mulligan and Tim Sullivan (right)

He was born in the slum of Five Points to Daniel O. Sullivan, who emigrated from County Kerry, Ireland, and his wife, Catherine Connelly (or Conley), from Kenmare, County Kerry. His father, a Union veteran of the American Civil War, died of typhus in October 1867 at age thirty-six, leaving his wife to care for their four children. Three years later, Catherine Sullivan married an alcoholic laborer of Irish descent named Lawrence Mulligan and had six children by him.

At age eight, Sullivan began shining shoes and selling newspapers on Park Row in lower Manhattan. By his mid twenties, he was the part or full owner of six saloons, which was the career of choice for aspiring politicians. Sullivan attracted the attention of local politicians, notably Thomas "Fatty" Walsh, a prominent Tammany Hall ward leader and father of stage actress Blanche Walsh.

In 1886, Sullivan married Helen Fitzgerald. He gradually began building one of the most powerful political machines, which controlled virtually all jobs and vice below 14th Street in Manhattan. His base was his headquarters at 207 Bowery. By 1892, Tammany Hall leader Richard Croker appointed Sullivan leader of his assembly district of the Lower East Side.

In May 1910, Sullivan sailed to England on a boat with many social luminaries among his fellow passengers. One of them, Alice Roosevelt Longworth, wrote years later in her autobiography about Sullivan, calling him "a tall, well-set-up, smooth-shaven Irishman, who talked a blue streak in the voice and phraseology of the New York-Irish of the East Side...." In her judgment years later, Sullivan was "as straight and well-intentioned and genuinely sympathetic in his personal relations and humanitarian enterprises, as he was callous and corrupt politically."

== Political career ==
Sullivan was a member of the New York State Assembly (New York Co., 2nd D.) in 1887, 1888, 1889, 1890, 1891, 1892 and 1893.

He was a member of the New York State Senate from 1894 to 1902, sitting in the 117th, 118th (both 9th D.), 119th, 120th, 121st, 122nd, 123rd, 124th and 125th New York State Legislatures (all seven 11th D.).

He was elected as a Democrat to the 58th and 59th United States Congresses, holding office from March 4, 1903, until his resignation on July 27, 1906. According to some accounts, Sullivan's resignation was prompted by the graft and anonymity of Washington political life. He was quoted as saying, "There's nothing in this Congressman business. They know 'em in Washington. The people down there use 'em as hitchin'-posts. Every time they see a Congressman on the streets they tie their horses to him."

He was again a member of the State Senate (12th D.) from 1909 to 1912, sitting in the 132nd, 133rd, 134th and 135th New York State Legislatures. In November 1912, he was elected to the 63rd United States Congress but, due to ill health, did not take his seat, and died a few months into his term.

It could be said that Sullivan was one of the earliest political reformers, since he was aligned with women's rights activist Frances Perkins and sponsored legislation limiting the maximum number of hours women were forced to work, improving the conditions of stable and delivery horses and the Sullivan Law, city gun-control legislation.

== Rise to power in Tammany Hall ==
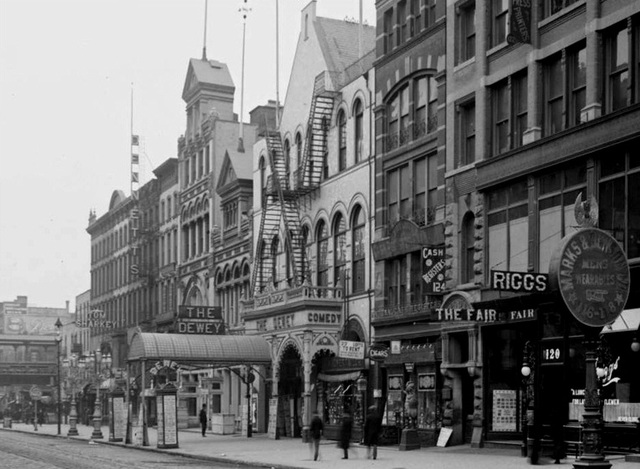
Dewey Theatre, owned by Timothy D. Sullivan and George Krause and leased to William Fox, who used the venue for vaudeville. Attendance averaged 9,000 patrons a day.

Along with his political and criminal activities, Sullivan was a successful businessman involved in real estate, theatrical ventures (at one point partnering with Marcus Loew), boxing and horseracing.

Along with various other Sullivans, Big Tim also branched out into popular amusement venues such as Dreamland in Coney Island, where he installed a distant relative, Dennis, as the political leader. Sullivan, whose control extended to illegal prizefights through the National Athletic Club, influenced the New York State Legislature to legalize boxing in 1896 before ring deaths and other scandals caused the law's repeal four years later.

Among other laws he helped pass was the Sullivan Act, a state law that required a permit to carry or own a concealed weapon, which eventually became law on May 29, 1911. Upon first passage, the Sullivan Act required licenses for New Yorkers to possess firearms small enough to be concealed. Possession of such firearms without a license was a misdemeanor, and carrying them was a felony. However, with many residents unable to afford the $3 registration fee issued by the corrupt New York Police Department, his bodyguards could be legally armed while using the law against their political opponents.

He was extremely popular among his constituents. In the hot summer months, tenement dwellers were feted to steamboat excursions and picnics to College Point in Queens or New Jersey. In the winter months, the Sullivan machine doled out food, coal and clothing to his constituents. On the anniversary of his mother's birthday, February 6, Sullivan dispensed shoes to needy tenement dwellers. The annual Christmas Dinners were a particularly notable event covered in all of the city papers. Although he had a loyal following, his involvement in organized crime and political protection of street gangs and vice districts remained a source of controversy throughout his career.

== Electoral fraud ==
Sullivan was an expert in using electoral fraud to retain his power. In a quid pro quo arrangement, constituents voted the way that they were instructed. In return, they were the recipients of Tammany largesse which included coal in the winter, clambakes and outings in the summer, jobs on the city payroll and all-around assistance. In 1892 when his pct went 395 to 4 for Grover Cleveland over Benjamin Harrison in the presidential election he said, "Harrison got one...more vote than I expected, but I'll find that feller!" His most common tactic, with no voter ID, was to use "repeaters." Here's how he described it, "When you've voted'em with their whiskers on you take'em to a barber and scrap off the chin-fringe. Then you vote'em again with side lilacs and a mustache. Then to a barber again, off comes the sides and you vote'em a third time with the mustache. If that ain't enough, and the box can stand a few more ballots, clean off the mustache and vote'em plain face. That makes every one of 'em good for four votes." (Rothstein by David Pietrusza. Pgs 53–55.)

== Involvement in criminal activity ==
During the turn of the century, he developed contacts with many influential figures, including Monk Eastman, Paul Kelly, Arnold Rothstein and disgraced NYPD Lieutenant Charles Becker, who was able to obtain for the latter a high-ranking position on the New York police force in 1893.

A close associate of Charles Francis Murphy, who succeeded the exiled Richard Croker as head of Tammany Hall in May 1902, the two forced corrupt police chief William Stephen Devery out of Tammany's Executive Committee as part of Murphy's campaign to eliminate any direct links between vice districts and Tammany Hall.

However, Sullivan was allowed to keep his kickbacks from the Lower East Side and Chinatown as a means of keeping him from becoming Murphy's political rival (he had used his considerable political influence from keeping Croker's reform group, the Committee of Five, out of the Bowery only two years before). In exchange, Sullivan had to furnish gang leaders Monk Eastman and Paul Kelly, amongst others, to commit election fraud on behalf of Tammany Hall.

At the time, it was widely known that Sullivan and his subordinates were active in a number of illegal activities, including prostitution, gambling and extortion. A number of these revelations came to light in the New York State Lexow Committee hearings as well as through the investigations of the Rev. Charles Henry Parkhurst.

== Later years, death and aftermath ==
Suffering from tertiary syphilis during his later years, his health continued to deteriorate until he was judged mentally incompetent and finally committed to a sanitarium in 1912. According to the Incompetency hearings, Sullivan elicited paranoid delusions, believed he was being spied upon and his food was being poisoned. On January 12, 1913, the New York Sun reported in a prominent page two article that he was mourned after being committed, "beyond cure" (without naming illness), suffering from "religious mania".

After nearly a year, he managed to escape from his brother's house after eluding nurses on the early morning of August 31 (although other accounts claim he had escaped from orderlies after an all-night card game). Within a few hours, his body was found on the tracks in the Eastchester area of the Bronx, New York.

Sullivan's family did not report him missing for more than 10 days, and his body was brought to and held at the local Fordham morgue. Finally, after a fortnight, Sullivan was classified as a vagrant and scheduled for burial in Potter's Field despite his tailored clothing and "TDS" diamond monogrammed cufflinks.

Just before removal, his body was finally recognized by Police Officer Peter Purfield, who was assigned to the morgue detail. The New York Times later speculated that Sullivan might have been killed and placed on the tracks. In fact, the engineer of the train that struck Sullivan stated that he thought the body was already deceased. And, adding to the speculation of foul play, Thomas Reigelmann, the Bronx coroner and Tammany political appointee who signed the death certificate, failed to recognize the body of his longtime friend despite the lack of trauma to the decedent's face.

Sullivan's wake was held at his clubhouse, located at 207 Bowery, and over 25,000 people turned out for his funeral at St. Patrick's Old Cathedral, New York, on Mott Street. He was interred in Calvary Cemetery, Queens, New York.

For the next seven or eight years, there was a protracted battle over Sullivan's estate, which by some estimates ranged as high as $2.5 million. After creditors were satisfied, the bulk of the assets went to Sullivan's full siblings, Patrick H. and Mary Anne, and half-brother Lawrence Mulligan. For several years after Big Tim's death, Patrick H. Sullivan attempted to maintain his late brother's political and criminal clout. However, he proved to be an ineffectual leader and withdrew from politics to pursue real estate ventures.

Sullivan had one child with his wife, Helen, a daughter who died in infancy. He did, however, father at least six illegitimate children, many with actresses affiliated with his theatrical ventures, two of whom were Christie MacDonald and Elsie Janis.

== In popular culture ==
He was portrayed by Joseph Sullivan in the 1914 silent film The Life of Big Tim Sullivan; Or, From Newsboy to Senator, one of the earlier people to be the subject of a biographical film. He was also a main character in Kevin Baker's novel Dreamland, about life in turn-of-the-century New York, set in part in the Coney Island amusement park of the same name.

On film himself, Sullivan appeared in Actors' Fund Field Day, a 1910 silent short film denoting an actors' fundraising. Sullivan more than likely knew many of the persons in the film.

A fictionalized account of some of Big Tim Sullivan's later years is featured in Dreamland (Kevin Baker), and he plays a minor role in E. L. Doctorow's novel Ragtime.

== See also ==
- List of members of the United States Congress who died in office (1900–1949)
- J. Raymond Jones

New York State Assembly
Preceded by Thomas Maher	New York State Assembly; New York County, 2nd District; 1887–1893	Succeeded by Michael J. Callahan
New York State Senate
Preceded by Thomas F. Cunningham	New York State Senate; 9th District; 1894–1895	Succeeded by Julius L. Wieman
Preceded by Joseph C. Wolff	New York State Senate; 11th District; 1896–1902	Succeeded by John C. Fitzgerald
Preceded by William Sohmer	New York State Senate; 12th District; 1909–1912	Succeeded by John C. Fitzgerald
U.S. House of Representatives
Preceded by Montague Lessler	Member of the U.S. House of Representatives from New York's 8th congressional district 1903–1906	Succeeded by Daniel J. Riordan
Preceded by Jefferson Monroe Levy	Member of the U.S. House of Representatives from New York's 13th congressional district 1913	Succeeded by George W. Loft
