= Abraham J. Palmer =

American physician, minister, and politician

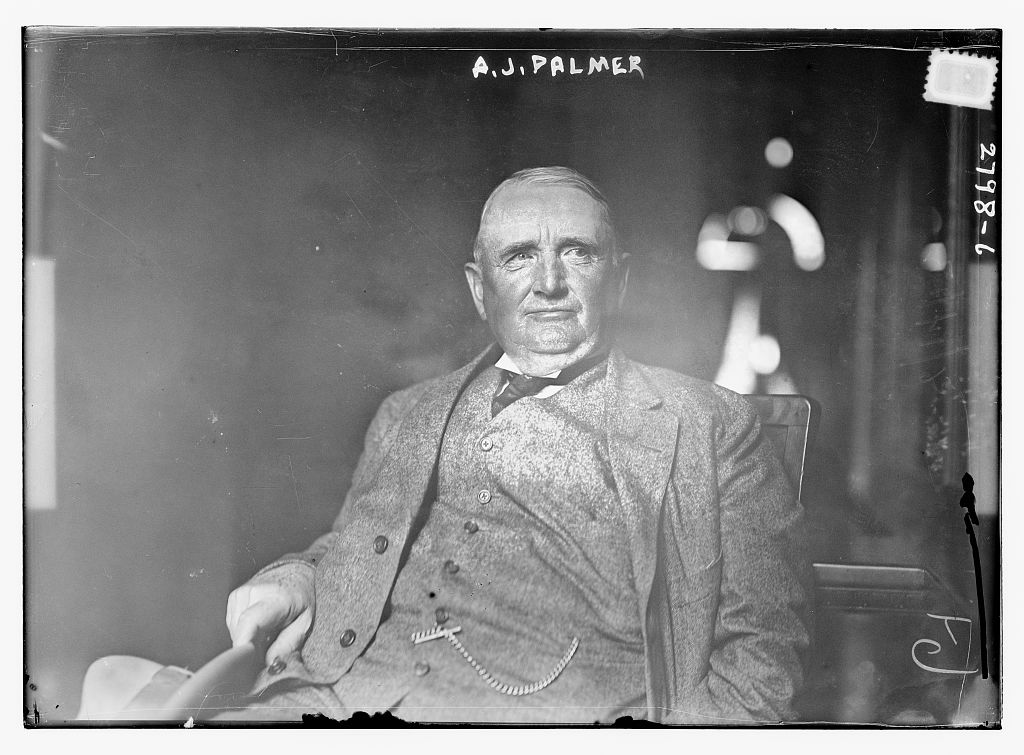
- Photograph of Palmer in either 1910 or 1915
- Born: January 18, 1847; Frenchtown, New Jersey, United States
- Died: April 17, 1922 (aged 75); New York City, New York, United States
- Occupation: New York State Senator
- Political party: Bull Moose Party
- Other political affiliations: Republican Party

Abraham John Palmer (January 18, 1847 – April 17, 1922) was an American physician, Methodist minister and politician.

== Life ==
Palmer was born in Frenchtown, New Jersey on January 18, 1847. Little is known of his childhood.

He was a teenager throughout the American Civil War. He turned 18 on January 18, 1865.

Sometime after 1866 he had moved to New York.

Palmer was elected in November 1912 as a Progressive with Republican endorsement to the New York State Senate (27th D.), and was a member of the 136th and 137th New York State Legislatures in 1913 and 1914.

In April, 1913, he introduced a bill in the New York Legislature to repeal public utility franchises of all types after a term of twenty-five years.

In February 1914, he announced that he would not vote with the Progressives anymore, after a combination of Democratic and Progressive legislators had elected Homer D. Call as State Treasurer.

He died on April 17, 1922.

New York State Senate
Preceded by William P. Fiero	New York State Senate; 27th District; 1913–1914	Succeeded by Charles W. Walton
