= John W. Gurnett =

American businessman and politician

John W. Gurnett (August 28, 1865 – December 3, 1920) was an American businessman and politician from New York.

== Life ==
Gurnett was born on August 28, 1865 in Watkins Glen, New York, the son of John Gurnett. He was a member of the clothing firm Moran & Gurnett. He also operated a store in Amsterdam and worked in road construction.

In 1904, Gurnett was elected to the New York State Assembly as a Democrat, representing Schuyler County. He served in the Assembly in 1905, 1906, 1911, 1912, and 1913. He also served as town supervisor for Dix for eight years.

In 1896, Gurnett married Katherine Green of Montour Falls. Their children were John, George, and Margaret.

Gurnett died at home on December 3, 1920. He was buried in St. Mary's Cemetery.

New York State Assembly
Preceded by Olin T. Nye	New York State Assembly; Schuyler County; 1905-1906	Succeeded by Charles A. Cole
Preceded by LaFayette W. Argetsinger	New York State Assembly; Schuyler County; 1911-1913	Succeeded by Henry S. Howard
