= Harold J. Hinman =

American politician

Harold Jay Hinman (February 22, 1877 – February 21, 1955) was an American politician from New York.

== Life ==
He was born on February 22, 1877, in Albany, New York, the son of Addison Josiah Hinman and Susan Mary DuBois (Hotaling) Hinman. He attended the public schools and Albany High School. He graduated Ph.B. from Union College in 1899, and LL.B. from Albany Law School in 1901. He was admitted to the bar, and practiced law in Albany. He married Lucy Emma Warner (1882–1857), and they had two daughters. He also entered politics as a Republican.

Hinman was a member of the New York State Assembly (Albany Co., 1st D.) in 1910, 1911, 1912, 1913, 1914 and 1915. He was Chairman of the Committee on the Judiciary in 1912; Minority Leader in 1913; and Majority Leader in 1914 and 1915. He was a delegate to the New York State Constitutional Convention of 1915.

He was a Deputy Attorney General from 1915 to 1918. In November 1918, he was elected to the New York Supreme Court. He was designated to the Appellate Division (3rd Dept.) in February 1922, and remained on the bench until the end of 1932 when his term expired.

He died on February 21, 1955, at his home at 292 State Street in Albany, New York; and was buried at the Albany Rural Cemetery in Menands.

== Sources ==
New York State Assembly
Preceded by J. Newton Fiero	New York State Assembly; Albany County, 1st District; 1910–1915	Succeeded by Clarence F. Welsh
Political offices
Preceded by Al Smith	Minority Leader in the New York State Assembly; 1913	Succeeded by Al Smith
Preceded by Aaron J. Levy	Majority Leader of the New York State Assembly; 1914–1915	Succeeded by Simon L. Adler
