= Wallace Thayer =

American politician

Wallace Thayer (October 18, 1866 – November 5, 1944) was an American lawyer and politician from New York.

== Life ==
He was born on October 18, 1866, in Buffalo, New York to Edwin Thayer, a Lawyer from Buffalo, New York and brother of William Wallace Thayer and Andrew Jackson Thayer. He graduated in 1889 from Buffalo Law School, then still affiliated with Niagara University and was awarded the Daniel's Scholarship for best thesis on constitutional law for his writings on the 14th amendment. He practiced law in Buffalo.

In November 1913, Thayer was elected as a Progressive, with Democratic endorsement, to the New York State Assembly (Erie Co., 8th D.), and was a member of the 137th New York State Legislature in 1914.

He died on November 5, 1944, in Los Angeles, California.

New York State Assembly
Preceded by George Geoghan	New York State Assembly; Erie County, 8th District; 1914	Succeeded by Leonard W. H. Gibbs
