= George W. Simpson =

American politician

George W. Simpson (December 21, 1870 in Baltimore, Maryland – August 17, 1951 in Manhattan, New York City) was an American lawyer and politician from New York.

== Life ==
The family removed to New York City shortly after George was born.

Simpson contested the election of Progressive Henry Salant to the New York State Senate (19th D.), and was seated on April 29, 1913, in the 136th New York State Legislature. He remained in the State Senate until 1916, sitting in the 137th, 138th and 139th New York State Legislatures.

He was a City Magistrate from 1918 to 1931 when he resigned from the bench.

He died on August 17, 1951, at his home at 425 West 57th Street in Manhattan.

== Sources ==
- SURPLUS OF MAGISTRATES in NYT on March 31, 1918
- HYLAN REPLACES TIERNAN AS JUDGE IN ECKERT INQUIRY in NYT on August 28, 1920
- SIMPSON QUITS BENCH AS HE FACES INQUIRY in NYT on January 17, 1931 (subscription required)
- GEORGE W. SIMPSON, ONCE MAGISTRATE, 81 in NYT on August 18, 1951 (subscription required)

New York State Senate
Preceded by Henry Salant	New York State Senate; 19th District; 1913–1916	Succeeded by Edward J. Dowling
