= Baumes law =

Anti-crime statute

The Baumes law was an anti-crime statute adopted by New York State in 1926.

== Description ==
The laws are two amendments (Chap. 457, Laws 1926, sections 1941 & 1943) to the Laws of New York.

Written by and named after Senator Caleb H. Baumes, the chairman of the New York State Crime Commission, the sections called for the automatic life imprisonment of any criminal convicted of more than three separate felonies, without regard to the nature of the offense or any attendant circumstances. It also permitted longer sentences for first-time offenders, denied parole to inmates who had used firearms in the commission of their crimes, and mandated that prisoners could not begin receiving credit for good behavior for parole purposes until they had served the minimum sentence for their offense. By 1930, twenty-three states had adopted similar standards, all of which were commonly referred to as "Baumes laws".

The law was made possible by the growing adoption and acceptance of fingerprinting as a method of identification by police departments, which began to replace anthropometry as the technique of choice in the 1920s. Law enforcement officials felt that the new methods enabled them to more efficiently and reliably distinguish recalcitrant criminals from reformed ones. By 1931, two hundred four-time offenders in New York had been given life sentences under the Baumes law.

== Legal challenges ==
A serious challenge to the Baumes law concerned the case of a shoplifter named Ruth St. Clair, who was arrested for the fourth time after stealing items from a department store in December 1929. St. Clair had three prior convictions of a similar nature in 1920, 1924, and 1926, for stealing items such as coats and dresses from stores. When she was convicted of the 1929 offense, the Baumes law imposed a life sentence, the first given to a woman since its enactment. St. Clair's case attracted much media attention, but the United States Supreme Court upheld her sentence in 1930. St. Clair eventually spent eight years in prison, before her sentence was commuted to time served.

== Effects of the Baumes law ==
While the Baumes law seemed to remove authority from judges and parole boards by mandating sentences, they gradually began to work around it through the increased use of plea bargains. In cases where a life sentence would have been unjust, prosecutors became more amenable to accused parties' guilty pleas to misdemeanor charges, which would not trigger portions of the statute.

The Baumes law increased prison populations as persons who would formerly have been paroled remained incarcerated, placing a strain on infrastructure. In addition to a negative effect on prison conditions, the Baumes law also decreased prisoner morale, since it greatly decreased inmates' ability to achieve parole. Commenting on the Baumes law in his autobiography, Clarence Darrow wrote,

The unfortunates in prisons felt that there was no chance for regaining liberty once the prison doors closed upon them. This hopelessness kindled prison revolts, which led to fearful slaughter, to the destruction of all that the years of earnest work had done to modify conditions by building up humane prisons, caring for juvenile offenders, and giving the condemned hope or opportunity once more to be free.

The Baumes law led to 1929 riots at Auburn and Dannemora, with nine prisoners and a guard losing their lives during the former.

In response to the riots, New York appointed a committee to investigate the state's prison system. Led by Sam Lewisohn, who would ultimately become the president of the American Prison Association, the Lewisohn Commission issued a number of recommended changes, the majority of which became policy. Among these was a shift from the mandatory sentences of the Baumes law to a more open-ended sentencing and parole system, focused on rehabilitation and vocational training.

== "Bum's rush" ==
Some people mistakenly believe that a corrupted version of "Baumes law" was the origin for the idiom "bum's rush". However, this phrase was in common use before the passage of the Baumes law, and it is derived from the practice of evicting tramps or vagrants from bars and other public places. Dashiell Hammett's 1929 novel The Maltese Falcon has a bit of dialogue referring to "Baumes rush" in reference to a hoodlum who had left New York for San Francisco, the implication being that he had been chased out by the police, so perhaps the "Baumes" variant was back-fit to the existing one given the assonance of the name.

== See also ==
- Three strikes law
