= Edward Vosburgh =

American politician

Edward Vosburgh (November 18, 1864 – September 24, 1930) was an American businessman and politician from New York.

== Life ==
Vosburgh was born on November 18, 1864, in Johnstown, New York, the son of Henry J. Vosburgh and Charlotte Putnam.

In 1885, Vosburgh moved to Vail Mills, where he opened a general store with David B. Hall. He bought Hall's interest a year later and continued running the store. He later sold it to C. D. Stewart of Gloversville, at which point he moved with his family to Broadalbin. He served as Vail Mills postmaster from 1886 to 1909, with an interruption from 1896 to 1900 when a Democratic administration appointed someone else instead. He was also a member of the Trust Company of Fulton County for many years.

Vosburgh was town supervisor for Mayfield from 1898 to 1900. In 1909, Vosburgh was elected to the New York State Assembly as a Republican, representing Fulton and Hamilton Counties. He served in the Assembly in 1910. During World War I, Governor Charles Seymour Whitman appointed him a member of the local exemption board for the second district of Fulton County.

In 1886, Vosburgh married Jennie Atty. Their son, Ralph E., helped his father manage the store and became postmaster of Vail Mills. He was a member of the Methodist Episcopal church. He was a Freemason.

Vosburgh died in Amsterdam City Hospital on September 24, 1930. He was buried in Broadalbin cemetery.

New York State Assembly
Preceded by Scott Partridge	New York State Assembly; Fulton and Hamilton Counties; 1910	Succeeded by Alden Hart
