= M. Maldwin Fertig =

American politician

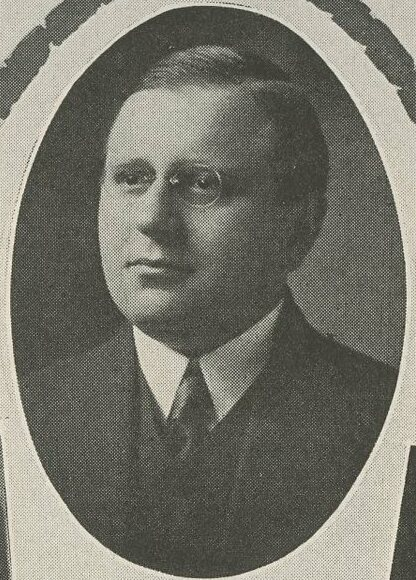
Moses Maldwin Fertig

Moses Maldwin Fertig (July 10, 1887 – July 23, 1972) was an American lawyer and politician from New York.

== Life ==
Fertig was born on July 10, 1887, in New York City, New York, the son of Joseph Fertig and Celia Siegel. His father was an Austrian immigrant from Lemberg. His brother was New York economist, author, and columnist Lawrence Fertig.

Fertig graduated from the College of the City of New York with a B.Sc. in 1907. He then taught in Public School No. 29 in the Bronx while doing post-graduate studies at New York University. He graduated from New York Law School with an LL.B. in 1910. He was then admitted to the bar and practiced law, with an office at 64 Wall Street in New York City.

In 1914, Fertig was elected to the New York State Assembly as a Democrat, representing the New York City 34th District in Bronx County. He served in the Assembly in 1915, 1916 (having been elected as a Democrat and a Progressive), 1917 (having been elected as a Democrat, Progressive, and Independence League), and 1919 (having been elected as a Democrat and Republican). By 1919, he was practicing law in 120 Broadway and was a member of the law firm Walter, Wolff & Fertig.

Fertig was the first to call for an inquiry in the state's housing problems in 1919, resulting in his appointment to the Lockwood Housing Committee. He introduced the first bill in the State Legislature to exempt newly-constructed residential buildings from taxation. He introduced and successfully passed the Lockwood-Fertig Bill, which provided equal pay for New York City school teachers. He also successfully passed a bill that enlarged New York City College. He sponsored a Minimum Wage Bill and an Eight Hour Law. While in the Assembly, he was commended by the American Federation of Labor for his stance on labor issues.

Fertig served as assistant corporation counsel of New York City from 1920 to 1932, in charge of franchise division. He conducted the city's long litigation in opposition to increased telephone rates, handled gas, electric, telephone, transit, and regulatory matters, and was the city's counsel in New York Central Railroad Commutation Case. He served as counsel to Governor Franklin D. Roosevelt in 1932 and to Governor Herbert H. Lehman in 1933. He was a special counsel for the Public Service Commission in 1936, arguing for and obtaining a decision that sustained the constitutionality of Lehman's temporary rate legislation in the Court of Appeals.

In 1933, Fertig became senior partner of the law firm Fertig, Walter & Gottesman with Alfred A. Walter and Samuel Gottesman. An expert in public utility law and practice, he became a member of the New York State Transit Commission he in 1938. He was a member of the New York State Constitutional Convention of 1938. In the Convention, he successfully sponsored the Fertig Amendment, which authorized a 315 million dollar exemption from New York City's statutory debt limit to be used so the city could buy ownership of the Interboro Rapid Transit and the Brooklyn-Manhattan Transit systems. Later, he was a negotiator who helped fix the amounts to be paid for the properties. He ultimately became a key figure in unifying the New York City Subway system. He unsuccessfully ran for President of the New York City Council in 1933 and 1941, and in 1952 he unsuccessfully ran for Bronx Surrogate.

Active in Jewish religious and communal affairs, Fertig was president of the Bronx YMHA and YWHA from 1914 to 1939, president of the New York section of the Jewish Welfare Board from 1930 to 1938, a trustee of the Federation for the Support of Jewish Philanthropic Societies, and a member of the governing council of the American Jewish Congress. He was a member of the New York County Lawyers' Association, the Bronx County Bar Association, the Academy of Political Science, the advisory committee of the New York section of the National Youth Administration, B'nai B'rith, and the Freemasons. He was also vice-president of the Metropolitan League of Jewish Community Associations. He attended Congregation Kehilath Israel. In 1920, he married Mathilda Wohl.

Fertig died at home on July 23, 1972.

New York State Assembly
Preceded by Otto Henschel	New York State Assembly; New York County, 34th District; 1915–1917	Succeeded by District Abolished
Preceded by Samuel Orr	New York State Assembly; Bronx County, 4th District; 1919	Succeeded by Samuel Orr
