= William L. Ormrod =

American politician (1863–1921)

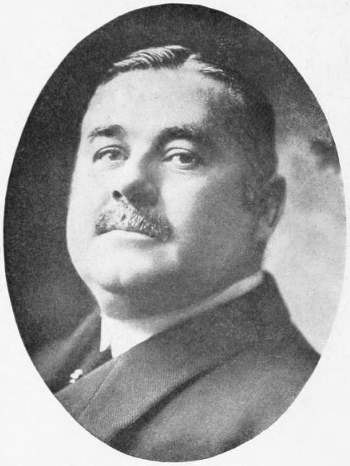

Member of the New York State Senate
- In office 1911–1914

Personal details
- Born: William Laurence Ormrod; September 8, 1863 Cleveland, Ohio, US
- Died: September 3, 1921 (aged 57) Churchville, New York, US
- Resting place: Mount Hope Cemetery
- Party: Republican
- Spouse: Harriet E. Brooks (m. 1899)
- Occupation: Businessman, farmer, politician

William Laurence Ormrod (September 8, 1863 – September 3, 1921) was an American businessman, farmer and politician from New York.

== Life ==
William L. Ormrod was born in Cleveland, Ohio on September 8, 1863, the son of William Ormrod and Catherine Ormrod. He attended the public schools and business college in Cleveland. He then worked as a hotel telegraph operator, a hotel clerk, and eventually a hotel manager. For about ten years, he managed the Hotel Royal in New Orleans during the winter season, and the Clifton House in Niagara Falls, New York, during the summer season. Then he became a partner in the Monmouth House in Spring Lake, New Jersey, then the largest beach resort on the Atlantic coast.

On October 23, 1899, he married Harriet E. Brooks, retired from the hotel business, went to live in Rochester, New York. In 1905 he bought a large estate in nearby Churchville, New York, his wife's home village. There he became a large stockholder in the Flour City National Bank; engaged in the construction of infrastructure, like telephone, electricity, roads and bridges; and also engaged in farming on his 200-acres estate. He was the town supervisor of the Town of Riga, New York, in 1905.

Ormrod was a member of the New York State Senate (46th D.) from 1911 to 1914, sitting in the 134th, 135th, 136th and 137th New York State Legislatures.

He died on September 3, 1921, at his home near Churchville, New York, and was buried at the Mount Hope Cemetery in Rochester.

New York State Senate
Preceded by Charles J. White	New York State Senate; 46th District; 1911–1914	Succeeded by John B. Mullan
