= James F. Duhamel =

American politician (1858–1947)

James Francis Duhamel (August 5, 1858 – October 27, 1947) was an American lawyer and politician from New York.

== Life ==
Duhamel, born in Washington, D.C., was the son of Dr. W. J. C. DuHamel, a surgeon who served on the White House staff of Presidents James Buchanan and Andrew Johnson.

Duhamel attended St. Matthew's Institute, and St. John's College, in Washington, D.C. He became a patent attorney, and during the 1890s removed to Brooklyn.

He was a member of the New York State Senate (8th D.) from 1911 to 1914, sitting in the 134th, 135th, 136th and 137th New York State Legislatures. Originally elected as an Independence Leaguer with Democratic endorsement, he later joined the Democratic Party, and in 1914 Ex-Governor Sulzer's American Party. In 1916, he supported Samuel Seabury for Governor.

Later he returned to Washington, D.C., and continued his patent practice there.

He died on October 27, 1947, in the John Dickson Home at 5000 Fourteenth Street N.W. in Washington, D.C.; and was buried at the Mount Olivet Cemetery there.

== Sources ==
- Official New York from Cleveland to Hughes by Charles Elliott Fitch (Hurd Publishing Co., New York and Buffalo, 1911, Vol. IV; pg. 367)
- "UP FOR CONGRESS AND STATE SENATE" in The New York Times on August 23, 1912
- "MORE HONORS FOR WHITMAN" in The New York Times on December 19, 1914
- "SEABURY LEAGUE ACTIVE" in The New York Times on July 2, 1916
- "James F. Duhamel" in Records of the Columbia Historical Society, Washington, D.C. (1946, pg. 343)

New York State Senate
Preceded by Alvah W. Burlingame Jr.	New York State Senate; 8th District; 1911–1914	Succeeded by Alvah W. Burlingame Jr.
