= Maurice Bloch (politician) =

American lawyer and politician

Maurice Bloch (April 26, 1891 in New York City – December 5, 1929 in Manhattan, New York City) was an American lawyer and politician from New York.

== Personal life ==
Bloch married Madeline Neuberger (1894–1986) in 1922. Robert F. Wagner Sr., then a judge, acted as best man. Bloch and his wife had two children, a daughter, Jean Doris, and a son named Robert Wagner Bloch. At the time, Bloch was President of the Park Avenue Synagogue, where a plaque honors him.

== Sources ==
- MAURICE BLOCH A FATHER in NYT on March 5, 1925 (subscription required)
- MAURICE BLOCH DIES AFTER AN OPERATION in NYT on December 6, 1929 (subscription required)
- Obituaries; Madeline N. Bloch in NYT on November 18, 1986

New York State Assembly
Preceded by Benjamin E. Moore	New York State Assembly; New York County, 22nd District; 1915–1917	Succeeded by Earl A. Smith
Preceded by Martin G. McCue	New York State Assembly; New York County, 16th District; 1918–1929	Succeeded by William Schwartz
Preceded by Charles D. Donohue	Minority Leader in the New York State Assembly; 1924–1929	Succeeded by Peter J. Hamill
