= John B. Mullan =

American politician

John Boyd Mullan (December 27, 1863 in Rochester, Monroe County, New York – August 15, 1955 in Rochester, NY) was an American politician from New York.

== Life ==
Mullan was a member of the New York State Senate (46th D.) from 1915 to 1921, sitting in the 138th, 139th, 140th, 141st, 142nd, 143rd and 144th New York State Legislatures. He co-sponsored with Assemblyman Bert P. Gage the "Mullan–Gage Act", New York State's version of the Volstead Act, which was enacted in 1921, and repealed a few years later. Mullan resigned his seat on July 28, 1921, to accept an appointment as Postmaster of Rochester.

== Sources ==
- Quits Senate to Be Postmaster in NYT on July 29, 1921
- JOHN BOYD MULLAN in NYT on August 16, 1955 (subscription required)

New York State Senate
Preceded by William L. Ormrod	New York State Senate; 46th District; 1915–1921	Succeeded by Homer E. A. Dick
