= John C. Fitzgerald =

American politician

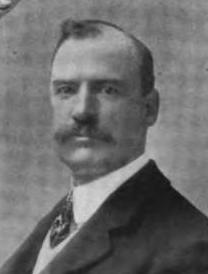
John C. Fitzgerald (1903)

John C. Fitzgerald (November 12, 1863 – June 26, 1928) was an American politician from New York.

== Life ==
He attended Public School No. 1, and then entered the glassware business. Later he was for ten years a U.S. Customs officer. In 1897, he was appointed as an expert accountant in the office of the Commissioners of Accounts of New York City.

He early entered politics as a member of Tammany Hall, and was one of the organizers of the Timothy D. Sullivan Association. When his boss ran for Congress in November 1902, Fitzgerald was nominated to succeed to Sullivan's seat in the State Senate. Fitzgerald was a member of the New York State Senate (11th D.) from 1903 to 1906, sitting in the 126th, 127th, 128th and 129th New York State Legislatures.

He was a member of the New York State Assembly (New York Co., 3rd D.) in 1912; and again a member of the State Senate (12th D.) in 1913 and 1914.

He died on June 26, 1928, at his home at 2453 Ocean Avenue in Brooklyn.

== Sources ==
- Official New York from Cleveland to Hughes by Charles Elliott Fitch (Hurd Publishing Co., New York and Buffalo, 1911, Vol. IV; pg. 365)
- The New York Red Book by Edgar L. Murlin (1903; see pg. 75f)
- JOHN C. FITZGERALD, BIG TIM'S AIDE, DEAD in NYT on June 28, 1928 (subscription required)

New York State Senate
Preceded by Timothy D. Sullivan	New York State Senate; 11th District; 1903–1906	Succeeded by Dominick F. Mullaney
New York State Assembly
Preceded by James Oliver	New York State Assembly; New York County, 3rd District; 1912	Succeeded by Harry E. Oxford
New York State Senate
Preceded by Timothy D. Sullivan	New York State Senate; 12th District; 1913–1914	Succeeded by Henry W. Doll
