= Alexander Macdonald (New York politician) =

American politician

Alexander Macdonald (September 13, 1867 – December 20, 1935) was a Canadian-American politician and conservationist.

== Life ==
Macdonald was born on September 13, 1867, in Blue's Mills, Inverness County, Nova Scotia, Canada, the son of Alexander Macdonald and Katherine Macaulay.

In 1877, Macdonald immigrated to America and lived with an uncle in Boston, Massachusetts. He studied at Boston Latin School and Monson Academy. In 1888, he began attending Middlebury College, where he was a member of the Chi Psi fraternity. He graduated with a B.A. in 1892, and received an M.A. in 1899. After he graduated, he moved to St. Regis Falls, New York and became principal of the high school. Shortly after he was naturalized, he was elected school commissioner for the second commissioner district. He held the office continuously for nine years. He was also cashier and manager of the St. Regis Falls National Bank, and was active in lumbering and manufacturing wood products.

In 1908, Macdonald was Chairman of the Republican County Committee of Franklin County. In 1909, he was elected to the New York State Assembly as a Republican, representing Franklin County. He served in the Assembly in 1910, 1911, 1912, 1913, 1914, and 1915. While in the Assembly, he served as member and chairman of the Conservation and Ways and Means Committees, and became knowledgeable and interested in the subject of conservation. He then served as Deputy Conservation Commissioner under George D. Pratt. In 1922, he was appointed Conservation Commissioner. He became very active in reforestation in the state. He was reappointed to the office by Governor Alfred E. Smith, a close personal friend, and Governor Franklin D. Roosevelt. He resigned in the end of 1930. He was also a trustee of the New York State College of Forestry.

Macdonald was a member of the New York State Agricultural Society, the Freemasons, the Elks, the Royal Arch Masonry, the Knights Templar, and the Shriners. He was also District Deputy Grand Master of the Odd Fellows. In 1900, he married Edith O'Neil, daughter of William T. O'Neil.

Macdonald died in Albany Hospital on December 20, 1935. He fell ill due to a fall and was taken to the hospital a few days beforehand. He was buried in Nova Scotia.

New York State Assembly
Preceded by Harry H. Hawley	New York State Assembly; Franklin County; 1910–1915	Succeeded by Warren T. Thayer
