= George W. Jude =

American politician

George Washington Jude (February 22, 1867 – January 26, 1958) was an American politician from New York.

== Life ==
He was born on February 22, 1867, on a farm in Findley Lake, Chautauqua County, New York, the son of Joseph Jude (1830–1878) and Mary Ann (Graham) Jude (1829–1904). He attended the district schools, and Sugar Grove Seminary. He graduated B.A. from Otterbein College in 1891. Then he taught at Sugar Grove Seminary. At the same time he took some post-graduate courses at Chicago University and studied law in the office of Green & Woodbury in Jamestown. He was admitted to the bar in 1899, and practiced in Jamestown. On December 29, 1902, he married Lyda Pearl Boardman, and they had one son.

Jude entered politics as an Independent Republican, and was a judge of the Police Court, and a member of the County Board of Education. In November 1912, he was elected on the Progressive ticket to the New York State Assembly (Chautauqua Co., 1st D.), the only Progressive state legislator elected outside New York City at this election. He was a member of the 136th New York State Legislature in 1913. In November 1913, he ran on the Progressive and Democratic tickets for re-election, but was defeated by Republican A. Morelle Cheney.

He died on January 26, 1958.

New York State Assembly
Preceded by Julius Lincoln	New York State Assembly; Chauatauqua County, 1st District; 1913	Succeeded by A. Morelle Cheney
