= Beveridge C. Dunlop =

American politician

Beveridge Colin Dunlop (April 28, 1879 – July 2, 1961) was an American businessman and politician from New York.

== Life ==
He was born on April 28, 1879, in Paterson, New Jersey, the son of John Dunlop and Jeannie (Beveridge) Dunlop. John Dunlop engaged in the manufacture of silk, and in 1887 opened a branch factory in Spring Valley, Rockland County, New York. Beveridge Dunlop attended school in Spring Valley, and finished his education at State Street High School in Hackensack, New Jersey in 1895. Afterwards he lived in Spring Valley and worked for his family's silk business and other textile companies, later becoming vice president of several rayon manufacturers. On September 6, 1904, he married Anna Norton Marvin (1880–1980), and they had four children.

In November 1913, Dunlop was elected on the Progressive ticket to the New York State Assembly (Rockland Co.), defeating the incumbent Democrat Frederick George Grimme. Dunlop polled 4,347 votes, and Grimme polled 4,287. Dunlop was a member of the 137th New York State Legislature in 1914.

In November 1914, he ran on the Progressive and Prohibition tickets for re-election, but was defeated by his predecessor Grimme. Grimme polled 3,481 votes, Republican Frank S. Harris polled 2,824 votes, and Dunlop polled 1,463.

He was a presidential elector in 1916, voting for the Republican candidates Charles Evans Hughes and Charles W. Fairbanks.

Dunlop died on July 2, 1961; and was buried at the Brick Church Cemetery in Spring Valley.

New York State Assembly
Preceded by Frederick George Grimme	New York State Assembly; Rockland County; 1914	Succeeded by Frederick George Grimme
