= John W. McKnight (politician, born 1848) =

American politician (1848–1907)

John W. McKnight

John William McKnight (December 19, 1848 – November 4, 1907) was an American politician who served in the New York State Assembly for two terms from 1890 to 1891. A Democrat, he represented Rensselaer County's third district in the 113th and 114th New York State Legislatures.

McKnight served in the American Civil War and was the principal of a public school in Castleton before entering politics. He represented the town of Schodack and served as chairman on the Rensselaer County Board of Supervisors.

He was elected to the State Assembly in November 1889. At the time, McKnight was serving as chief clerk of the post office in Castleton, making him a government employee. Opponents argued he was then ineligible to serve in the state legislature, and the Assembly election was contested by Republican candidate James S. Rowley. McKnight served on the Assembly Committee on Commerce and Navigation. He was reelected the following the year.

McKnight died on November 4, 1907, shortly after giving a speech to open a fair in Castleton honoring the McNight Hose Company. Immediately after giving closing remarks, he sat down in his chair and died.

His son, also named John W. McKnight, served as a New York state senator from 1913 to 1914.

New York State Assembly
Preceded by James Ryan Jr.	New York State Assembly; Rensselaer County, Third District; 1890-1891	Succeeded by John J. Cassin
