= George B. Wellington =

American politician (1856–1921)

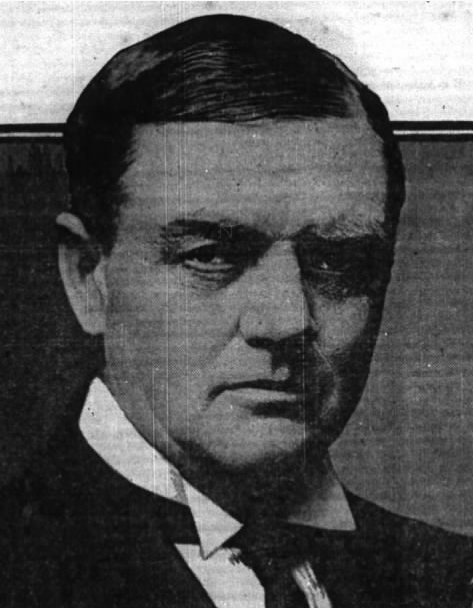

Member of the New York State Senate
- In office 1916–1918
- Preceded by: Walter A. Wood, Jr.
- Succeeded by: Charles W. Walton
- Constituency: 29th District

Personal details
- Born: George Brainerd Wellington; November 14, 1856 Troy, New York, U.S.
- Died: January 31, 1921 (aged 64) Troy, New York, U.S.
- Party: Republican
- Spouse: Harriet Townsend (m. 1880)
- Children: 5
- Education: Albany Law School
- Occupation: Lawyer, politician

George Brainerd Wellington (November 14, 1856 – January 31, 1921) was an American lawyer and politician from New York.

== Life ==
George B. Wellington was born in Troy, New York on November 14, 1856. He graduated from Rensselaer Polytechnic Institute in 1875; from Williams College in 1876; and from Albany Law School in 1878. He practiced law in Troy, for a time in partnership with Frank S. Black. In 1880, Wellington married Harriet Townsend (died 1940), and they had five children. He was an Assistant U.S. Attorney from 1887 to 1888; and Corporation Counsel of the City of Troy from 1906 to 1912.

Wellington was a member of the New York State Senate (29th D.) from 1916 to 1918, sitting in the 139th, 140th and 141st New York State Legislatures. In November 1918, he was defeated for re-election by Democrat John J. Mackrell.

In January 1921, he underwent an operation in Albany Hospital, and died a few days later, on January 31, at his home in Troy, New York.

New York State Senate
Preceded by Walter A. Wood, Jr.	New York State Senate; 29th District; 1916–1918	Succeeded by Charles W. Walton
