= Alvah W. Burlingame Jr. =

American lawyer and politician (1879–1952)

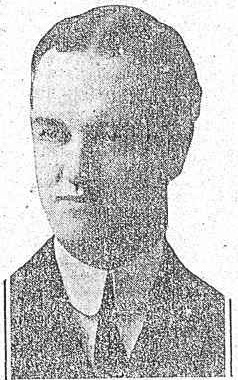
Alvah W. Burlingame Jr. (1913)

Alvah Waterman Burlingame Jr. (August 22, 1879 – May 18, 1952) was an American lawyer and politician from New York.

== Life ==
He was born on August 22, 1879, in Brooklyn, Kings County, New York, the son of Alvah Waterman Burlingame and Angeline (Chichester) Burlingame.

Burlingame was a member of the New York State Senate (8th D.) in 1909 and 1910. On November 30, 1910, he married Emilie A. Butler (c.1886–1972), and they had two children.

He was a member of the New York State Assembly (Kings Co., 17th D.) in 1914; and was Chairman of the Committee on Military Affairs.

He was again a member of the State Senate from 1915 to 1922, sitting in the 138th, 139th, 140th, 141st, 142nd, 143rd, 144th and 145th New York State Legislatures.

In September 1935, he was appointed as a city magistrate; and in December 1935 to the Court of Special Sessions.

He died on May 18, 1952, in Brooklyn.

== Sources ==
- Official New York from Cleveland to Hughes by Charles Elliott Fitch (Hurd Publishing Co., New York and Buffalo, 1911, Vol. IV; pg. 366)
- State Senator Burlingame Weds in NYT on December 1, 1910
- 3 NAMED TO COURTS SWORN IN BY MAYOR in NYT on September 24, 1935 (subscription required)
- BENCH APPOINTEES SWORN IN BY MAYOR in NYT on December 17, 1935 (subscription required)
- Burlingame genealogy at Long Island Surnames

New York State Senate
Preceded by Charles H. Fuller	New York State Senate; 8th District; 1909–1910	Succeeded by James F. Duhamel
New York State Assembly
Preceded by Frederick Ulrich	New York State Assembly; Kings County, 17th District; 1914	Succeeded by Frederick A. Wells
New York State Senate
Preceded by James F. Duhamel	New York State Senate; 8th District; 1915–1922	Succeeded by William L. Love
