= Ulysses Argetsinger =

American politician (1866–1942)

Ulysses G. Argetsinger

Member of the Minnesota House of Representatives from the 11th district
- In office January 2, 1899 – January 6, 1901 Serving with Gilbert Guttersen and Nils Nyquist
- Preceded by: John Wilkinson
- Succeeded by: George W. Norman; Nils Nyquist; George R. Wilder

Personal details
- Born: 1866 Steuben County, New York
- Died: October 16, 1942 (aged 75–76)
- Party: Republican

Ulysses G. Argetsinger (1866 — October 16, 1942) was an American politician and lawyer. He served one term in the Minnesota House of Representatives as a Republican.

== Biography ==
Argetsinger was born in 1866 in Steuben County, New York. Outside of politics, he worked as a lawyer. He moved to Minnesota in 1874.

He was elected to the Minnesota House of Representatives in 1898, as one of three representatives from the 11th district. At the time he was elected, he lived in Mapleton.

He invented an adjustable socket wrench for use in automotive repair, for which he was granted US Patent 1,357,935 on November 9, 1920.

Argetsinger died on October 16, 1942.
