= LaFayette W. Argetsinger =

American farmer and politician

LaFayette William Argetsinger (February 24, 1858 – October 30, 1937) was an American farmer and politician from New York.

== Life ==
Argetsinger was born on February 24, 1858, in Rutland Township, Pennsylvania, the son of carpenter Peter Argetsinger and Clara Wood Updyke.

When Argetsinger was very young, he moved with his family to a large farm south of Geneva, New York, on Seneca Lake. A few years later, the family moved to Elmira, where he attended school. He worked as a trainman for the Northern Central Railroad.

In 1884, Argetsinger bought a fruit farm near Burdett. Although he had no farming experience at the time, he gradually expanded his land holdings and developed one of the larger fruit farms in the county.

In 1909, Argetsinger was elected to the New York State Assembly as a Republican, representing Schuyler County. He served in the Assembly in 1910. He also served as town supervisor for Hector, and was chairman of the Republican County Committee.

In 1883, Argetsinger married Eulalia Reynolds. Their children were J. Cameron and Lafayette W. Jr.

Argetsinger died in Shepard Hospital in Montour Falls on October 30, 1937. He was buried in Hector Union Cemetery in Burdett.

New York State Assembly
Preceded by William E. Leffingwell	New York State Assembly; Schuyler County; 1910	Succeeded by John W. Gurnett
