= George F. Argetsinger =

American politician

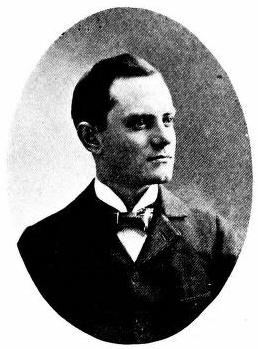
George F. Argetsinger (1902)

George F. Argetsinger (1874 in Pennsylvania – February 11, 1951 in Rochester, Monroe County, New York) was an American politician from New York.

== Life ==
He removed to Rochester in 1892.

Argetsinger was a member of the New York State Senate's 45th district from 1911 to 1918, sitting in the 134th, 135th, 136th, 137th, 138th, 139th, 140th and 141st New York State Legislatures. He did not seek renomination in 1918, and volunteered for Red Cross service in World War I instead.

He was City Comptroller of Rochester from January 1932 to February 1933.

He was active in Masonic organizations, and in 1934 was Grand Commander of the Knights Templar in the State of New York.

He died on February 11, 1951, at his home in Rochester, New York, of a heart attack; and was buried at the Mount Hope Cemetery there. His younger sister Minnie M. Argetsinger was an American Baptist missionary in China from 1919 to 1949.

== Sources ==
- Official New York from Cleveland to Hughes by Charles Elliott Fitch (Hurd Publishing Co., New York and Buffalo, 1911, Vol. IV; pg. 367)
- MANY CHANGES DUE IN STATE SENATE in NYT on August 5, 1918
- QUITS ROCHESTER POST; G. F. Argetsinger Resigns as Controller, Ending Stormy Fight in NYT on February 7, 1933 (subscription required)
- Former Senator Dies in the Evening Recorder of Amsterdam, New York, on February

New York State Senate
Preceded by George L. Meade	New York State Senate; 45th District; 1911–1918	Succeeded by James L. Whitley
