= Homer E. A. Dick =

American politician (1884–1942)

Homer E A Dick (March 22, 1884 in Three Mile Bay, New York – January 22, 1942 in Rochester, New York) was an American lawyer and politician from New York.

== Life ==
He was the son of Charles H. Dick (1858–1942) and Ida P. (Maine) Dick (1861–1919).

Dick was a member of the New York State Senate (46th D.) from 1922 to 1928, sitting in the 145th, 146th, 147th, 148th, 149th, 150th and 151st New York State Legislatures.

He died on January 22, 1942, in Rochester, New York, from his injuries after having been hit by a motorist on the previous evening; and was buried at the Brookside Cemetery in Watertown.

== Sources ==
New York State Senate
Preceded by John B. Mullan	New York State Senate; 46th District; 1922–1928	Succeeded by Fred J. Slater
