= Minnie M. Argetsinger =

Baptist missionary

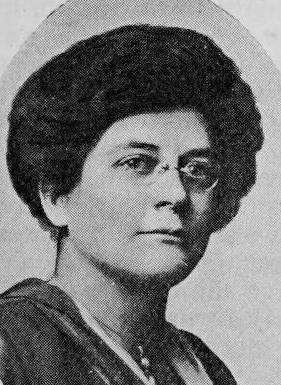
- Minnie M. Argetsinger from a 1919 publication.
- Born: Minnie Miranda Argetsinger; March 2, 1882; Mansfield, Pennsylvania
- Died: March 17, 1954 (aged 72); Boston, Massachusetts
- Occupations: Baptist missionary in China, the Philippines

Minnie Miranda Argetsinger (March 2, 1882 – March 17, 1954) was an American Baptist missionary in China and the Philippines for 32 years.

== Early life ==
Argetsinger was born in Mansfield, Pennsylvania, the daughter of James M. Argetsinger and Ruby Soper Argetsinger. Both of her parents were born in Pennsylvania. Her brother George Argetsinger was a New York State senator.

Argetsinger trained as a teacher at Mansfield State Normal School, graduating in 1901. She pursued further training at New York University and Columbia University.

== Career ==
Argetsinger was a teacher in Mansfield, Tioga County, and Yonkers as a young woman. She was commissioned by the Woman's American Baptist Foreign Mission Society in 1919, and sent to Chengdu, Sichuan province. She trained teachers in China at the Union Normal School, and ministered to children, elderly women, and refugees. She provided a reading room in her home for local visitors.

Argetsinger was in the United States on furlough in 1928, and again from 1935 to 1937. In 1939, she wrote from Chengdu about the aftermath of Japanese bombardment: "I picked up a hot piece of shrapnel off the lawn, the other day," she wrote to her brother, noting that the metal was American-made scrap iron.

In 1948 she wrote with optimism about the place of women in the new China: "Dawn has already passed in the expansion of women's work. The work for women at the present time has no limitations and is full of possibilities." By 1949, when Western missionaries were no longer allowed in China, she was reassigned to Capiz province in the Philippines for her last two years of mission work. She retired in 1951. Into her last years, she spoke across the United States, to church groups and other organizations, about her work.

== Personal life ==
Argetsinger and her friend Mary E. Gifford lived together in Yonkers; they also owned a camp together called "Giffarget" in the Adirondacks, beginning in 1916. Argetsinger died in 1954, while in Boston to attend a church gathering. There is a small collection of her correspondence in the American Baptist Historical Society archives.
