= Edward J. Dowling =

American politician

Edward J. Dowling (born December 8, 1875, in New York City) was an American lawyer and politician from New York.

== Life ==
Dowling was a member of the New York State Senate (19th D.) from 1917 to 1920, sitting in the 140th, 141st, 142nd and 143rd New York State Legislatures.

In April 1934, Dowling pleaded guilty to second-degree grand larceny, and—after making restitution—received a suspended sentence for having stolen $20,000 in Liberty bonds from the estate of two small children.

== Sources ==
- New York Red Book (1920; pg. 147)

New York State Senate
Preceded by George W. Simpson	New York State Senate; 19th District; 1917–1920	Succeeded by William Duggan
