= 132nd New York State Legislature =

New York state legislative session

←	131st	133rd	→
- New York State Capitol (2009)

Overview
- Legislative body: New York State Legislature
- Jurisdiction: New York, United States
- Term: January 1 – December 31, 1909

Senate
- Members: 51
- President: Lt. Gov. Horace White (R)
- Temporary President: John Raines (R)
- Party control: Republican (35-16)

Assembly
- Members: 150
- Speaker: James Wolcott Wadsworth Jr. (R)
- Party control: Republican (99-51)

Sessions
- 1st: January 6 – April 30, 1909

The 132nd New York State Legislature, consisting of the New York State Senate and the New York State Assembly, met from January 6 to April 30, 1909, during the third year of Charles Evans Hughes's governorship, in Albany.

== Background ==
Under the provisions of the New York Constitution of 1894, re-apportioned in 1906 and 1907, 51 Senators and 150 assemblymen were elected in single-seat districts; senators for a two-year term, assemblymen for a one-year term. The senatorial districts were made up of entire counties, except New York County (twelve districts), Kings County (eight districts), Erie County (three districts) and Monroe County (two districts). The Assembly districts were made up of contiguous area, all within the same county.

On April 27, 1906, the Legislature re-apportioned the Senate districts, increasing the number to 51. The apportionment was then contested in the courts.

The Legislature also re-apportioned the number of assemblymen per county. Nassau County was separated from the remainder of Queens County; Albany, Broome, Cattaraugus, Cayuga, Onondaga, Oswego and Rensselaer counties lost one seat each; Erie, Monroe and Westchester gained one each; and Kings and Queens counties gained two each.

On April 3, 1907, the new Senate and Assembly apportionment was declared unconstitutional by the New York Court of Appeals.

On July 26, 1907, the Legislature again re-apportioned the Senate districts, and re-enacted the 1906 Assembly apportionment.

At this time there were two major political parties: the Republican Party and the Democratic Party. The Independence League, the Socialist Party, the Prohibition Party and the Socialist Labor Party also nominated tickets.

== Elections ==
The 1908 New York state election, was held on November 3. Gov. Charles Evans Hughes was re-elected; and State Senator Horace White was elected Lieutenant Governor; both Republicans. The other six statewide elective offices up for election were also carried by the Republicans. The approximate party strength at this election, as expressed by the vote for Governor, was: Republican 805,000; Democratic 735,000; Independence League 43,000; Socialists 34,000; Prohibition 19,000; and Socialist Labor 4,000.

== Sessions ==
The Legislature met for the regular session at the State Capitol in Albany on January 6, 1909; and adjourned on April 30.

James Wolcott Wadsworth Jr. (R) was re-elected Speaker.

John Raines (R) was re-elected President pro tempore of the State Senate.

On January 19, the Legislature elected U.S. Secretary of State Elihu Root (R) to succeed Thomas C. Platt (R) as U.S. Senator from New York for a six-year term beginning on March 4, 1909.

== State Senate ==
=== Districts ===
- 1st District: Nassau and Suffolk counties
- 2nd District: Queens County
- 3rd, 4th, 5th, 6th, 7th, 8th, 9th and 10th District: Parts of Kings County, i.e. the Borough of Brooklyn
- 11th, 12th, 13th, 14th, 15th, 16th, 17th, 18th, 19th, 20th, 21st and 22nd District: Parts of New York County, i.e. the boroughs of Manhattan and the Bronx
- 23rd District: Richmond and Rockland counties
- 24th District: Westchester County
- 25th District: Orange and Sullivan counties
- 26th District: Columbia, Dutchess and Putnam and counties
- 27th District: Greene and Ulster counties
- 28th District: Albany County
- 29th District: Rensselaer County
- 30th District: Saratoga and Washington counties
- 31st District: Montgomery, Schenectady and Schoharie counties
- 32nd District: Lewis, Fulton, Hamilton and Herkimer counties
- 33rd District: Clinton, Essex and Warren counties
- 34th District: Franklin and St. Lawrence counties
- 35th District: Jefferson and Oswego counties
- 36th District: Oneida County
- 37th District: Chenango, Madison and Otsego counties
- 38th District: Onondaga County
- 39th District: Broome and Delaware counties
- 40th District: Cayuga, Cortland and Seneca counties
- 41st District: Chemung, Schuyler, Tioga and Tompkins counties
- 42nd District: Ontario, Wayne and Yates counties
- 43rd District: Steuben and Livingston counties
- 44th District: Allegany, Genesee and Wyoming counties
- 45th and 46th District: Monroe County
- 47th District: Niagara and Orleans counties
- 48th, 49th and 50th District: Erie County
- 51st District: Cattaraugus and Chautauqua counties

=== Members ===
The asterisk (*) denotes members of the previous Legislature who continued in office as members of this Legislature. Orlando Hubbs, Robert F. Wagner, George M. S. Schulz, J. Mayhew Wainwright, George L. Meade and Charles Mann Hamilton changed from the Assembly to the Senate.

Note: For brevity, the chairmanships omit the words "...the Committee on (the)..."

District	Senator	Party	Notes
1st	Orlando Hubbs*	Republican	Chairman of Affairs of Villages
2nd	Dennis J. Harte*	Democrat	re-elected
3rd	Thomas H. Cullen*	Democrat	re-elected
4th	Reuben L. Gledhill	Republican	
5th	Barth S. Cronin	Democrat	
6th	Eugene M. Travis*	Republican	re-elected; Chairman of Banks
7th	Patrick H. McCarren*	Democrat	re-elected; died on October 23, 1909
8th	Alvah W. Burlingame Jr.	Republican	
9th	John Kissel	Republican	
10th	Charles Alt	Republican	
11th	Christopher D. Sullivan*	Democrat	re-elected
12th	Timothy D. Sullivan	Democrat	
13th	William J. A. Caffrey	Democrat	
14th	Thomas F. Grady*	Democrat	re-elected; re-elected Minority Leader
15th	Thomas J. McManus*	Democrat	re-elected
16th	Robert F. Wagner*	Democrat	
17th	George B. Agnew*	Republican	re-elected; Chairman of Printed and Engrossed Bills
18th	Alexander Brough	Republican	
19th	Josiah T. Newcomb	Republican	Chairman of Indian Affairs
20th	James J. Frawley*	Democrat	re-elected
21st	Stephen J. Stilwell	Democrat	
22nd	George M. S. Schulz*	Democrat	
23rd	Howard R. Bayne	Democrat	
24th	J. Mayhew Wainwright*	Republican	Chairman of Miscellaneous Corporations
25th	John B. Rose	Republican	Chairman of Military Affairs
26th	John F. Schlosser	Republican	Chairman of Privileges and Elections
27th	John N. Cordts*	Republican	re-elected; Chairman of Commerce and Navigation
28th	William J. Grattan*	Republican	re-elected; Chairman of Insurance
29th	Victor M. Allen	Republican	Chairman of Canals
30th	Edgar T. Brackett	Republican	
31st	William A. Gardner	Democrat	
32nd	Seth G. Heacock*	Republican	re-elected; Chairman of Internal Affairs of Towns and Counties
33rd	James A. Emerson*	Republican	re-elected; Chairman of Penal Institutions
34th	William T. O'Neil*	Republican	re-elected; Chairman of Revision; died on May 5, 1909
35th	George H. Cobb*	Republican	re-elected; Chairman of Railroads
36th	Frederick M. Davenport	Republican	
37th	Jotham P. Allds*	Republican	re-elected; Chairman of Finance
38th	Hendrick S. Holden	Republican	
39th	Harvey D. Hinman*	Republican	re-elected; Chairman of Affairs of Cities
40th	Charles J. Hewitt	Republican	Chairman of Public Printing
41st	Benn Conger	Republican	Chairman of Trades and Manufactures
42nd	John Raines*	Republican	re-elected; re-elected President pro tempore; Chairman of Rules; died on December 16, 1909
43rd	Frank C. Platt	Republican	Chairman of Agriculture
44th	George H. Witter	Republican	Chairman of Public Health
45th	George L. Meade*	Republican	Chairman of Taxation and Retrenchment
46th	Charles J. White	Republican	
47th	James P. Mackenzie	Republican	
48th	Henry W. Hill*	Republican	re-elected; Chairman of Codes
49th	Samuel J. Ramsperger*	Democrat	re-elected
50th	George Allen Davis*	Republican	re-elected; Chairman of Judiciary
51st	Charles Mann Hamilton*	Republican	Chairman of Forest, Fish and Game

=== Employees ===
- Clerk: Lafayette B. Gleason
- Sergeant-at-Arms: Charles R. Hotaling
- General Committee Clerk: William S. Coffey

== State Assembly ==
=== Assemblymen ===
Note: For brevity, the chairmanships omit the words "...the Committee on (the)..."

District		Assemblymen	Party	Notes
Albany	1st	J. Newton Fiero	Republican	
Albany	2nd	William E. Nolan*	Republican	
Albany	3rd	Robert B. Waters*	Republican	Chairman of State Prisons
Allegany		Jesse S. Phillips*	Republican	Chairman of Judiciary
Broome		Harry C. Perkins*	Republican	
Cattaraugus		Ellsworth J. Cheney	Republican	
Cayuga		William B. Reed	Republican	
Chautauqua	1st	Augustus F. Allen*	Republican	
Chautauqua	2nd	John Leo Sullivan	Republican	
Chemung		Seymour Lowman	Republican	
Chenango		Julien C. Scott*	Republican	
Clinton		William R. Weaver	Republican	
Columbia		Albert S. Callan	Republican	
Cortland		Charles F. Brown*	Republican	
Delaware		Henry J. Williams*	Republican	
Dutchess	1st	Myron Smith*	Republican	
Dutchess	2nd	Everett H. Travis	Republican	
Erie	1st	Orson J. Weimert*	Republican	Chairman of Indian Affairs
Erie	2nd	John Lord O'Brian*	Republican	
Erie	3rd	Leo J. Neupert	Democrat	
Erie	4th	Edward D. Jackson	Democrat	
Erie	5th	Edward P. Costello*	Democrat	
Erie	6th	James M. Rozan	Democrat	
Erie	7th	Gottfried H. Wende	Democrat	
Erie	8th	Clarence MacGregor*	Republican	Chairman of Military Affairs
Erie	9th	Frank B. Thorn*	Republican	
Essex		James Shea*	Republican	
Franklin		Harry H. Hawley*	Republican	
Fulton and Hamilton		Scott Partridge	Democrat	
Genesee		Fred B. Parker*	Republican	
Greene		William C. Brady*	Republican	Chairman of Affairs of Villages
Herkimer		Charles F. Fellows	Republican	
Jefferson	1st	Alfred D. Lowe*	Republican	Chairman of Public Lands and Forestry
Jefferson	2nd	Gary H. Wood*	Republican	Chairman of Public Health
Kings	1st	Henry S. Goodspeed	Republican	
Kings	2nd	William J. Gillen	Democrat	
Kings	3rd	Michael A. O'Neil	Democrat	
Kings	4th	George W. Brown	Republican	
Kings	5th	Charles J. Weber*	Republican	
Kings	6th	Thomas J. Surpless*	Republican	Chairman of Revision
Kings	7th	Thomas J. Geoghegan*	Democrat	
Kings	8th	John J. McKeon	Democrat	
Kings	9th	George A. Voss*	Republican	Chairman of Labor and Industries
Kings	10th	Charles F. Murphy*	Republican	Chairman of Codes
Kings	11th	William W. Colne*	Republican	Chairman of Canals
Kings	12th	George A. Green*	Republican	Chairman of General Laws
Kings	13th	John H. Donnelly*	Democrat	
Kings	14th	James E. Fay*	Democrat	
Kings	15th	John J. Schutta*	Democrat	
Kings	16th	Robert H. Clarke	Republican	
Kings	17th	John R. Farrar*	Republican	
Kings	18th	Warren I. Lee*	Republican	Chairman of Public Institutions
Kings	19th	Felix J. Sanner	Democrat	
Kings	20th	Harrison C. Glore*	Republican	
Kings	21st	Samuel A. Gluck*	Democrat	
Kings	22nd	Albert Lachman	Republican	
Kings	23rd	Isaac Sargent*	Republican	
Lewis		C. Fred Boshart*	Republican	Chairman of Agriculture
Livingston		James Wolcott Wadsworth Jr.*	Republican	re-elected Speaker; Chairman of Rules
Madison		Orlando W. Burhyte*	Republican	
Monroe	1st	Edward H. White	Republican	
Monroe	2nd	James L. Whitley*	Republican	
Monroe	3rd	Louis E. Lazarus	Republican	
Monroe	4th	Cyrus W. Phillips	Republican	
Monroe	5th	John J. McInerney	Republican	
Montgomery		T. Romeyn Staley*	Republican	
Nassau		William G. Miller*	Republican	Chairman of Commerce and Navigation
New York	1st	Thomas B. Caughlan*	Democrat	
New York	2nd	Al Smith*	Democrat	
New York	3rd	James Oliver*	Democrat	
New York	4th	Aaron J. Levy*	Democrat	
New York	5th	John T. Eagleton*	Democrat	
New York	6th	Adolph Stern*	Democrat	
New York	7th	Peter P. McElligott	Democrat	
New York	8th	Moritz Graubard*	Democrat	
New York	9th	John C. Hackett*	Democrat	
New York	10th	Harold Spielberg	Democrat	
New York	11th	Owen W. Bohan	Democrat	
New York	12th	James A. Foley*	Democrat	
New York	13th	James J. Hoey*	Democrat	
New York	14th	John J. Herrick*	Democrat	
New York	15th	William M. Bennett*	Republican	
New York	16th	Martin G. McCue*	Democrat	
New York	17th	Frederick R. Toombs*	Republican	
New York	18th	Mark Goldberg*	Democrat	
New York	19th	Andrew F. Murray	Republican	
New York	20th	Patrick J. McGrath*	Democrat	
New York	21st	Robert S. Conklin*	Republican	
New York	22nd	George W. Baumann	Democrat	
New York	23rd	James A. Francis*	Republican	Chairman of Banks
New York	24th	Thomas A. Brennan	Democrat	
New York	25th	Artemas Ward Jr.*	Republican	
New York	26th	Irving J. Joseph	Democrat	
New York	27th	Beverley R. Robinson*	Republican	
New York	28th	Jacob Levy	Democrat	
New York	29th	Lindon Bates Jr.	Republican	
New York	30th	Louis A. Cuvillier*	Democrat	
New York	31st	Samuel Marks	Republican	
New York	32nd	Jesse Silbermann*	Democrat	
New York	33rd	Phillip J. Schmidt*	Democrat	
New York	34th	Charles Stein	Democrat	
New York	35th	John V. Sheridan*	Democrat	
Niagara	1st	Joseph A. Jordan	Democrat	
Niagara	2nd	W. Levell Draper*	Republican	Chairman of Privileges and Elections
Oneida	1st	John W. Manley	Democrat	
Oneida	2nd	Ladd J. Lewis Jr.*	Republican	
Oneida	3rd	C. Robert Edwards	Republican	
Onondaga	1st	John C. McLaughlin*	Republican	
Onondaga	2nd	Fred W. Hammond*	Republican	Chairman of Affairs of Cities
Onondaga	3rd	J. Henry Walters*	Republican	
Ontario		George B. Hemenway*	Republican	
Orange	1st	Caleb H. Baumes	Republican	
Orange	2nd	Charles A. Evans	Democrat	
Orleans		Frank J. Murphy	Republican	
Oswego		Frank L. Smith	Republican	
Otsego		Charles Smith*	Republican	
Putnam		John R. Yale*	Republican	Chairman of Electricity, Gas and Water
Queens	1st	Thomas H. Todd*	Democrat	
Queens	2nd	William Klein*	Democrat	
Queens	3rd	Conrad Garbe*	Democrat	
Queens	4th	William A. De Groot*	Republican	Chairman of Claims
Rensselaer	1st	Frederick C. Filley*	Republican	Chairman of Public Education
Rensselaer	2nd	Bradford R. Lansing*	Republican	Chairman of Charitable and Religious Societies
Richmond		Thomas J. Lanahan	Democrat	
Rockland		Rutledge I. Odell	Republican	
St. Lawrence	1st	Fred J. Gray*	Republican	Chairman of Excise
St. Lawrence	2nd	Edwin A. Merritt Jr.*	Republican	Majority Leader; Chairman of Ways and Means
Saratoga		George H. Whitney*	Republican	Chairman of Internal Affairs
Schenectady		Loren H. White	Democrat	
Schoharie		Daniel D. Frisbie	Democrat	Minority Leader
Schuyler		William E. Leffingwell	Democrat	
Seneca		Alexander C. Martin	Republican	
Steuben	1st	John L. Miller	Republican	Chairman of Soldiers' Home
Steuben	2nd	Charles K. Marlatt*	Republican	Chairman of Unfinished Business
Suffolk	1st	John M. Lupton*	Republican	Chairman of Fisheries and Game
Suffolk	2nd	George L. Thompson	Republican	
Sullivan		Calvin Millen	Republican	
Tioga		Frank L. Howard*	Republican	
Tompkins		William R. Gunderman*	Republican	Chairman of Trades and Manufactures
Ulster	1st	Joseph M. Fowler*	Republican	Chairman of Public Printing
Ulster	2nd	Edward Young	Republican	
Warren		William R. Waddell*	Republican	Chairman of Taxation and Retrenchment
Washington		James S. Parker*	Republican	Chairman of Railroads
Wayne		Edson W. Hamn*	Republican	Chairman of Insurance
Westchester	1st	Harry W. Haines*	Republican	
Westchester	2nd	Holland S. Duell	Republican	Chairman of Federal Relations
Westchester	3rd	Frank L. Young	Republican	
Westchester	4th	George W. Mead	Republican	
Wyoming		Robert M. McFarlane*	Republican	
Yates		Llewellyn J. Barden	Republican	

=== Employees ===
- Clerk: Ray B. Smith
- Sergeant-at-Arms: Bernard J. Haggarty

== Sources ==
- Official New York from Cleveland to Hughes by Charles Elliott Fitch (Hurd Publishing Co., New York and Buffalo, 1911, Vol. IV; see pg. 356ff for assemblymen; and 366f for senators)
- REPUBLICANS GAIN IN LEGISLATURE in NYT on November 4, 1908
- Manual of Rules and Practice of the Senate (1909)
- REPUBLICAN CAUCUS NAMES WADSWORTH in NYT on January 6, 1909
- COMMITTEES ARE NAMED in NYT on January 14, 1909
