= 133rd New York State Legislature =

New York state legislative session

←	132nd	134th	→
- New York State Capitol (2009)

Overview
- Legislative body: New York State Legislature
- Jurisdiction: New York, United States
- Term: January 1 – December 31, 1910

Senate
- Members: 51
- President: Lt. Gov. Horace White (R)
- Temporary President: Jotham P. Allds (R), until February 23; George H. Cobb (R), from March 11
- Party control: Republican (35-16)

Assembly
- Members: 150
- Speaker: James Wolcott Wadsworth Jr. (R)
- Party control: Republican (94-56)

Sessions
- 1st: January 5 – May 27, 1910
- 2nd: June 20 – July 1, 1910

The 133rd New York State Legislature, consisting of the New York State Senate and the New York State Assembly, met from January 5 to July 1, 1910, during the fourth year of Charles Evans Hughes's governorship, in Albany.

== Background ==
Under the provisions of the New York Constitution of 1894, re-apportioned in 1906 and 1907, 51 Senators and 150 assemblymen were elected in single-seat districts; senators for a two-year term, assemblymen for a one-year term. The senatorial districts were made up of entire counties, except New York County (twelve districts), Kings County (eight districts), Erie County (three districts) and Monroe County (two districts). The Assembly districts were made up of contiguous area, all within the same county.

At this time there were two major political parties: the Republican Party and the Democratic Party.

== Elections ==
The New York state election, 1909, was held on November 2. No statewide elective offices were up for election.

== Sessions ==
On January 4, the Republican state senators met in caucus and nominated Jotham P. Allds for president pro tempore. Eight senators (Agnew, Brackett, Conger, Cordts, Davenport, Hinman, Newcomb and Rose) did not attend the caucus, and issued a statement opposing Allds.

The Legislature met for the regular session at the State Capitol in Albany on January 5, 1910; and adjourned on May 27.

James Wolcott Wadsworth Jr. (R) was re-elected Speaker.

Jotham P. Allds (R) was elected president pro tempore of the State Senate.

On January 18, the press published that Senator Benn Conger accused Allds of having demanded and received bribes.

On January 19, Allds demanded an investigation by the State Senate.

On January 30, Conger filed the accusation before the State Senate, stating that Allds had "demanded, received and accepted $1,000 on or about April 23, 1901, in consideration for his failure to pass a certain bill then pending before the Assembly."

On February 3, Allds answered the accusation with a denial.

On February 8 and 9, Hiram G. Moe testified before the investigating committee that he had handed over the envelope containing the money.;

On February 23, Allds resigned the Presidency pro tempore.

On March 11, George H. Cobb was elected president pro tempore of the State Senate.

On March 29, the State Senate found Allds guilty by a vote of 40 to 9, but Allds had resigned just before the begin of the session to avoid expulsion.

On April 4, Conger resigned his seat, and retired from politics.

The Legislature met for a special session at the State Capitol in Albany on June 20, 1910; and adjourned on July 1. This session was called to consider legislation to abolish party conventions, and nominate candidates for office by primary elections instead. This measure had met with fierce resistance from the party bosses. The "Hinman-Green bill" (which proposed this change) had been defeated in the Senate and in the Assembly. The "Cobb compromise" (amending the Hinman-Green bill) had passed the State Senate, but was defeated in the Assembly on May 27.

On June 30, the "Cobb Direct Nominations bill" was defeated in the Assembly by a vote of 80 to 63.

On July 1, the State Senate also defeated the Cobb bill, with a vote of 25 for and 19 against it (one vote short of the necessary 26 to approve). The Legislature enacted a "Progressive Inheritance Tax bill", and then adjourned.

== State Senate ==
=== Districts ===
- 1st District: Nassau and Suffolk counties
- 2nd District: Queens County
- 3rd, 4th, 5th, 6th, 7th, 8th, 9th and 10th District: Parts of Kings County, i.e. the Borough of Brooklyn
- 11th, 12th, 13th, 14th, 15th, 16th, 17th, 18th, 19th, 20th, 21st and 22nd District: Parts of New York County, i.e. the boroughs of Manhattan and the Bronx
- 23rd District: Richmond and Rockland counties
- 24th District: Westchester County
- 25th District: Orange and Sullivan counties
- 26th District: Columbia, Dutchess and Putnam and counties
- 27th District: Greene and Ulster counties
- 28th District: Albany County
- 29th District: Rensselaer County
- 30th District: Saratoga and Washington counties
- 31st District: Montgomery, Schenectady and Schoharie counties
- 32nd District: Lewis, Fulton, Hamilton and Herkimer counties
- 33rd District: Clinton, Essex and Warren counties
- 34th District: Franklin and St. Lawrence counties
- 35th District: Jefferson and Oswego counties
- 36th District: Oneida County
- 37th District: Chenango, Madison and Otsego counties
- 38th District: Onondaga County
- 39th District: Broome and Delaware counties
- 40th District: Cayuga, Cortland and Seneca counties
- 41st District: Chemung, Schuyler, Tioga and Tompkins counties
- 42nd District: Ontario, Wayne and Yates counties
- 43rd District: Steuben and Livingston counties
- 44th District: Allegany, Genesee and Wyoming counties
- 45th and 46th District: Monroe County
- 47th District: Niagara and Orleans counties
- 48th, 49th and 50th District: Erie County
- 51st District: Cattaraugus and Chautauqua counties

=== Members ===
The asterisk (*) denotes members of the previous Legislature who continued in office as members of this Legislature.

Note: For brevity, the chairmanships omit the words "the Committee on (the)" from the titles of committees. The chairmanships are listed as appointed at the beginning of the session. The President pro tempore is ex officio Chairman of the Committee on Rules.

District	Senator	Party	Notes
1st	Orlando Hubbs*	Republican	
2nd	Dennis J. Harte*	Democrat	
3rd	Thomas H. Cullen*	Democrat	
4th	Reuben L. Gledhill*	Republican	
5th	Barth S. Cronin*	Democrat	
6th	Eugene M. Travis*	Republican	Chairman of Banks
7th	Thomas C. Harden	Democrat	elected to fill vacancy, in place of Patrick H. McCarren
8th	Alvah W. Burlingame Jr.*	Republican	
9th	John Kissel*	Republican	
10th	Charles Alt*	Republican	
11th	Christopher D. Sullivan*	Democrat	
12th	Timothy D. Sullivan*	Democrat	
13th	William J. A. Caffrey*	Democrat	
14th	Thomas F. Grady*	Democrat	Minority Leader
15th	Thomas J. McManus*	Democrat	
16th	Robert F. Wagner*	Democrat	
17th	George B. Agnew*	Republican	
18th	Alexander Brough*	Republican	
19th	Josiah T. Newcomb*	Republican	
20th	James J. Frawley*	Democrat	
21st	Stephen J. Stilwell*	Democrat	
22nd	George M. S. Schulz*	Democrat	
23rd	Howard R. Bayne*	Democrat	
24th	J. Mayhew Wainwright*	Republican	Chairman of Miscellaneous Corporations
25th	John B. Rose*	Republican	
26th	John F. Schlosser*	Republican	
27th	John N. Cordts*	Republican	Chairman of Commerce and Navigation
28th	William J. Grattan*	Republican	
29th	Victor M. Allen*	Republican	Chairman of Canals
30th	Edgar T. Brackett*	Republican	Chairman of Codes
31st	William A. Gardner*	Democrat	
32nd	Seth G. Heacock*	Republican	Chairman of Internal Affairs of Towns and Counties
33rd	James A. Emerson*	Republican	
34th	Herbert P. Coats	Republican	elected to fill vacancy, in place of William T. O'Neil; Chairman of Revision
35th	George H. Cobb*	Republican	Chairman of Railroads; elected President pro tempore on March 11
36th	Frederick M. Davenport*	Republican	
37th	Jotham P. Allds*	Republican	elected President pro tempore on January 5; resigned as president pro tempore on February 23; resigned his seat on March 29 to avoid expulsion
37th	Ralph W. Thomas	Republican	elected to fill vacancy on April 28
38th	Hendrick S. Holden*	Republican	
39th	Harvey D. Hinman*	Republican	Chairman of Affairs of Cities
40th	Charles J. Hewitt*	Republican	
41st	Benn Conger*	Republican	resigned his seat on April 4
42nd	vacant		Senator John Raines died on December 16, 1909
42nd	Frederick W. Griffith	Republican	elected on January 25; took his seat on February 3
43rd	Frank C. Platt*	Republican	
44th	George H. Witter*	Republican	
45th	George L. Meade*	Republican	
46th	Charles J. White*	Republican	
47th	James P. Mackenzie*	Republican	
48th	Henry W. Hill*	Republican	Chairman of Finance
49th	Samuel J. Ramsperger*	Democrat	
50th	George Allen Davis*	Republican	Chairman of Judiciary
51st	Charles Mann Hamilton*	Republican	Chairman of Forest, Fish and Game

=== Employees ===
- Clerk: Lafayette B. Gleason
- Sergeant-at-Arms: Charles R. Hotaling
- Assistant Sergeant-at-Arms: John W. Burns
- Principal Doorkeeper: Christopher Warren
- Stenographer: Carlton J. Barnes

== State Assembly ==
=== Assemblymen ===
Note: For brevity, the chairmanships omit the words "the Committee on (the)" from the titles of committees.

District		Assemblymen	Party	Notes
Albany	1st	Harold J. Hinman	Republican	
Albany	2nd	William E. Nolan*	Republican	
Albany	3rd	Robert B. Waters*	Republican	Chairman of Villages
Allegany		Jesse S. Phillips*	Republican	Chairman of Judiciary
Broome		Harry C. Perkins*	Republican	Chairman of Public Lands and Forestry
Cattaraugus		Ellsworth J. Cheney*	Republican	Chairman of Printed and Engrossed Bills
Cayuga		William B. Reed*	Republican	Chairman of State Prisons
Chautauqua	1st	Augustus F. Allen*	Republican	Chairman of Insurance
Chautauqua	2nd	John Leo Sullivan*	Republican	
Chemung		Seymour Lowman*	Republican	Chairman of Excise
Chenango		Walter A. Shepardson	Republican	
Clinton		John B. Trombly	Democrat	
Columbia		Albert S. Callan*	Republican	
Cortland		Charles F. Brown*	Republican	Chairman of Federal Relations
Delaware		James R. Stevenson	Democrat	
Dutchess	1st	Myron Smith*	Republican	Chairman of Revision
Dutchess	2nd	Lewis S. Chanler	Democrat	
Erie	1st	Orson J. Weimert*	Republican	Chairman of Indian Affairs
Erie	2nd	Lafay C. Wilkie	Republican	
Erie	3rd	Leo J. Neupert*	Democrat	
Erie	4th	Edward D. Jackson*	Democrat	
Erie	5th	Richard F. Hearn	Democrat	
Erie	6th	James M. Rozan*	Democrat	
Erie	7th	Gottfried H. Wende*	Democrat	
Erie	8th	Clarence MacGregor*	Republican	Chairman of Military Affairs
Erie	9th	Frank B. Thorn*	Republican	
Essex		James Shea*	Republican	
Franklin		Alexander Macdonald	Republican	
Fulton and Hamilton		Edward Vosburgh	Republican	
Genesee		Edward M. Crocker	Democrat	
Greene		J. Lewis Patrie	Democrat	
Herkimer		George S. Eveleth	Republican	
Jefferson	1st	Luther S. Pitkin	Republican	
Jefferson	2nd	Gary H. Wood*	Republican	Chairman of Public Health
Kings	1st	Henry S. Goodspeed*	Republican	Chairman of Unfinished Business
Kings	2nd	William J. Gillen*	Democrat	
Kings	3rd	Michael A. O'Neil*	Democrat	
Kings	4th	George W. Brown*	Republican	Chairman of Public Printing
Kings	5th	Charles J. Weber*	Republican	Chairman of Privileges and Elections
Kings	6th	John H. Gerken	Democrat	
Kings	7th	Daniel F. Farrell	Democrat	
Kings	8th	John J. McKeon*	Democrat	
Kings	9th	Edmund O'Connor	Democrat	
Kings	10th	Charles Harwood	Democrat	
Kings	11th	William W. Colne*	Republican	Chairman of Canals
Kings	12th	George A. Green*	Republican	Chairman of General Laws
Kings	13th	John H. Donnelly*	Democrat	
Kings	14th	James E. Fay*	Democrat	
Kings	15th	John J. O'Neill	Democrat	
Kings	16th	Robert H. Clarke*	Republican	
Kings	17th	Edward A. Ebbets	Republican	
Kings	18th	Warren I. Lee*	Republican	Chairman of Public Institutions
Kings	19th	Felix J. Sanner*	Democrat	
Kings	20th	Harrison C. Glore*	Republican	Chairman of Banks
Kings	21st	Sam Weinstein	Republican	
Kings	22nd	Albert Lachman*	Republican	
Kings	23rd	Michael C. Beck	Democrat	
Lewis		C. Fred Boshart*	Republican	Chairman of Agriculture
Livingston		James Wolcott Wadsworth Jr.*	Republican	re-elected Speaker; Chairman of Rules
Madison		Kirk B. Delano	Republican	
Monroe	1st	Edward H. White*	Republican	
Monroe	2nd	James L. Whitley*	Republican	Chairman of Cities
Monroe	3rd	William H. Vicinus	Republican	
Monroe	4th	Cyrus W. Phillips*	Republican	
Monroe	5th	John J. McInerney*	Republican	
Montgomery		Johnson P. Van Olinda	Republican	
Nassau		William G. Miller*	Republican	Chairman of Commerce and Navigation
New York	1st	Thomas B. Caughlan*	Democrat	
New York	2nd	Al Smith*	Democrat	
New York	3rd	James Oliver*	Democrat	
New York	4th	Aaron J. Levy*	Democrat	
New York	5th	Jimmy Walker	Democrat	
New York	6th	Harry Kopp	Republican	
New York	7th	Peter P. McElligott*	Democrat	
New York	8th	Moritz Graubard*	Democrat	
New York	9th	John C. Hackett*	Democrat	
New York	10th	Harold Spielberg*	Democrat	
New York	11th	John J. Boylan	Democrat	
New York	12th	James A. Foley*	Democrat	
New York	13th	James J. Hoey*	Democrat	
New York	14th	John J. Herrick*	Democrat	
New York	15th	William M. Bennett*	Republican	
New York	16th	Martin G. McCue*	Democrat	
New York	17th	Frederick R. Toombs*	Republican	
New York	18th	Mark Goldberg*	Democrat	
New York	19th	Andrew F. Murray*	Republican	
New York	20th	Patrick J. McGrath*	Democrat	
New York	21st	Robert S. Conklin*	Republican	
New York	22nd	Edward A. Doherty	Republican	
New York	23rd	Frederick A. Higgins	Republican	
New York	24th	Thomas A. Brennan*	Democrat	
New York	25th	Artemas Ward Jr.*	Republican	
New York	26th	Irving J. Joseph*	Democrat	
New York	27th	Charles A. Dana	Republican	
New York	28th	Jacob Levy*	Democrat	
New York	29th	Lindon Bates Jr.*	Republican	
New York	30th	Peter Donovan	Republican	
New York	31st	Mitchell E. Friend	Democrat	
New York	32nd	John L. Burgoyne	Republican	
New York	33rd	John Gerhardt	Democrat	
New York	34th	Raphael Garfein	Republican	
New York	35th	Edward J. L. Raldiris	Republican	
Niagara	1st	Thomas T. Feeley	Republican	
Niagara	2nd	Philip J. Keller	Democrat	
Oneida	1st	John W. Manley*	Democrat	
Oneida	2nd	Herbert E. Allen	Republican	
Oneida	3rd	James T. Cross	Republican	
Onondaga	1st	James E. Connell	Republican	
Onondaga	2nd	John T. Roberts	Democrat	
Onondaga	3rd	J. Henry Walters*	Republican	
Ontario		Sanford W. Abbey	Ind. Dem.	
Orange	1st	Caleb H. Baumes*	Republican	
Orange	2nd	John D. Stivers	Republican	
Orleans		Coley P. Wright	Ind. Dem.	
Oswego		Thaddeus C. Sweet	Republican	
Otsego		Stephen C. Clark	Republican	
Putnam		John R. Yale*	Republican	Chairman of Electricity, Gas, and Water Supply
Queens	1st	Andrew Zorn	Democrat	
Queens	2nd	Christian F. Weiland	Republican	
Queens	3rd	Charles Metzendorf	Democrat	
Queens	4th	Theodore P. Wilsnack	Republican	
Rensselaer	1st	Frederick C. Filley*	Republican	Chairman of Public Education
Rensselaer	2nd	Bradford R. Lansing*	Republican	Chairman of Charitable and Religious Societies
Richmond		William A. Shortt	Democrat	
Rockland		Rutledge I. Odell*	Republican	
St. Lawrence	1st	Fred J. Gray*	Republican	Chairman of Taxation and Retrenchment
St. Lawrence	2nd	Edwin A. Merritt Jr.*	Republican	Majority Leader; Chairman of Ways and Means
Saratoga		George H. Whitney*	Republican	Chairman of Internal Affairs
Schenectady		Loren H. White*	Democrat	
Schoharie		Daniel D. Frisbie*	Democrat	Minority Leader
Schuyler		LaFayette W. Argetsinger	Republican	
Seneca		Charles W. Cosad	Democrat	
Steuben	1st	John L. Miller*	Republican	Chairman of Soldiers' Home
Steuben	2nd	Charles K. Marlatt*	Republican	Chairman of Labor and Industries
Suffolk	1st	John M. Lupton*	Republican	Chairman of Fisheries and Game
Suffolk	2nd	George L. Thompson*	Republican	
Sullivan		John K. Evans	Democrat	
Tioga		Frank L. Howard*	Republican	
Tompkins		Fox Holden	Republican	
Ulster	1st	Joseph M. Fowler*	Republican	Chairman of Codes
Ulster	2nd	Edward Young*	Republican	
Warren		Daniel P. De Long	Democrat	
Washington		James S. Parker*	Republican	Chairman of Railroads
Wayne		Marvin I. Greenwood	Republican	Chairman of Claims
Westchester	1st	Harry W. Haines*	Republican	Chairman of Trades and Manufactures
Westchester	2nd	William S. Coffey	Republican	
Westchester	3rd	Frank L. Young*	Republican	
Westchester	4th	John A. Goodwin	Republican	
Wyoming		James E. Brainerd	Republican	
Yates		Llewellyn J. Barden*	Republican	

=== Employees ===
- Clerk: Ray B. Smith
- Sergeant-at-Arms:
- Postmaster: James H. Underwood

== Sources ==
- Official New York from Cleveland to Hughes by Charles Elliott Fitch (Hurd Publishing Co., New York and Buffalo, 1911, Vol. IV; see pg. 358f for assemblymen; and 366f for senators)
- Proceedings of the Senate in the Matter of the Investigation Demanded by Senator Jotham P. Allds (1910)
- DEMOCRATS GAIN IN THE ASSEMBLY in NYT on November 3, 1909
- CAUCUS NAMES ALLDS; EIGHT SENATORS OUT in NYT on January 5, 1910
- HILL IS CHAIRMAN OF FINANCE COMMITTEE in Utica Herald Dispatch
