= 131st New York State Legislature =

New York state legislative session

←	130th	132nd	→
- New York State Capitol (2009)

Overview
- Legislative body: New York State Legislature
- Jurisdiction: New York, United States
- Term: January 1 – December 31, 1908

Senate
- Members: 51
- President: Lt. Gov. Lewis Stuyvesant Chanler (D)
- Temporary President: John Raines (R)
- Party control: Republican (32-19)

Assembly
- Members: 150
- Speaker: James Wolcott Wadsworth Jr. (R)
- Party control: Republican (96-54)

Sessions
- 1st: January 1 – April 23, 1908
- 2nd: May 11 – June 11, 1908

The 131st New York State Legislature, consisting of the New York State Senate and the New York State Assembly, met from January 1 to June 11, 1908, during the second year of Charles Evans Hughes's governorship, in Albany.

== Background ==
Under the provisions of the New York Constitution of 1894, re-apportioned in 1906 and 1907, 51 Senators and 150 assemblymen were elected in single-seat districts; senators for a two-year term, assemblymen for a one-year term. The senatorial districts were made up of entire counties, except New York County (twelve districts), Kings County (eight districts), Erie County (three districts) and Monroe County (two districts). The Assembly districts were made up of contiguous area, all within the same county.

On April 27, 1906, the Legislature re-apportioned the Senate districts, increasing the number to 51. The apportionment was then contested in the courts.

The Legislature also re-apportioned the number of assemblymen per county. Nassau County was separated from the remainder of Queens County; Albany, Broome, Cattaraugus, Cayuga, Onondaga, Oswego and Rensselaer counties lost one seat each; Erie, Monroe and Westchester gained one each; and Kings and Queens counties gained two each.

On April 3, 1907, the new Senate and Assembly apportionment was declared unconstitutional by the New York Court of Appeals.

On July 26, 1907, the Legislature again re-apportioned the Senate districts, and re-enacted the 1906 Assembly apportionment.

At this time there were two major political parties: the Republican Party and the Democratic Party. The Independence League, the Socialist Party and the Prohibition Party also nominated tickets.

== Elections ==
The 1907 New York state election, was held on November 5. The only two statewide elective offices up for election were two judgeships on the New York Court of Appeals which were carried by a Republican and a Democrat both of which had been endorsed by the other major party.

== Sessions ==
The Legislature met for the regular session at the State Capitol in Albany on January 1, 1908; and adjourned on April 23.

James Wolcott Wadsworth Jr. (R) was re-elected Speaker.

The Legislature met for a special session at the State Capitol in Albany on May 11, 1908; and adjourned on June 11. This session was called to consider enacting reform legislation which had been recommended by the governor at the beginning of the session, but was ignored by the Legislature. Among the measures advocated by the governor were an anti-horse-race-track-gambling bill (enacted as the Hart–Agnew Law), a plan to extend the jurisdiction of the Public Service Commission to the telephone and telegraph companies, and a ballot reform.

== State Senate ==
=== Districts ===
Note: The senators had been elected to a two-year term in November 1906 under the 1906 apportionment, as stated below. Although the Legislature re-apportioned the Senate districts in 1907, the first senatorial election under the new apportionment occurred in November 1908.

- 1st District: Nassau and Suffolk counties
- 2nd District: Queens and Richmond counties
- 3rd, 4th, 5th, 6th, 7th, 8th, 9th and 10th District: Parts of Kings County, i.e. the Borough of Brooklyn
- 11th, 12th, 13th, 14th, 15th, 16th, 17th, 18th, 19th, 20th, 21st and 22nd District: Parts of New York County, i.e. the boroughs of Manhattan and the Bronx
- 23rd District: Westchester County
- 24th District: Orange and Rockland counties
- 25th District: Columbia, Dutchess and Putnam and counties
- 26th District: Greene and Ulster counties
- 27th District: Chenango, Delaware and Sullivan counties
- 28th District: Albany County
- 29th District: Rensselaer County
- 30th District: Clinton, Essex and Washington counties
- 31st District: Saratoga and Schenectady counties
- 32nd District: Fulton, Hamilton, Montgomery and Warren counties
- 33rd District: Herkimer, Otsego and Schoharie counties
- 34th District: Franklin and St. Lawrence counties
- 35th District: Jefferson and Lewis counties
- 36th District: Oneida County
- 37th District: Oswego and Madison counties
- 38th District: Onondaga County
- 39th District: Broome, Cortland and Tioga counties
- 40th District: Chemung, Schuyler and Tompkins counties
- 41st District: Cayuga, Seneca and Yates counties
- 42nd District: Ontario and Wayne counties
- 43rd District: Steuben and Allegany counties
- 44th District: Genesee, Livingston and Wyoming counties
- 45th and 46th District: Monroe County
- 47th District: Niagara and Orleans counties
- 48th, 49th and 50th District: Erie County
- 51st District: Cattaraugus and Chautauqua counties

=== Members ===
The asterisk (*) denotes members of the previous Legislature who continued in office as members of this Legislature.

District	Senator	Party	Notes
1st	Carll S. Burr Jr.*	Republican	
2nd	Dennis J. Harte*	Democrat	
3rd	Thomas H. Cullen*	Democrat	
4th	Otto G. Foelker*	Republican	on November 3, 1908, elected to the 60th U.S. Congress
5th	James A. Thompson*	Democrat	
6th	Eugene M. Travis*	Republican	
7th	Patrick H. McCarren*	Democrat	
8th	Charles H. Fuller*	Dem./Ind. L.	
9th	Conrad Hasenflug*	Democrat	
10th	Alfred J. Gilchrist*	Republican	
11th	Dominick F. Mullaney*	Dem./Ind. L.	
12th	William Sohmer*	Dem./Ind. L.	
13th	Christopher D. Sullivan*	Dem./Ind. L.	
14th	Thomas F. Grady*	Dem./Ind. L.	Minority Leader
15th	Thomas J. McManus*	Dem./Ind. L.	
16th	John T. McCall*	Dem./Ind. L.	
17th	George B. Agnew*	Republican	
18th	Martin Saxe*	Republican	
19th	Alfred R. Page*	Republican	
20th	James J. Frawley*	Dem./Ind. L.	
21st	James Owens*	Democrat	
22nd	John P. Cohalan*	Dem./Ind. L.	on November 3, 1908, elected Surrogate of New York Co.
23rd	Francis M. Carpenter*	Republican	
24th	John C. R. Taylor*	Democrat	
25th	Sanford W. Smith*	Republican	
26th	John N. Cordts*	Republican	
27th	Jotham P. Allds*	Republican	
28th	William J. Grattan*	Republican	
29th	Frank M. Boyce*	Democrat	
30th	H. Wallace Knapp*	Republican	
31st	William W. Wemple*	Republican	
32nd	James A. Emerson*	Republican	
33rd	Seth G. Heacock*	Republican	
34th	William T. O'Neil*	Republican	
35th	George H. Cobb*	Republican	
36th	Joseph Ackroyd*	Democrat	
37th	Francis H. Gates*	Ind. Rep.	
38th	Horace White*	Republican	on November 3, 1908, elected Lieutenant Governor
39th	Harvey D. Hinman*	Republican	
40th	Owen Cassidy*	Republican	
41st	Benjamin M. Wilcox*	Republican	
42nd	John Raines*	Republican	President pro tempore
43rd	William J. Tully*	Republican	
44th	S. Percy Hooker*	Republican	
45th	Thomas B. Dunn*	Republican	on November 3, 1908, elected New York State Treasurer
46th	William W. Armstrong*	Republican	
47th	Stanislaus P. Franchot*	Republican	died on March 24, 1908
47th	William C. Wallace	Republican	elected on May 12 to fill vacancy
48th	Henry W. Hill*	Republican	
49th	Samuel J. Ramsperger*	Democrat	
50th	George Allen Davis*	Republican	
51st	Albert T. Fancher*	Republican	

=== Employees ===
- Clerk: Lafayette B. Gleason

== State Assembly ==
Note: For brevity, the chairmanships mentioned omit the words "...the Committee on (the)..."

=== Assemblymen ===
District		Assemblymen	Party	Notes
Albany	1st	Ellis J. Staley	Republican	
Albany	2nd	William E. Nolan	Republican	
Albany	3rd	Robert B. Waters*	Republican	
Allegany		Jesse S. Phillips*	Republican	Chairman of Judiciary
Broome		Harry C. Perkins	Republican	
Cattaraugus		John J. Volk*	Republican	
Cayuga		Frederick A. Dudley*	Republican	Chairman of Soldiers' Home
Chautauqua	1st	Augustus F. Allen*	Republican	Chairman of Federal Relations
Chautauqua	2nd	Charles Mann Hamilton*	Republican	Chairman of Military Affairs
Chemung		David C. Robinson	Dem./Ind. L.	
Chenango		Julien C. Scott	Republican	
Clinton		Alonson T. Dominy*	Republican	
Columbia		Lester J. Bashford	Democrat	
Cortland		Charles F. Brown	Republican	
Delaware		Henry J. Williams	Republican	
Dutchess	1st	Myron Smith*	Republican	
Dutchess	2nd	Frederick Northrup*	Democrat	
Erie	1st	Orson J. Weimert*	Republican	Chairman of Indian Affairs
Erie	2nd	John Lord O'Brian*	Republican	
Erie	3rd	George J. Arnold	Republican	
Erie	4th	William Jordan	Democrat	
Erie	5th	Edward P. Costello	Democrat	
Erie	6th	Frank S. Burzynski*	Democrat	
Erie	7th	George W. Walters*	Democrat	
Erie	8th	Clarence MacGregor	Republican	
Erie	9th	Frank B. Thorn	Republican	
Essex		James Shea	Republican	
Franklin		Harry H. Hawley	Republican	
Fulton and Hamilton		William Ellison Mills*	Republican	Chairman of Fisheries and Game
Genesee		Fred B. Parker*	Republican	
Greene		William C. Brady*	Republican	Chairman of Villages
Herkimer		Thomas D. Ferguson*	Republican	
Jefferson	1st	Alfred D. Lowe*	Republican	Chairman of Public Lands and Forestry
Jefferson	2nd	Gary H. Wood*	Republican	
Kings	1st	Edmund R. Terry	Democrat	
Kings	2nd	James Jacobs	Democrat	
Kings	3rd	Arthur L. Hurley	Rep./Ind. L.	
Kings	4th	Andrew C. Troy	Democrat	
Kings	5th	Charles J. Weber*	Republican	
Kings	6th	Thomas J. Surpless*	Republican	
Kings	7th	Thomas J. Geoghegan*	Democrat	
Kings	8th	John McBride	Rep./Ind. L.	
Kings	9th	George A. Voss*	Rep./Ind. L.	
Kings	10th	Charles F. Murphy*	Republican	Chairman of Codes
Kings	11th	William W. Colne*	Republican	Chairman of Canals
Kings	12th	George A. Green*	Republican	Chairman of General Laws
Kings	13th	John H. Donnelly*	Democrat	
Kings	14th	James E. Fay	Democrat	
Kings	15th	John J. Schutta	Democrat	
Kings	16th	Michael J. Grady	Democrat	
Kings	17th	John R. Farrar	Republican	
Kings	18th	Warren I. Lee*	Rep./Ind. L.	
Kings	19th	John Holbrook	Rep./Ind. L.	
Kings	20th	Harrison C. Glore*	Republican	
Kings	21st	Samuel A. Gluck*	Democrat	
Kings	22nd	Emil Rose	Dem./Ind. L.	
Kings	23rd	Isaac Sargent	Republican	
Lewis		C. Fred Boshart*	Republican	Chairman of Agriculture
Livingston		James Wolcott Wadsworth Jr.*	Republican	re-elected Speaker; Chairman of Rules
Madison		Orlando W. Burhyte*	Republican	
Monroe	1st	George F. Harris*	Republican	
Monroe	2nd	James L. Whitley*	Republican	
Monroe	3rd	George L. Meade	Republican	
Monroe	4th	Bernard J. Haggarty	Republican	
Monroe	5th	Henry Morgan*	Republican	
Montgomery		T. Romeyn Staley*	Republican	
Nassau		William G. Miller*	Republican	Chairman of Commerce and Navigation
New York	1st	Thomas B. Caughlan	Democrat	
New York	2nd	Al Smith*	Democrat	
New York	3rd	James Oliver*	Democrat	
New York	4th	Aaron J. Levy	Democrat	
New York	5th	John T. Eagleton*	Democrat	
New York	6th	Adolph Stern*	Democrat	
New York	7th	Joseph W. Keller*	Democrat	
New York	8th	Moritz Graubard	Democrat	
New York	9th	John C. Hackett*	Democrat	
New York	10th	Anthony M. McCabe	Ind. L./Rep.	
New York	11th	Frank K. Johnston	Ind. L./Rep.	
New York	12th	James A. Foley*	Democrat	
New York	13th	James J. Hoey*	Democrat	
New York	14th	John J. Herrick	Democrat	
New York	15th	William M. Bennett	Rep./Ind. L.	
New York	16th	Martin G. McCue*	Democrat	
New York	17th	Frederick R. Toombs	Republican	
New York	18th	Mark Goldberg*	Democrat	
New York	19th	William B. Donihee	Democrat	
New York	20th	Patrick J. McGrath	Democrat	
New York	21st	Robert S. Conklin*	Republican	
New York	22nd	Robert F. Wagner*	Democrat	
New York	23rd	James A. Francis*	Republican	Chairman of Banks
New York	24th	Walter Spriggins	Democrat	
New York	25th	Artemas Ward Jr.	Republican	
New York	26th	Solomon Strauss	Rep./Ind. L.	
New York	27th	Beverley R. Robinson*	Rep./Ind. L.	
New York	28th	Edward W. Buckley*	Democrat	
New York	29th	Walter H. Liebmann	Democrat	
New York	30th	Louis A. Cuvillier*	Democrat	
New York	31st	Abraham Greenberg	Democrat	contested by Philip Reece
New York	32nd	Jesse Silbermann	Democrat	
New York	33rd	Phillip J. Schmidt*	Democrat	
New York	34th	George M. S. Schulz*	Democrat	
New York	35th	John V. Sheridan*	Democrat	
Niagara	1st	Charles F. Foley*	Democrat	
Niagara	2nd	W. Levell Draper*	Republican	Chairman of Privileges and Elections
Oneida	1st	Merwin K. Hart*	Republican	
Oneida	2nd	Ladd J. Lewis Jr.*	Republican	
Oneida	3rd	Arthur G. Blue*	Republican	
Onondaga	1st	John C. McLaughlin	Republican	
Onondaga	2nd	Fred W. Hammond*	Republican	Chairman of Affairs of Cities
Onondaga	3rd	J. Henry Walters	Republican	
Ontario		George B. Hemenway	Republican	
Orange	1st	Henry Seacord	Republican	
Orange	2nd	Charles E. Mance*	Republican	
Orleans		Myron E. Eggleston*	Dem./Ind. L.	
Oswego		Fred G. Whitney*	Republican	Chairman of Excise
Otsego		Charles Smith*	Republican	
Putnam		John R. Yale*	Republican	Chairman of Electricity, Gas and Water Supply
Queens	1st	Thomas H. Todd*	Democrat	
Queens	2nd	William Klein	Democrat	
Queens	3rd	Conrad Garbe*	Democrat	
Queens	4th	William A. De Groot*	Republican	Chairman of Claims
Rensselaer	1st	Frederick C. Filley*	Republican	Chairman of Public Education
Rensselaer	2nd	Bradford R. Lansing*	Republican	Chairman of Charitable and Religious Societies
Richmond		William A. Shortt	Democrat	
Rockland		Frank DeNoyelles	Democrat	
St. Lawrence	1st	Fred J. Gray*	Republican	Chairman of Revision
St. Lawrence	2nd	Edwin A. Merritt Jr.*	Republican	Majority Leader; Chairman of Ways and Means
Saratoga		George H. Whitney*	Republican	Chairman of Public Health
Schenectady		Miles R. Frisbie*	Republican	
Schoharie		George M. Palmer	Democrat	Minority Leader
Schuyler		Charles A. Cole*	Republican	
Seneca		William B. Harper*	Democrat	
Steuben	1st	William H. Chamberlain*	Republican	Chairman of Taxation and Retrenchment
Steuben	2nd	Charles K. Marlatt*	Republican	Chairman of Unfinished Business
Suffolk	1st	John M. Lupton*	Republican	Chairman of Public Institutions
Suffolk	2nd	Orlando Hubbs*	Republican	Chairman of Internal Affairs
Sullivan		George W. Murphy*	Republican	Chairman of Printed and Engrossed Bills
Tioga		Frank L. Howard	Republican	
Tompkins		William R. Gunderman*	Republican	Chairman of Trade and Manufactures
Ulster	1st	Joseph M. Fowler*	Republican	Chairman of Public Printing
Ulster	2nd	William E. E. Little	Democrat	
Warren		William R. Waddell*	Republican	Chairman of State Prisons
Washington		James S. Parker	Republican	Chairman of Labor and Industries
Wayne		Edson W. Hamn*	Republican	Chairman of Insurance
Westchester	1st	Harry W. Haines*	Republican	
Westchester	2nd	Marmaduke B. Wright	Democrat	
Westchester	3rd	Isaac H. Smith	Republican	
Westchester	4th	J. Mayhew Wainwright*	Republican	Chairman of Railroads
Wyoming		Robert M. McFarlane	Republican	
Yates		Leonidas D. West*	Republican	

=== Employees ===
- Clerk: Ray B. Smith
- Sergeant-at-Arms: Frank W. Johnston
- Stenographer: Henry C. Lammert
- Postoffice Messenger: James H. Underwood

== Sources ==
- Official New York from Cleveland to Hughes by Charles Elliott Fitch (Hurd Publishing Co., New York and Buffalo, 1911, Vol. IV; see pg. 355f for assemblymen; and 366 for senators)
- DEMOCRATS GAIN SIX ASSEMBLYMEN in NYT on November 6, 1907
- REVISED LIST OF ASSEMBLYMEN in Johnstown Republican on November 14, 1907
- ASSEMBLY MACHINE RIDES OVER BAXTER in NYT on January 1, 1908
- WADSWORTH NAMES HIS COMMITTEES in NYT on January 7, 1908
- GOVERNOR HISSED, CALLS EXTRA SESSION in NYT on April 24, 1908
