= 134th New York State Legislature =

New York state legislative session

←	133rd	135th	→
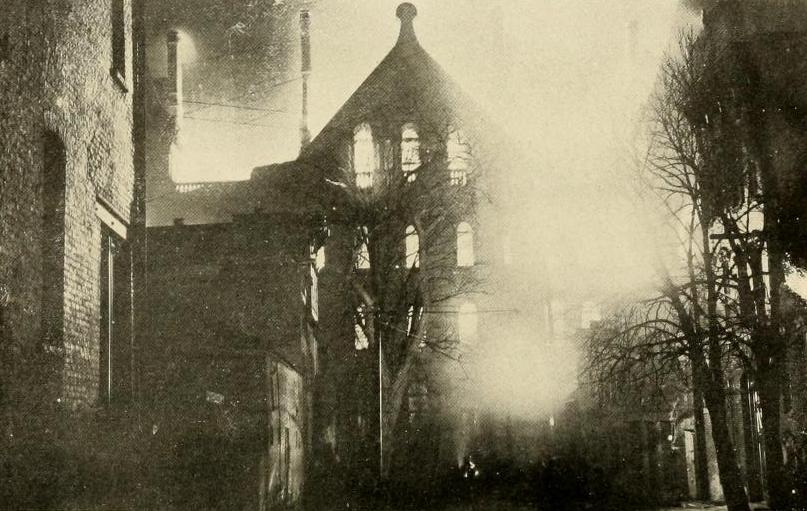
- The State Capitol on fire during the early morning of March 29. (1911)

Overview
- Legislative body: New York State Legislature
- Jurisdiction: New York, United States
- Term: January 1 – December 31, 1911

Senate
- Members: 51
- President: Lt. Gov. Thomas F. Conway (D)
- Temporary President: Robert F. Wagner (D)
- Party control: Democratic (30-21)

Assembly
- Members: 150
- Speaker: Daniel D. Frisbie (D)
- Party control: Democratic (87-63)

Sessions
- 1st: January 4 – October 6, 1911

The 134th New York State Legislature, consisting of the New York State Senate and the New York State Assembly, met from January 4 to October 6, 1911, during the first year of John Alden Dix's governorship, in Albany.

== Background ==
Under the provisions of the New York Constitution of 1894, re-apportioned in 1906 and 1907, 51 Senators and 150 assemblymen were elected in single-seat districts; senators for a two-year term, assemblymen for a one-year term. The senatorial districts were made up of entire counties, except New York County (twelve districts), Kings County (eight districts), Erie County (three districts) and Monroe County (two districts). The Assembly districts were made up of contiguous area, all within the same county.

At this time there were two major political parties: the Republican Party and the Democratic Party. The Socialist Party, the Independence League, the Prohibition Party and the Socialist Labor Party also nominated tickets.

== Elections ==
The 1910 New York state election, was held on November 8. John Alden Dix and Thomas F. Conway were elected Governor and Lieutenant Governor; both Democrats. Of the other seven statewide elective offices up for election, five were carried by the Democrats, and two cross-endorsed incumbent judges of the Court of Appeals were re-elected. The approximate party strength at this election, as expressed by the vote for governor, was: Democrats 690,000; Republicans 622,000; Socialists 49,000; Independence League 48,000; Prohibition 22,000; and Socialist Labor 6,000.

== Sessions ==
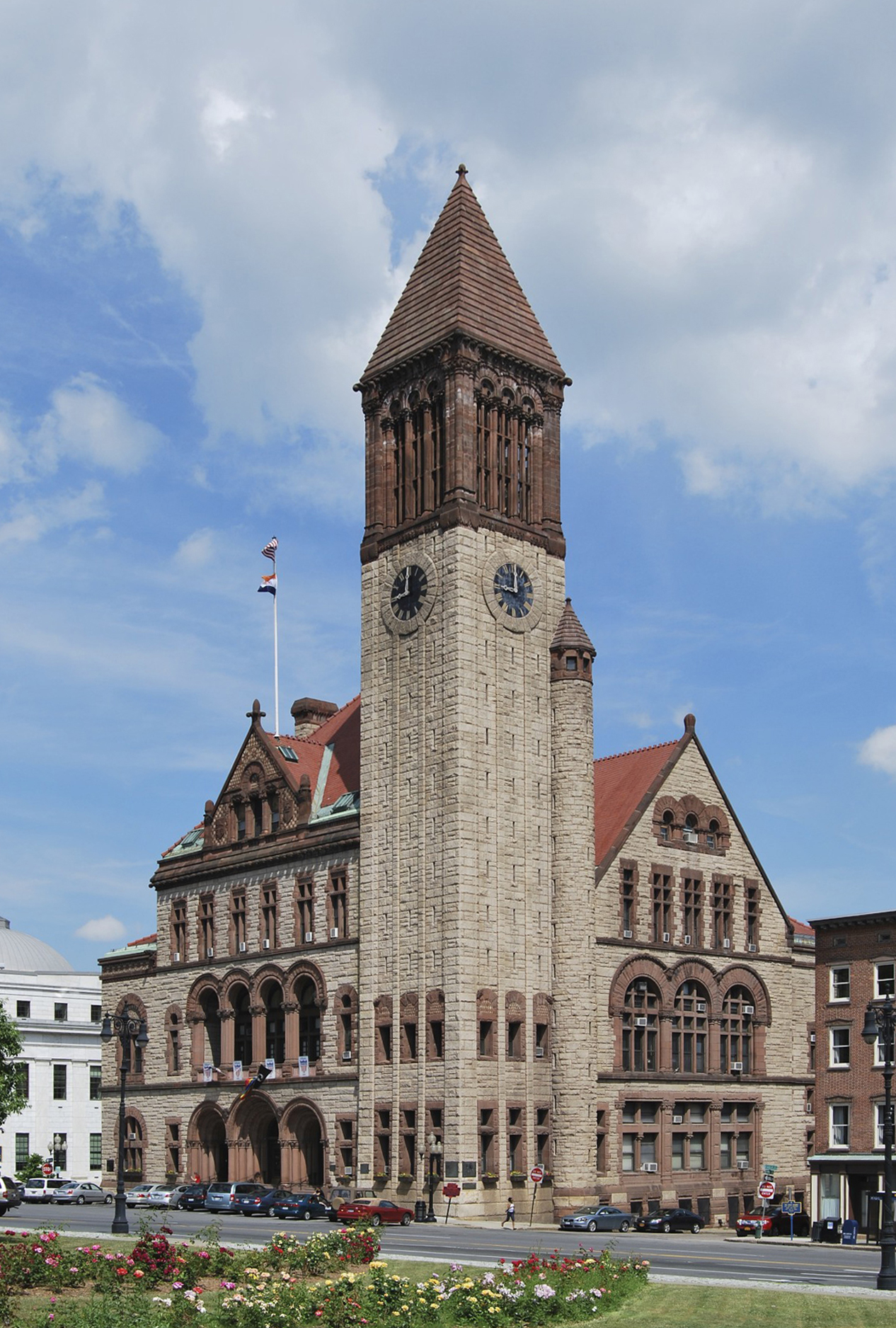
The Albany City Hall, where the Legislature met for a few days after the fire

The Legislature met for the regular session at the State Capitol in Albany on January 4, 1911; and adjourned on October 6.

Daniel D. Frisbie (D) was elected Speaker with 84 votes against 62 for Edwin A. Merritt Jr. (R).

Robert F. Wagner (D) was elected president pro tempore of the State Senate.

On January 17, the Legislature began proceedings to elect a U.S. Senator from New York for a six-year term beginning on March 4, 1911.

On January 19, Governor of Minnesota Adolph Olson Eberhart addressed the members of the Assembly.

On February 6, Ex-Governor of North Carolina Robert Broadnax Glenn addressed the members of the Assembly.

On February 7, the Legislature elected Abram I. Elkus to succeed Edward Lauterbach as a Regent of the University of the State of New York, for a twelve-year term beginning on April 1, 1911.

On February 8, Daniel E. Sickles, at the time the oldest living former assemblyman (a member in 1847), addressed the members of the Assembly.

On March 9, UK Ambassador to the U.S. James Bryce addressed the members of the Senate and Assembly.

During the small hours of March 29, a fire broke out in the New York State Capitol, consuming most of the West Wing, and destroying almost completely the State Library and Archives. The Legislature moved to temporary quarters in the Albany City Hall.

On March 31, after 74 days of deadlock, the Legislature elected New York Supreme Court Justice James A. O'Gorman (D) to succeed U.S. Senator Chauncey M. Depew (R). Afterwards the Legislature took a recess of two weeks while the Capitol was being repaired.

On April 17, the Legislature met again at the State Capitol to resume the legislative business which had been delayed by the deadlocked U.S. Senate election.

On July 21, the Legislature took a recess, and met again on September 6. Clerk of the Assembly Luke McHenry had become ill, and George R. Van Namee was designated to act as Clerk. McHenry died on September 17, and Van Namee was chosen to succeed to the clerkship.

== State Senate ==
=== Districts ===
- 1st District: Nassau and Suffolk counties
- 2nd District: Queens County, i.e the Borough of Queens
- 3rd, 4th, 5th, 6th, 7th, 8th, 9th and 10th District: Parts of Kings County, i.e. the Borough of Brooklyn
- 11th, 12th, 13th, 14th, 15th, 16th, 17th, 18th, 19th, 20th, 21st and 22nd District: Parts of New York County, i.e. the boroughs of Manhattan and the Bronx
- 23rd District: Richmond and Rockland counties
- 24th District: Westchester County
- 25th District: Orange and Sullivan counties
- 26th District: Columbia, Dutchess and Putnam counties
- 27th District: Greene and Ulster counties
- 28th District: Albany County
- 29th District: Rensselaer County
- 30th District: Saratoga and Washington counties
- 31st District: Montgomery, Schenectady and Schoharie counties
- 32nd District: Lewis, Fulton, Hamilton and Herkimer counties
- 33rd District: Clinton, Essex and Warren counties
- 34th District: Franklin and St. Lawrence counties
- 35th District: Jefferson and Oswego counties
- 36th District: Oneida County
- 37th District: Chenango, Madison and Otsego counties
- 38th District: Onondaga County
- 39th District: Broome and Delaware counties
- 40th District: Cayuga, Cortland and Seneca counties
- 41st District: Chemung, Schuyler, Tioga and Tompkins counties
- 42nd District: Ontario, Wayne and Yates counties
- 43rd District: Steuben and Livingston counties
- 44th District: Allegany, Genesee and Wyoming counties
- 45th and 46th District: Monroe County
- 47th District: Niagara and Orleans counties
- 48th, 49th and 50th District: Erie County
- 51st District: Cattaraugus and Chautauqua counties

=== Members ===
The asterisk (*) denotes members of the previous Legislature who continued in office as members of this Legislature. Felix J. Sanner, Loren H. White and J. Henry Walters changed from the Assembly to the Senate.

District	Senator	Party	Notes
1st	James L. Long	Democrat	
2nd	Dennis J. Harte*	Democrat	re-elected
3rd	Thomas H. Cullen*	Democrat	re-elected
4th	Loring M. Black Jr.	Democrat	
5th	Barth S. Cronin*	Democrat	re-elected
6th	Eugene M. Travis*	Republican	re-elected
7th	Thomas C. Harden*	Democrat	re-elected
8th	James F. Duhamel	Ind. L./Dem.	
9th	Felix J. Sanner*	Democrat	
10th	James H. O'Brien	Democrat	
11th	Christopher D. Sullivan*	Democrat	re-elected
12th	Timothy D. Sullivan*	Democrat	re-elected
13th	James D. McClelland	Democrat	
14th	Thomas F. Grady*	Democrat	re-elected
15th	Thomas J. McManus*	Democrat	re-elected
16th	Robert F. Wagner*	Democrat	re-elected; elected president pro tempore
17th	John G. Saxe	Democrat	
18th	Henry W. Pollock	Democrat	
19th	Josiah T. Newcomb*	Republican	re-elected
20th	James J. Frawley*	Democrat	re-elected
21st	Stephen J. Stilwell*	Democrat	re-elected
22nd	Anthony J. Griffin	Democrat	
23rd	Howard R. Bayne*	Democrat	re-elected
24th	J. Mayhew Wainwright*	Republican	re-elected
25th	John B. Rose*	Republican	re-elected
26th	Franklin D. Roosevelt	Democrat	
27th	William P. Fiero	Democrat	
28th	Henry M. Sage	Republican	
29th	Victor M. Allen*	Republican	re-elected
30th	Edgar T. Brackett*	Republican	re-elected; Minority Leader
31st	Loren H. White*	Democrat	
32nd	Seth G. Heacock*	Republican	re-elected
33rd	James A. Emerson*	Republican	re-elected
34th	Herbert P. Coats*	Republican	re-elected
35th	George H. Cobb*	Republican	re-elected
36th	T. Harvey Ferris	Democrat	
37th	Ralph W. Thomas*	Republican	re-elected
38th	J. Henry Walters*	Republican	
39th	Harvey D. Hinman*	Republican	re-elected
40th	Charles J. Hewitt*	Republican	re-elected
41st	John F. Murtaugh	Democrat	
42nd	Frederick W. Griffith*	Republican	re-elected
43rd	Frank C. Platt*	Republican	re-elected
44th	Thomas H. Bussey	Republican	
45th	George F. Argetsinger	Republican	
46th	William L. Ormrod	Republican	
47th	Robert H. Gittins	Democrat	
48th	Frank M. Loomis	Democrat	
49th	Samuel J. Ramsperger*	Democrat	re-elected
50th	George B. Burd	Democrat	
51st	Charles Mann Hamilton*	Republican	re-elected

=== Employees ===
- Clerk: Patrick E. McCabe
- Sergeant-at-Arms: James McMahon
- Assistant Sergeant-at-Arms: August Gerritson
- Principal Doorkeeper: Fred W. Theobold
- Assistant Doorkeeper: Thomas Nolan
- Stenographer: William E. Reynolds

== State Assembly ==
Note: For brevity, the chairmanships omit the words "...the Committee on (the)..."

=== Assemblymen ===
District		Assemblymen	Party	Notes
Albany	1st	Harold J. Hinman*	Republican	
Albany	2nd	William E. Nolan*	Republican	
Albany	3rd	Robert B. Waters*	Republican	unsuccessfully contested by John W. Kenny
Allegany		Jesse S. Phillips*	Republican	
Broome		Charles S. Butler	Republican	
Cattaraugus		Ellsworth J. Cheney*	Republican	
Cayuga		Nelson L. Drummond	Democrat	
Chautauqua	1st	Julius Lincoln	Republican	
Chautauqua	2nd	John Leo Sullivan*	Republican	
Chemung		Robert P. Bush	Democrat	Chairman of Public Health
Chenango		Walter A. Shepardson*	Republican	
Clinton		John B. Trombly*	Democrat	Chairman of Penal Institutions
Columbia		Randall N. Saunders	Democrat	
Cortland		Charles F. Brown*	Republican	
Delaware		Clayton L. Wheeler	Democrat	
Dutchess	1st	Ferdinand A. Hoyt	Democrat	
Dutchess	2nd	Lewis Stuyvesant Chanler*	Democrat	Chairman of Codes
Erie	1st	James S. Dawson	Democrat	
Erie	2nd	Oliver G. La Reau	Democrat	
Erie	3rd	Leo J. Neupert*	Democrat	Chairman of Printed and Engrossed Bills
Erie	4th	Edward D. Jackson*	Democrat	
Erie	5th	Richard F. Hearn*	Democrat	
Erie	6th	Anthony H. Monczynski	Democrat	
Erie	7th	Gottfried H. Wende*	Democrat	Chairman of Labor and Industries
Erie	8th	Clarence MacGregor*	Republican	
Erie	9th	Frank B. Thorn*	Republican	
Essex		James Shea*	Republican	
Franklin		Alexander Macdonald*	Republican	
Fulton and Hamilton		Alden Hart	Republican	
Genesee		Clarence Bryant	Republican	
Greene		J. Lewis Patrie*	Democrat	Chairman of Public Education
Herkimer		Judson Bridenbecker	Democrat	
Jefferson	1st	Lewis W. Day	Democrat	
Jefferson	2nd	John G. Jones	Republican	
Kings	1st	Edmund R. Terry	Democrat	Chairman of Claims
Kings	2nd	William J. Gillen*	Democrat	
Kings	3rd	Michael A. O'Neil*	Democrat	Chairman of Banks
Kings	4th	Clarence W. Donovan	Democrat	
Kings	5th	Abraham F. Lent	Republican	
Kings	6th	John H. Gerken*	Democrat	
Kings	7th	Daniel F. Farrell*	Democrat	
Kings	8th	John J. McKeon*	Democrat	
Kings	9th	Edmund O'Connor*	Ind. L./Dem.	abstained from voting for Speaker; Chairman of Public Institutions
Kings	10th	Fred M. Ahern	Republican	
Kings	11th	William W. Colne*	Republican	
Kings	12th	Sydney W. Fry	Democrat	
Kings	13th	John H. Donnelly*	Democrat	
Kings	14th	James E. Fay*	Democrat	Chairman of Electricity, Gas and Water Supply
Kings	15th	John J. O'Neill*	Democrat	Chairman of Charitable and Religious Societies
Kings	16th	John F. Jameson	Democrat	
Kings	17th	Edward A. Ebbets*	Republican	
Kings	18th	Almeth W. Hoff	Republican	
Kings	19th	Jacob Schifferdecker	Democrat	
Kings	20th	George F. Carew	Democrat	
Kings	21st	Harry Heyman	Democrat	
Kings	22nd	Joseph T. Geatons	Democrat	
Kings	23rd	Louis Goldstein	Democrat	
Lewis		Robert E. Gregg	Democrat	
Livingston		John C. Winters Jr.	Republican	
Madison		Kirk B. Delano*	Republican	
Monroe	1st	Edward H. White*	Republican	
Monroe	2nd	Simon L. Adler	Republican	
Monroe	3rd	August V. Pappert	Republican	
Monroe	4th	Cyrus W. Phillips*	Republican	
Monroe	5th	William T. Keys	Republican	
Montgomery		Richard A. Brace	Democrat	
Nassau		Henry A. Hollmann	Democrat	
New York	1st	Thomas B. Caughlan*	Democrat	Chairman of Railroads
New York	2nd	Al Smith*	Democrat	Majority Leader; Chairman of Ways and Means
New York	3rd	James Oliver*	Democrat	died on September 18, 1911
New York	4th	Aaron J. Levy*	Democrat	Chairman of Judiciary
New York	5th	Jimmy Walker*	Democrat	
New York	6th	Harry Kopp*	Republican	unsuccessfully contested by Sol H. Eisler
New York	7th	Peter P. McElligott*	Democrat	
New York	8th	Moritz Graubard*	Democrat	Chairman of Public Printing
New York	9th	John C. Hackett*	Democrat	Chairman of Excise
New York	10th	Harold Spielberg*	Democrat	unsuccessfully contested by Jacob Kostman
New York	11th	John J. Boylan*	Democrat	
New York	12th	James A. Foley*	Democrat	Chairman of Affairs of Cities
New York	13th	James J. Hoey*	Democrat	Chairman of Insurance
New York	14th	John J. Herrick*	Democrat	
New York	15th	Ashton Parker	Democrat	
New York	16th	Martin G. McCue*	Democrat	Chairman of Commerce and Navigation
New York	17th	Franklin Brooks	Republican	
New York	18th	Mark Goldberg*	Democrat	Chairman of Taxation and Retrenchment
New York	19th	Andrew F. Murray*	Republican	
New York	20th	Patrick J. McGrath*	Democrat	Chairman of Revision
New York	21st	Joseph A. Warren	Democrat	
New York	22nd	Edward Weil	Democrat	
New York	23rd	Frederick A. Higgins*	Republican	
New York	24th	Thomas A. Brennan*	Democrat	Chairman of Privileges and Elections
New York	25th	Artemas Ward Jr.*	Republican	
New York	26th	Abram Goodman	Republican	
New York	27th	Walter R. Herrick	Democrat	
New York	28th	Jacob Levy*	Democrat	
New York	29th	Harold J. Friedman	Democrat	
New York	30th	Louis A. Cuvillier	Democrat	Chairman of Military Affairs
New York	31st	Max Shlivek	Republican	
New York	32nd	Thomas F. Turley	Democrat	
New York	33rd	John Gerhardt*	Democrat	
New York	34th	Seymour Mork	Democrat	
New York	35th	Thomas F. Egan	Democrat	
Niagara	1st	Benjamin F. Gould	Democrat	
Niagara	2nd	Henry A. Constantine	Republican	
Oneida	1st	John W. Manley*	Democrat	Chairman of Canals
Oneida	2nd	Herbert E. Allen*	Republican	
Oneida	3rd	James T. Cross*	Republican	
Onondaga	1st	James E. Connell*	Republican	
Onondaga	2nd	Fred W. Hammond	Republican	
Onondaga	3rd	Thomas K. Smith	Republican	
Ontario		Thomas B. Wilson	Republican	
Orange	1st	Caleb H. Baumes*	Republican	
Orange	2nd	John D. Stivers*	Republican	
Orleans		Frank A. Waters	Republican	
Oswego		Thaddeus C. Sweet*	Republican	
Otsego		Chester A. Miller	Democrat	
Putnam		John R. Yale*	Republican	
Queens	1st	Andrew Zorn*	Democrat	
Queens	2nd	Alfred J. Kennedy	Democrat	
Queens	3rd	Owen E. Fitzpatrick	Democrat	
Queens	4th	Harry I. Huber	Democrat	
Rensselaer	1st	Frederick C. Filley*	Republican	
Rensselaer	2nd	Bradford R. Lansing*	Republican	
Richmond		William A. Shortt*	Democrat	Chairman of General Laws
Rockland		George A. Blauvelt	Democrat	
St. Lawrence	1st	Fred J. Gray*	Republican	
St. Lawrence	2nd	Edwin A. Merritt Jr.*	Republican	Minority Leader
Saratoga		William M. Martin	Democrat	Chairman of Affairs of Villages
Schenectady		John C. Myers	Democrat	
Schoharie		Daniel D. Frisbie*	Democrat	elected Speaker; Chairman of Rules
Schuyler		John W. Gurnett	Democrat	Chairman of Forestry, Fisheries and Game
Seneca		Charles W. Cosad*	Democrat	Chairman of Agriculture
Steuben	1st	Thomas Shannon	Republican	
Steuben	2nd	John Seeley	Democrat	Chairman of Soldiers' Home
Suffolk	1st	DeWitt C. Talmage	Republican	
Suffolk	2nd	Frederick Sheide	Democrat	
Sullivan		John K. Evans*	Democrat	Chairman of Internal Affairs
Tioga		Otis S. Beach	Democrat	
Tompkins		Minor McDaniels	Democrat	
Ulster	1st	George Washburn	Democrat	
Ulster	2nd	Samuel C. Waring	Republican	
Warren		Henry E. H. Brereton	Republican	
Washington		James S. Parker*	Republican	
Wayne		Albert Yeomans	Republican	
Westchester	1st	Harry W. Haines*	Republican	
Westchester	2nd	William S. Coffey*	Republican	
Westchester	3rd	Frank L. Young*	Republican	
Westchester	4th	John A. Goodwin*	Republican	
Wyoming		Henry A. Pierce	Republican	
Yates		Frank M. Collin	Democrat	

=== Employees ===
- Clerk: Luke McHenry, died September 17
  - George R. Van Namee, acting from September 6
- Sergeant-at-Arms: Lee F. Betts
- Principal Doorkeeper: Joseph Hurley, until January 24
  - Peter J. O'Neil, from January 24
- First Assistant Doorkeeper: Edward Bourne
- Second Assistant Doorkeeper: Edward Murphy
- Stenographer: Josiah B. Everts

== Sources ==
- Official New York from Cleveland to Hughes by Charles Elliott Fitch (Hurd Publishing Co., New York and Buffalo, 1911, Vol. IV; see pg. 360f for assemblymen; and 367 for senators)
- Journal of the Assembly (134th Session) (1911; Vol. I, until March 29)
- Journal of the Assembly (134th Session) (1911; Vol. II, from March 29)
- DEMOCRATS CONTROL LEGISLATURE BY 29 in NYT on November 10, 1910
- WAGNER IS LEADER; GRADY STAYS AWAY in NYT on January 4, 1911
- LEGISLATURE MEETS; HEARS DIX MESSAGE in NYT on January 5, 1911
- LEGISLATORS MEET IN A DAMP CAPITOL in NYT on April 18, 1911
- LEGISLATURE RESTS; PRIMARIES BILL LOST in NYT on July 22, 1911
- LEGISLATORS RIOTOUS OVER PRIMARIES BILL in NYT on October 1, 1911
- PASS PRIMARIES BILL AS LEGISLATURE ENDS in NYT on October 7, 1911
