= Senator Joseph =

Senator Joseph may refer to:

- George W. Joseph (1872–1930), Oregon State Senate
- Irving J. Joseph (1881–1943), New York State Senate
- Lazarus Joseph (1891–1966), New York State Senate
