= Loren White =

Loren White may refer to:

- Bob White (fullback) (Loren Robert White), American football player
- Loren H. White (1863–1923), American politician from New York
