= Thomas B. Caughlan =

American politician (1856–1938)

Thomas Byron Caughlan (September 11, 1856 – December 19, 1938) was an American politician from New York.

== Life ==
Caughlan was born on September 11, 1856, in New York City. After he graduated school he worked as a commercial traveller in the fruit and produce trade. In 1889, he began working in the brokerage commission business.

In 1903, Caughlan was elected to the New York State Assembly as a Democrat, representing the New York County 1st District. He served in the Assembly in 1904, 1905, 1906, 1908, 1909, 1910, 1911, 1912, 1913, and 1914. While in the Assembly, he roomed with and befriended Alfred E. Smith, who began his legislative career at the same time as Caughlan. After he left the Assembly, he worked as a switchboard operator for the Port of New York Authority.

Caughlan's children were Olive, Lester, and Walter B.

Caughlan died on December 19, 1938. He was buried in Calvary Cemetery.

New York State Assembly
Preceded by Andrew J. Doyle	New York State Assembly; New York County, 1st District; 1904-1906	Succeeded by James F. Cavanaugh
Preceded by James F. Cavanaugh	New York State Assembly; New York County, 1st District; 1908-1914	Succeeded by John J. Ryan (New York politician)
