= John H. Donnelly =

American politician

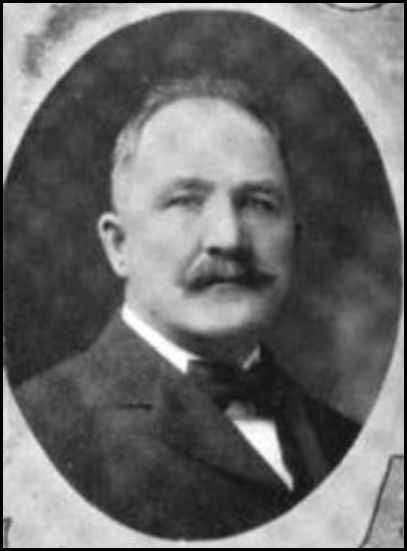
John H. Donnelly (1911)

John Henry Donnelly (May 11, 1857 – November 1, 1926) was an assistant warden, a realtor, an American politician, and Superintendent of Records.

== Life ==
He was born on May 11, 1857, in New Jersey, but his parents moved to New York when he was an infant and so he lived most of his life in New York City and Brooklyn. He attended Public School No. 51 of New York City.

He entered politics as a Democrat. He was a member of the New York State Assembly (Kings Co., 13th D.) in 1907, 1908, 1909, 1910 and 1911; and was member of the following committees: Taxation and Retrenchment and Public Printing in 1908 and 1909; Cities and Public Printing in 1910; Ways and Mean, Affairs of Cities, Insurance, Public Printing and Rules in 1911.

In 1911, he married Marie A. Garcia.

He was, at the time of his death, chief aide of Congressman George W. Lindsay, the Democratic leader. He died in his Brooklyn home at No. 241 Withers Street.

New York State Assembly
Preceded by Samuel J. Palmer	New York State Assembly; Kings County, 13th District; 1907–1911	Succeeded by Charles Schmitt
