= William S. Coffey =

American politician (1883–1958)

William Shipley Coffey (October 27, 1883 – December 25, 1958) was an American lawyer, politician, and judge from New York.

== Life ==
Coffey was born on October 27, 1883, in Eastchester, New York, the son of Rev. William Samuel Coffey and Henrietta Kellogg. His father was the rector of Saint Paul's Church in Eastchester.

Coffey attended Trinity School in New York City. He then attended the Mount Vernon High School, graduating from there in 1902. Later that year, he went to New York University, graduating from there with a B.A. in 1906. He then went to New York University Law School, graduating from there with an LL.B. in 1907. He was admitted to the bar later that year, and in 1908 he was admitted as a solicitor and advocate in the United States District Courts. In the latter year, he opened a law office in Mount Vernon. In 1920, he moved his office to New York City. After Francis A. Winslow was appointed a United States Judge, Coffey formed a firm with Winslow's former partner called Budd & Coffey.

Coffey was a General Committee Clerk in the New York State Senate in 1909. He also served as secretary to State Senator J. Mayhew Wainwright in 1909. Later that year, he was elected to the New York State Assembly as a Republican, representing the Westchester County 2nd District. He served in the Assembly in 1910, 1911, 1912, 1915, 1916, and 1917. In 1917, he was appointed secretary of the State Industrial Board. He worked as secretary from 1918 to 1919. In 1924, he was appointed Acting City Judge of Mount Vernon. He served as judge until 1932, when he was elected Westchester County Treasurer. He served as Treasurer until 1939, when the office was abolished.

Coffey was a member of the Republican County Committee, secretary of the Republican City Committee of Mount Vernon, and president of the Mount Vernon High School Alumni Association. He was a member of Delta Upsilon, the Elks, and the 10th Regiment of the New York National Guard. He attended St. Paul's Protestant Episcopal Church. In 1912, he married Alice Becker of Kingston.

Coffey died from a heart attack while waiting for a train in the Larchmont station on December 25, 1958. He was buried in Saint Paul's Church Cemetery in Mount Vernon.

New York State Assembly
Preceded by Holland S. Duell	New York State Assembly; Westchester County, 2nd District; 1910–1912	Succeeded by Verne Morgan Bovie
Preceded by August L. Martin	New York State Assembly; Westchester County, 2nd District; 1915–1917	Succeeded by William J. Fallon
