= George M. S. Schulz =

American politician

George M.S. Schulz
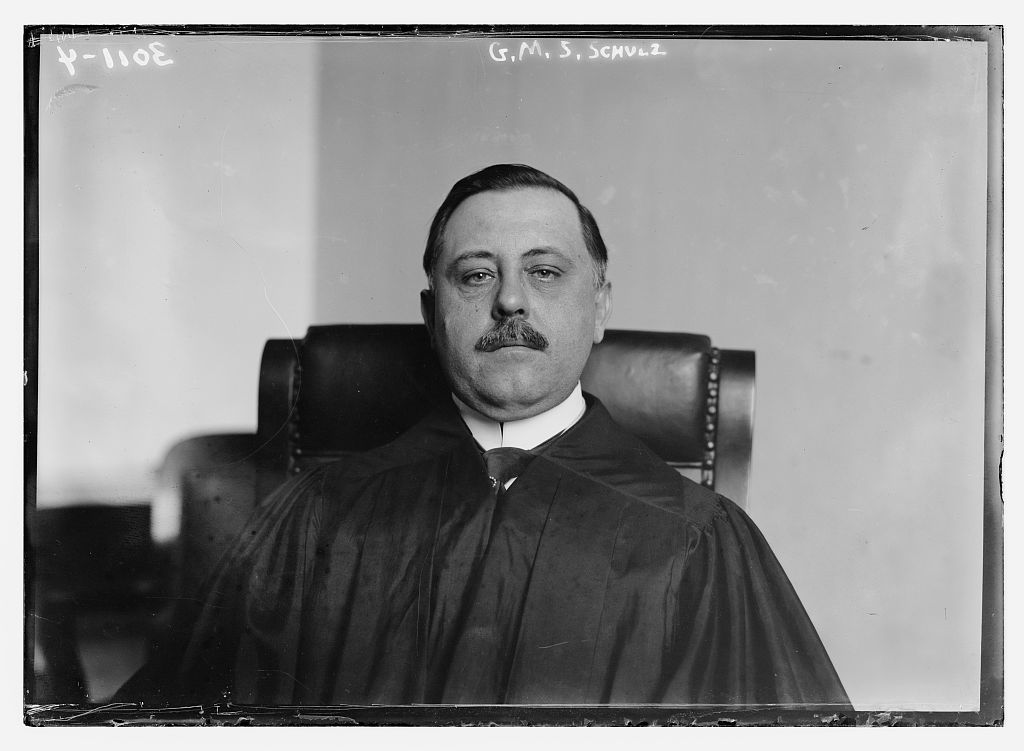
- Born: February 17, 1871; New York City
- Died: April 7, 1930 (aged 59); The Bronx
- Education: New York Law School
- Spouse: Anna Alice Mitchel
- Children: a son

George M.S. Schulz (February 17, 1871 – April 7, 1930) was a surrogate court judge and a member of both houses of the New York State Legislature.

== Biography ==
He was born in 1871 and graduated from the New York Law School in 1894 and was allowed to the bar in the same year. He married Anna Alice Mitchel on December 27, 1898, and they had at least one son.

He was a member of the New York State Assembly (New York Co., 34th D.) in 1907 and 1908; and of the New York State Senate (22nd D.) in 1909 and 1910.

New York State Assembly
Preceded by Charles Campbell	New York State Assembly; New York County, 34th District; 1907–1908	Succeeded by Charles Stein
New York State Senate
Preceded by John P. Cohalan	New York State Senate; 22nd District; 1909–1910	Succeeded by Anthony J. Griffin
