= Herbert P. Coats =

American politician

Herbert Philip Coats (September 1, 1872 in Fulton, Oswego County, New York – December 9, 1932 in Mount Vernon, Westchester County, New York) was an American lawyer and politician from New York and Puerto Rico.

== Life ==
He was the son of William H. Coats and Emma (Guernsey) Coats. He attended the public schools, and graduated from Albany Law School. He was admitted to the bar in 1894, and practiced in Saranac Lake, Franklin County, New York.

Coats was a member of the New York State Senate (34th D.) from 1910 to 1914, sitting in the 133rd, 134th, 135th, 136th and 137th New York State Legislature.

He was appointed as Attorney General of Puerto Rico in 1923, and remained in office until May 1925. Afterwards he practiced law in New York City, and was a partner in the law firm of Tomlinson, Herrick, Hoppin & Coats.

He died on December 9, 1932, at his home at 220 Central Parkway in Mount Vernon, New York.

== Sources ==
- Official New York from Cleveland to Hughes by Charles Elliott Fitch (Hurd Publishing Co., New York and Buffalo, 1911, Vol. IV; pg. 367)
- New York Red Book (1913, pg. 88)
- COATS GETS DELEGATES in NYT on May 1, 1910
- HERBERT P. COATS; Former Attorney General of Puerto Rico Dies in NYT on December 10, 1932 (subscription required)

New York State Senate
Preceded by William T. O'Neil	New York State Senate; 34th District; 1910–1914	Succeeded by N. Monroe Marshall
Legal offices
Preceded by Salvador Mestre	Attorney General of Puerto Rico; 1923–1925	Succeeded by George C. Butte
