= George B. Agnew =

American politician

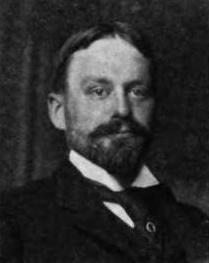
George B. Agnew (1903)

George Bliss Agnew (1868 – June 21, 1941) was an American politician from New York.

== Life ==
He graduated from Princeton University in 1891.

Agnew was a member of the New York State Assembly (New York Co., 27th D.) in 1903, 1904, 1905 and 1906.

He was a member of the New York State Senate (17th D.) from 1907 to 1910, sitting in the 130th, 131st, 132nd and 133rd New York State Legislatures.

In 1908, he co-sponsored, with Assemblyman Merwin K. Hart, the Hart–Agnew Law, an anti-horse-race-track-gambling bill which led to a total shutdown of horse-racing in the State of New York.

Agnew was defeated by John G. Saxe II in the November 8, 1910, election in a district that was Republican by a great majority. He died from pneumonia in New York in 1941.

New York State Assembly
| Preceded by Gherardi Davis | New York State Assembly; New York County, 27th District; 1903–1906 | Succeeded by Beverley R. Robinson |
New York State Senate
| Preceded by Martin Saxe | New York State Senate; 17th District; 1907–1910 | Succeeded by John G. Saxe |
