= John N. Cordts =

American politician

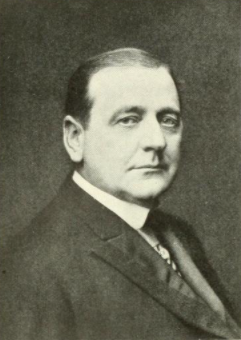

New York State Senate
- In office 1909–1910
- Constituency: 27th District
- In office 1907–1908
- Constituency: 26th District
- In office 1905–1906
- Constituency: 25th District

Personal details
- Born: John Nicholas Cordts; August 17, 1867 Kingston, New York
- Died: July 2, 1913 (aged 45) Kingston, New York
- Party: Republican
- Spouse: Matilda Loretta Stock (m. 1893)
- Occupation: Manufacturer, politician

John Nicholas Cordts (August 17, 1867 – July 2, 1913) was an American politician from New York.

== Life ==
John N. Cordts was born in Kingston, New York, the son of John H. Cordts. He attended the public schools, and then engaged with his father in the manufacture of brick.

On June 21, 1893, he married Matilda Loretta Stock, and later engaged with his brother-in-law in the sale of furniture.

He was a presidential elector in 1900, voting for William McKinley and Theodore Roosevelt.

Cordts was a member of the New York State Senate from 1905 to 1910, sitting in the 128th, 129th (both 25th D.), 130th, 131st (both 26th D.), 132nd and 133rd New York State Legislatures (both 27th D.).

He died at his home in Kingston on July 2, 1913.

== Sources ==
- Official New York from Cleveland to Hughes by Charles Elliott Fitch (Hurd Publishing Co., New York and Buffalo, 1911, Vol. IV; pg. 366)
- "Weddings Yesterday; Cordts — Stock" in NYT on June 22, 1893
- "Ulster and Greene May Go Democratic" in NYT on October 26, 1910

New York State Senate
Preceded by Frank J. Lefevre	New York State Senate; 25th District; 1905–1906	Succeeded by Sanford W. Smith
Preceded by Jotham P. Allds	New York State Senate; 26th District; 1907–1908	Succeeded by John F. Schlosser
Preceded by Jotham P. Allds	New York State Senate; 27th District; 1909–1910	Succeeded by William P. Fiero
