= William Allaire Shortt =

American politician

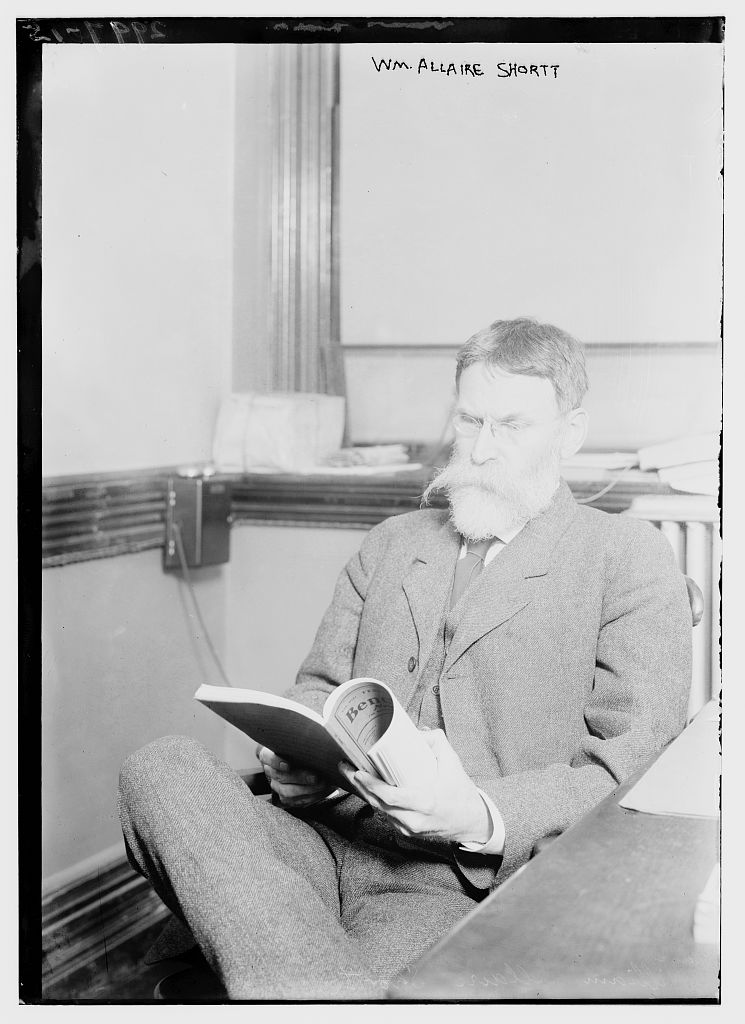
- Born: August 15, 1859; Florence, Massachusetts
- Died: March 9, 1915 (aged 55); Tompkinsville, Staten Island
- Education: University of Toronto
- Political party: Democrat

William Allaire Shortt (August 15, 1859 – March 9, 1915), was a Democrat, who represented Richmond County, New York in the New York State Assembly.

== Biography ==
He was born in Florence, Massachusetts, on August 15, 1859. He graduated from the University of Toronto in 1880. He then attended New York University Law School and was admitted to the bar in 1882.

He was a member of the New York State Assembly representing Richmond County, New York in 1908, 1910 and 1911.

He died at his home at 218 St. Paul's Avenue in Tompkinsville, Staten Island on March 9, 1915.

New York State Assembly
| Preceded by William T. Croak | New York State Assembly; Richmond County; 1908 | Succeeded by Thomas J. Lanahan |
| Preceded by Thomas J. Lanahan | New York State Assembly; Richmond County; 1910–1911 | Succeeded by Ralph R. McKee |
