= John B. Rose =

American politician

John Bailey Rose (April 14, 1875, in Haverstraw, Rockland County, New York – March 1949) was an American politician from New York.

== Life ==
He was the son of John Clark Rose and Martha (Bailey) Rose. He graduated Ph.B. from the Sheffield Scientific School of Yale University in 1897. He attended New York Law School in 1898, but abandoned the law, and engaged in the manufacture of brick instead. On October 5, 1898, he married Maude Moir Barclay, and they lived in Newburgh, Orange County, New York. Their only son John Barclay Rose died in 1919 of pneumonia.

Rose was a member of the New York State Senate (25th D.) from 1909 to 1912, sitting in the 132nd, 133rd, 134th and 135th New York State Legislatures.

He was President of the Greater New York Brick Company, a brick trust. In 1918, his brick and gravel companies went into receivership, and in 1919 he filed schedules in bankruptcy.

== Sources ==
- Sexennial Record of the Class of 1897, Sheffield Scientific by Gaius Barrett Rich (1903, pg. 52)
- Official New York from Cleveland to Hughes by Charles Elliott Fitch (Hurd Publishing Co., New York and Buffalo, 1911, Vol. IV; pg. 367)
- MADE BRICK TRUST SHERMAN LAW PROOF in NYT on April 13, 1912
- BRICK TRUST INVESTIGATION in NYT on May 17, 1913
- BRICKYARD OWNERS IN THE NIGHT COURT in NYT on May 22, 1913
- J. B. ROSE'S CONCERNS IN RECEIVERS' HANDS in NYT on June 8, 1918
- BUSINESS RECORDS in NYT on April 3, 1919
- JOHN BARCLAY ROSE...died... in NYT on September 21, 1919
- JOHN B. ROSE DIES; EX-STATE SENATOR in NYT on March 5, 1949 (subscription required)

New York State Senate
Preceded by Sanford W. Smith	New York State Senate; 25th District; 1909–1912	Succeeded by John D. Stivers
