= Frank L. Young =

American politician

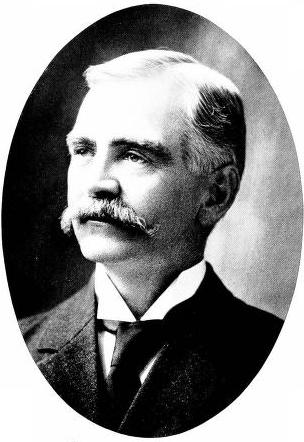
Frank L. Young (1916)

Frank L. Young (October 31, 1860 – May 21, 1930) was an American lawyer and politician from New York.

== Life ==
He was born on October 31, 1860, in Port Byron, Cayuga County, New York. He attended Oakwood Seminary in Union Springs. He graduated A.B. from Cornell University in 1888, and then became an instructor at the Mount Pleasant Military Academy. He was admitted to the bar in 1892, and was Corporation Counsel of the Village of Ossining.

Young was a member of the New York State Assembly (Westchester Co., 3rd D.) in 1909, 1910, 1911 and 1912; and was Majority Leader in 1912.

He was a member of the New York State Commission for the Panama–Pacific International Exposition in San Francisco in 1915; and a delegate to the New York State Constitutional Convention of 1915.

He was judge of Westchester County from 1915 to 1921; and a justice of the New York Supreme Court from 1922 until his death.

He died on May 21, 1930, at his home at 32 Linden Avenue in Ossining, of "acute indigestion".

== Sources ==
- Official New York from Cleveland to Hughes by Charles Elliott Fitch (Hurd Publishing Co., New York and Buffalo, 1911, Vol. IV; pg. 358f and 361)
- State of New York at the Panama-Pacific International Exposition, San Francisco, California, 1915 (Albany, 1916; pg. 35)
- REFUSES TO SENTENCE MEN ON GOOD FRIDAY in NYT on March 26, 1921
- JUSTICE F. L. YOUNG DIES AT AGE OF 69 in NYT on May 22, 1930 (subscription required)

New York State Assembly
Preceded by Isaac H. Smith	New York State Assembly; Westchester County, 3rd District; 1909–1912	Succeeded by Wilson Randolph Yard
Political offices
Preceded by Al Smith	Majority Leader of the New York State Assembly; 1912	Succeeded by Aaron J. Levy
