= Bradford R. Lansing =

American politician (1860–1912)

Bradford R. Lansing (September 6, 1860 in Niskayuna, Schenectady County, New York – February 4, 1912 in Rensselaer, Rensselaer County, New York) was an American politician from New York.

== Life ==
The family removed in 1870 to the Clinton Heights neighbourhood in the Town of East Greenbush. He married Alice R. Crannell.

He was the first Mayor of the City of Rensselaer, elected upon its incorporation in 1897.

Lansing was a member of the New York State Assembly in 1906, 1907, 1908, 1909, 1910, 1911 and 1912. Due to his illness, he did not take his seat during the session of 1912.

He died on February 4, 1912, at his home in Rensselaer, New York, after an illness of several weeks; and was buried at the Greenbush Cemetery in East Greenbush.

== Sources ==
- Official New York from Cleveland to Hughes by Charles Elliott Fitch (Hurd Publishing Co., New York and Buffalo, 1911, Vol. IV; pg. 352, 354, 356f, 359 and 361)
- New York Red Book (1911, pg. 146)
- Assemblyman B. R. Lansing in NYT on February 5, 1912
- Rensselaer County cemetery records at RootsWeb

New York State Assembly
Preceded by Calvin A. Gardner	New York State Assembly; Rensselaer County, 3rd District; 1906	Succeeded by district abolished
Preceded by Michael D. Nolan	New York State Assembly; Rensselaer County, 2nd District; 1907–1912	Succeeded by ?
