= Victor M. Allen =

American politician (1870–1916)

Victor M. Allen (July 14, 1870 in Petersburgh, Rensselaer County, New York – September 25, 1916 in Saranac Lake, New York) was an American politician from New York.

== Life ==
He was the son of Amos H. Allen and Emily J. (Maxon) Allen. He graduated from Columbia University in 1892, and then engaged in the book-publishing business with the Macmillan Company. On October 3, 1894, he married Blanche Rebekah Percy (1870–1949), and they had three children. He was President of the Taconic Valley Bank, of Berlin, New York.

Allen was Sheriff of Rensselaer County, New York from 1904 to 1906; a member of the New York State Senate (29th D.) from 1909 to 1912, sitting in the 132nd, 133rd, 134th and 135th New York State Legislatures; and a delegate to the New York State Constitutional Convention of 1915.

He died on September 25, 1916, in Saranac Lake, New York; and was buried at the Meadowlawn Cemetery in Petersburgh.

== Sources ==
- Official New York from Cleveland to Hughes by Charles Elliott Fitch (Hurd Publishing Co., New York and Buffalo, 1911, Vol. IV; pg. 367)
- Ex-State Senator Victor M. Allen in NYT on September 27, 1916
- Who's Who in New York (1911, pg. 17)

New York State Senate
Preceded by Frank M. Boyce	New York State Senate; 29th District; 1909–1912	Succeeded by John W. McKnight
