= William A. De Groot =

American lawyer and politician

William Albro De Groot (November 27, 1869 – March 1, 1932) was an American lawyer and politician from New York.

== Life ==
De Groot was born on November 27, 1869, in Brooklyn, New York, the son of Alexander De Groot and Jane McCullough.

De Groot moved to Orange County with his parents when he was seven. He grew up on a farm until 1881, when he returned to Brooklyn. When he was 14, he went to work in a business trade. When he was 18, he went to Mount Hermon School near Northfield, Massachusetts. He then went to Wesleyan Academy. In 1892, he was admitted to the Dickinson College in Carlisle, Pennsylvania. He graduated from there in 1897. He then went to New York University Law School and was admitted to the bar in 1899. He then practiced law in Brooklyn, initially as a member of the firm DeGroot, Kenyon & Hubbard, and then independently.

In 1903, De Groot was elected to the New York State Assembly as a Republican, representing the Queens County 2nd District. He served in the Assembly in 1904, 1906, 1907, 1908, and 1909.

In 1923, De Groot was appointed Assistant United States Attorney. Of the more than 1,000 cases he tried in the Circuit Court of Appeals, he didn't lose a single one. In light of his success, in 1925 President Coolidge appointed him the U.S. Attorney for the Eastern District of New York. A series of failures occurred under De Groot as well as fights with the Justice Department, culminating with Attorneys General John G. Sargent and William D. Mitchell both requesting De Groot's resignation in 1929. Newly-elected President Hoover proceeded to oust De Groot, who returned to a private law practice afterwards.

De Groot was a founder of the Richmond Hill Record and the Temple Forum. He was a member of the Freemasons, Sigma Alpha Epsilon, and the New York State Bar Association. He was a Methodist, serving as a local preacher and chairman of the board of trustees for Mt. Morris Methodist Episcopal Church. In 1900, he married Grace Lester Atkins. Their children were Alfred Hugo, Ethel Jane, Helen Marie, and Lester Atkins.

De Groot died in Jamaica Hospital following an appendectomy on March 1, 1932. He was buried in Cypress Hills Cemetery.

New York State Assembly
Preceded by Francis X. Duer	New York State Assembly; Queens County, 2nd District; 1904	Succeeded by Theo. P. Wilsnack
Preceded by Theo. P. Wilsnack	New York State Assembly; Queens County, 2nd District; 1906	Succeeded by Joseph Flanagan
Preceded by District Created	New York State Assembly; Queens County, 4th District; 1907–1909	Succeeded by Theodore P. Wilsnack
Legal offices
Preceded by Ralph C. Greene	U.S. Attorney for the Eastern District of New York; 1925–1929	Succeeded by Howard W. Ameli
