= Barth S. Cronin =

American politician (1858–1933)

Barth Stephen Cronin (June 14, 1858 in Brooklyn, Kings County, New York – February 15, 1933 in Brooklyn, New York City) was an American businessman and politician from New York.

== Life ==
He was the son of Richard Cronin, a dock builder, and Elizabeth (Hartye) Cronin. He attended Star of the Sea Parochial School, graduated from St. Francis College, and took a course at Brown's Business School. Then he joined his father's business, and later set up his own dock-building company. On January 4, 1883, he married Margaret Magdalen Kidney (1862–1944), and they had five children.

Cronin was a member of the New York State Senate (5th D.) from 1909 to 1912, sitting in the 132nd, 133rd, 134th and 135th New York State Legislatures; and was Chairman of the Committee on Banks from 1911 to 1912.

He died on February 15, 1933, at his home at 8070 Narrows Avenue in Brooklyn, of a heart attack; and was buried at the Holy Cross Cemetery there.

== Sources ==
- Official New York from Cleveland to Hughes by Charles Elliott Fitch (Hurd Publishing Co., New York and Buffalo, 1911, Vol. IV; pg. 366f)
- BANK PLUM FOR CRONIN in NYT on January 20, 1911
- B. S. CRONIN DEAD; EX-STATE SENATOR in NYT on February 16, 1933 (subscription required)
- BARTH S. CRONIN in the Brooklyn Daily Eagle on February 17, 1933
- FUNERAL TOMORROW in the Brooklyn Daily Eagle on February 17, 1933 (with portrait)
- Encyclopedia of American Biography (1934)

New York State Senate
Preceded by James A. Thompson	New York State Senate; 5th District; 1909–1912	Succeeded by William J. Heffernan
