= George A. Green =

American politician

George Abbott Green (December 25, 1876 – September 13, 1923) was an American lawyer and politician from New York.

== Life ==
Green was born on December 25, 1876, in New York City, the son of Joseph S. Green and Augusta Gallagher.

Green graduated from the Boys High School in Brooklyn. He then attended Dartmouth College, where he was a member of Psi Upsilon and Phi Beta Kappa. He graduated from there in 1898. He then studied law at New York Law School, graduating from there in 1900. He then began practicing law in Brooklyn.

In 1905, Green was elected to the New York State Assembly as a Republican with support from the Municipal Ownership League, representing the Kings County 12th District. He served in the Assembly in 1906, 1907, 1908, 1909, and 1910. While in the Assembly, he was a joint author of the Hinman-Green Bill for direct primaries, helped pass the Torrens Law, and opposed racetrack gambling.

In 1912, Green became an early member of the Progressive Party and was their candidate for the New York Supreme Court, although he lost the election. In 1914, he was appointed assistant corporation counsel. In the 1918 United States House of Representatives election, he was the Republican candidate for the New York's 5th congressional district. He lost the election to John B. Johnston.

In 1909, Green married Beatrice Shirley Patterson. Their only son was George A. Jr. He was an active member of the Freemasons.

Green died at home on September 13, 1923. He was buried in Green-Wood Cemetery.

New York State Assembly
Preceded by Oscar L. Thonet	New York State Assembly; Kings County, 12th District; 1906-1910	Succeeded by Sydney W. Fry
