= Felix J. Sanner =

American politician

Felix J. Sanner (1867 in Cleveland, Ohio – 1946) was an American politician from New York.

== Life ==
Sanner was a member of the New York State Assembly (Kings Co., 19th D.) in 1909 and 1910.

He was a member of the New York State Senate (9th D.) from 1911 to 1914, sitting in the 134th, 135th, 136th and 137th New York State Legislatures.

He was buried at the St. John Cemetery in Queens.

== Sources ==
- Official New York from Cleveland to Hughes by Charles Elliott Fitch (Hurd Publishing Co., New York and Buffalo, 1911, Vol. IV; pg. 357f and 367)
- The New York Red Book (1913; pg. 105)

New York State Assembly
Preceded by John Holbrook	New York State Assembly; Kings County, 19th District; 1909–1910	Succeeded by Jacob Schifferdecker
New York State Senate
Preceded by John Kissel	New York State Senate; 9th District; 1911–1914	Succeeded by Robert R. Lawson
