= Stephen J. Stilwell =

American politician (1866–1942)

Stephen J. Stilwell (May 10, 1866 – April 20, 1942) was an American lawyer and politician from New York.

== Life ==
He was born on May 10, 1866, on a farm just on the border line between Mount Vernon and Yonkers, in Westchester County, New York, the son of William J. Stilwell and Mary D. (Archer) Stilwell. He attended the Union Free School in Yonkers, graduated from New York University School of Law, was admitted to the bar, and practiced in Mount Vernon. For some time he owned and edited The Reformer, the Democratic newspaper of Mount Vernon.

Stilwell was a member of the New York State Senate (21st D.) from 1909 to 1913, sitting in the 132nd, 133rd, 134th, 135th and 136th New York State Legislatures. In 1913, Stilwell was accused by George H. Kendall, President of the New York Bank Note Company, of demanding a bribe of $3,500 to pass legislation which would make it a misdemeanor for the New York Stock Exchange to refuse certificates engraved by the New York Bank Note Company. The case was investigated by the Senate Committee on the Judiciary, but Stilwell was cleared by a vote of 28 to 21 in the Senate.

The report of the Senate investigation was then forwarded to D.A. of New York County Charles S. Whitman who prosecuted the case in the New York Supreme Court. Stilwell was convicted of bribery, and automatically forfeited his seat in the State Senate on May 24, 1913. He was sentenced by Justice Samuel Seabury to not less than four or more than eight years in prison, and on July 15, 1913, began serving his term in Sing Sing. On February 9, 1914, he was transferred to Great Meadow State Prison in Comstock.

In April 1941, he was arrested on a charge of attempted bribery, and remained incarcerated in the Westchester County Jail. On February 9, 1942, he pleaded guilty, and died on April 20 in Grasslands Hospital in Valhalla, New York, where he was receiving medical treatment while awaiting sentence in custody.

== Sources ==
- Official New York from Cleveland to Hughes by Charles Elliott Fitch (Hurd Publishing Co., New York and Buffalo, 1911, Vol. IV; pg. 367)
- Leslie's History of the Greater New York (1898; pg. 326)
- The New York Red Book (1909; pg. 103)
- CLEARS STILWELL ON BRIBE CHARGE in NYT on April 16, 1913
- STILWELL GUILTY OF ASKING BRIBE in NYT on May 25, 1913
- STILWELL'S TERM IS 4 TO 8 YEARS in NYT on May 29, 1913
- STILWELL IN PRISON; WILL NOT CONFESS in NYT on July 16, 1913
- STILWELL AT COMSTOCK in NYT on February 10, 1914
- S. J. STILWELL DIES AT 76 in NYT on April 22, 1942 (subscription required)

New York State Senate
Preceded by James Owens	New York State Senate; 21st District; 1909–1913	Succeeded by John Davidson
