= John M. Lupton =

American politician

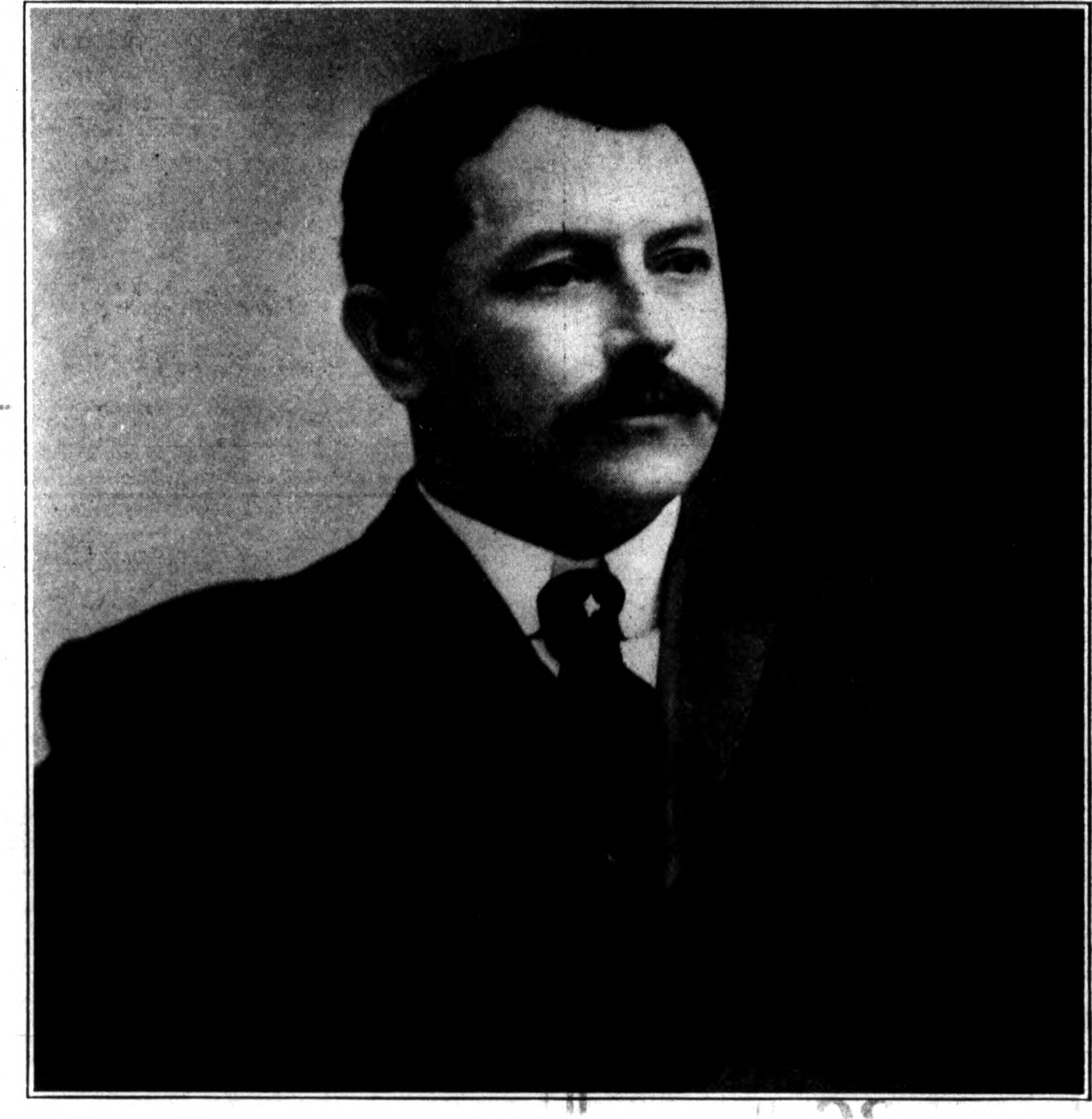
John M. Lupton

John Mather Lupton (October 6, 1856 – August 1, 1921) was an American seed-grower, politician, and banker from New York.

== Life ==
Lupton was born on October 6, 1856, in Mattituck, New York, the son of farmer Edmund F. Lupton and Hannah Moore.

Lupton attended the Franklinville Academy. In 1880, he began growing seeds and selling them to some of the largest seed dealers in the country. By 1896, he became a prominent American seed-grower and was considered an authority on seed-growing. He originated several varieties of cabbage and was the largest producer of cabbage seed in the United States. He owned fifty acres dedicated to his seed-growing. He contributed to a number of American agricultural journals, and published a book called "Cabbage and Cauliflower for Profit." He was also president of the Hallock & Duryee Fertilizer Company and a lecturer for the Farmers' Institute of Long Island, and a member of the American Seed Trade Association. In 1915, he became president of the Association.

In 1900, Lupton organized the Long Island Cauliflower Growers Association and served as its general manager. In 1904, he organized the Long Island Seed Co. He was president of the Mattituck Bank and the Mattituck Board of Trade. He also served as president of the Suffolk Printing and Publishing Co., and Governor Whitman appointed him a trustee of the Farmingdale State School. He worked with his son Robert M. under the firm name J. M. Lupton & Son.

Lupton served for a number of years in the Republican County Committee. In 1905, he was elected to the New York State Assembly as a Republican, representing the Suffolk County 1st District. He served in the Assembly in 1906, 1907, 1908, 1909, and 1910.

Lupton was a member of the Freemasons, the Royal Arch Masonry, the Order of United American Mechanics, and the Grange. In 1879, he married Millie F. Edwards. Their children were Belle C., Robert M., and Russell E.

Lupton died at home from apoplexy on August 1, 1921. He was buried in the Bethany Cemetery in Mattituck.

New York State Assembly
| Preceded by Willis A. Reeve | New York State Assembly; Suffolk County, 1st District; 1906–1910 | Succeeded by DeWitt C. Talmage |
