= Gottfried H. Wende =

American politician (1852–1933)

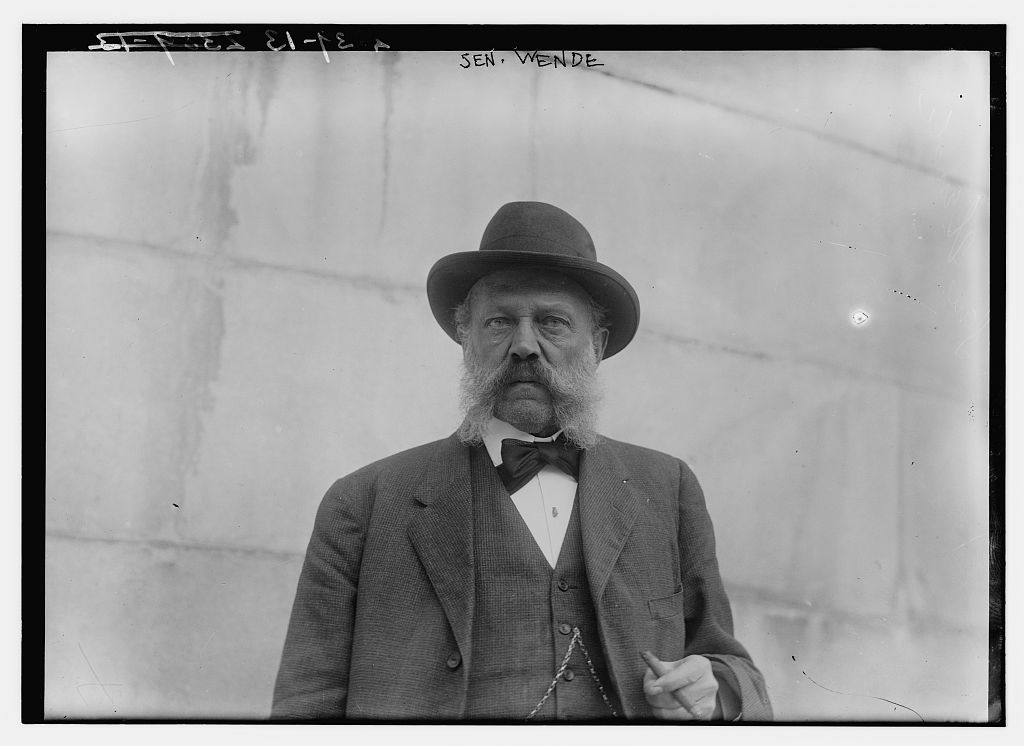
Wende in 1913

Gottfried H. Wende (March 6, 1852 - December 3, 1933), was an American lawyer and politician from New York.

== Early life ==
Wende was born in Alden, New York on March 6, 1852. He was the son of Herman A. von Wende (1825–1892), a Colonel in the German Army, and Mary R. Wende (1833–1919).

He was educated at the Millgrove, Clarence Union School, Buffalo Central School, and graduated with the first-ever law class of Cornell Law School at Cornell University in 1876.

== Career ==
After reading law with Judge Cothran, Wende was admitted to the bar in 1877 and practiced law for 61 years, keeping his law office, Wende & Wende, at the Erie County Savings Bank.

As a Democrat, he was a member of New York State Assembly (Erie Co., 7th D.) in 1909, beating Robert H. Reed. Wende was appointed a member of the Code and Military Affairs committees by Speaker James Wolcott Wadsworth Jr. He also served in the 1910, 1911 and 1912. Reportedly, New York Governor Al Smith's favorite story involved Wende and took place when both were members of the Assembly:

"Serving in the state legislature, he [Smith] was involved in a floor debate with three Republican representatives: Ed Merritt, Fred Hammond, and Jesse Phillips. As the discussion grew heated, an assemblyman from Buffalo, Gottfried Wende, asked the privilege of interrupting. Wende's addition to the proceedings, breathed with the air of a town crier announcing the results of a critical battle, was the declaration, 'Mr. Speaker, I have just heard that Cornell won the boat race.' Merritt was the first to reply: 'That doesn't mean anything to me. I'm a Yale man.' Hammond then chipped in, 'It doesn't mean anything to me. I'm a Harvard man.' Finally, Phillips added, 'It doesn't mean anything to me, I'm a U. of M. man." If the speakers thought that they were humiliating Al Smith, bring him up short with their pedigrees, they most definitely underestimated the man's quickness of wit. Al simply turned and said, 'It doesn't mean anything to me... I am an F.F.M. man,' At that a Tammany assemblyman yelled out, 'What is that Al?' and Smith answered. 'Fulton Fish Market. Let's proceed with the debate.'"

He was a member of the New York State Senate (50th D.) in 1913 and 1914. Wende was a close friend of both Grover Cleveland and Franklin D. Roosevelt.

== Personal life ==
Wende was married to Anna C. Schmidt (1885–1912). He bought the Wende Cottage at 2256 Bailey Avenue in Buffalo where he lived with his family. Together, they were the parents of four children, including:

- Herman A. Wende, an electrical inspector.
- Anna Wende, who married Richter, the owner of Richter Periodical Company.

Wende died at his home in Buffalo, New York on December 3, 1933. He was 81 years old.

New York State Assembly
Preceded by George W. Walters	New York State Assembly; Erie County, 7th District; 1909–1912	Succeeded by Joseph Vincent Fitzgerald
New York State Senate
Preceded by George B. Burd	New York State Senate; 50th District; 1913–1914	Succeeded by William P. Greiner
