= George L. Meade =

American politician (1869–1925)

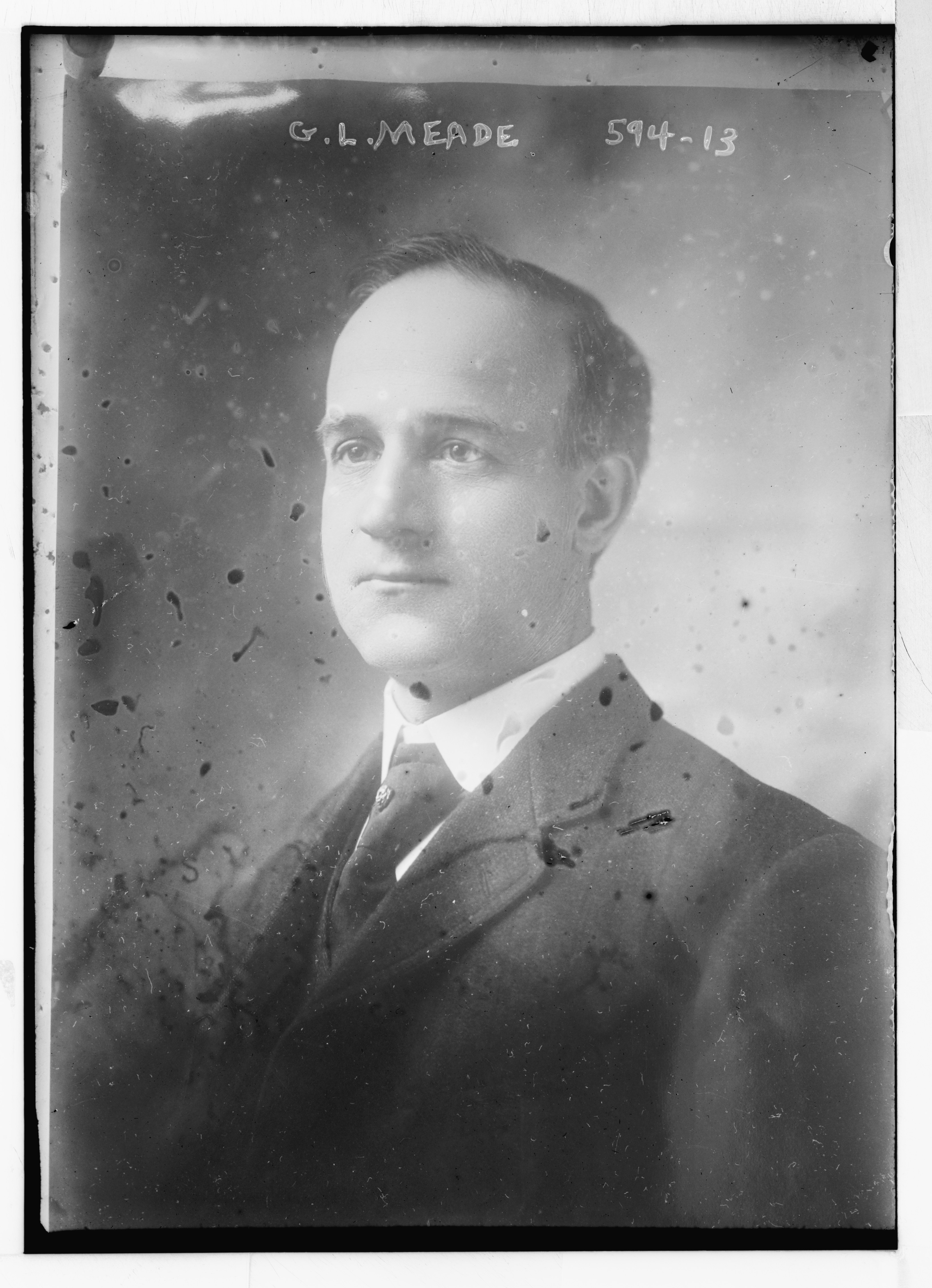
George L. Meade

George L. Meade (April 25, 1869 – January 11, 1925) was an American lawyer and politician from New York.

== Life ==
Meade was born in Clyde, New York. He attended Clyde High School, and graduated from Lebanon University (Ohio) in 1892. Then he studied law in Rochester, was admitted to the bar in 1896, and practiced in Rochester. He was Supervisor of the 6th Ward of Rochester in 1903.

Meade was a member of the New York State Assembly (Monroe Co., 3rd D.) in 1908; and a member of the New York State Senate (45th D.) in the 1909 and 1910.

He was Deputy Attorney General of New York, in charge of the trial of cases before the New York Court of Claims, from 1915 to 1923.

He died on January 11, 1925, at his home in Rochester, New York, from heart disease.

== Sources ==
- Official New York from Cleveland to Hughes by Charles Elliott Fitch (Hurd Publishing Co., New York and Buffalo, 1911, Vol. IV; pg. 355 and 367)
- Rochester politicians at NY Gen Web
- BALKS AT PRIMARIES in NYT on October 13, 1910
- FORMER STATE OFFICIAL DIES in The Morning Herald, of Gloversville, on January 12, 1925

New York State Assembly
Preceded by Henry R. Glynn	New York State Assembly; Monroe County, 3rd District; 1908	Succeeded by Louis E. Lazarus
New York State Senate
Preceded by Thomas B. Dunn	New York State Senate; 45th District; 1909–1910	Succeeded by George F. Argetsinger
