= Harry Kopp =

American politician (1880–1943)

Harry Kopp (February 22, 1880 – October 27, 1943) was a Belarusian-born Jewish-American lawyer and politician.

== Life ==
Kopp was born on February 22, 1880, in Brest-Litovsk, Russia, the son of Benjamin Kopp and Sarah Yochen.

Kopp immigrated to America shortly after he was born. He spent a year in public school and worked in various trades until 1898. He then began working in the cigar trade, becoming leader of the Progressive Rolled Cigar Makers' Union from 1899 to 1901. He was also a delegate and organizer of the Central Federated Union and the Board of Hebrew Trades. From 1901 to 1906, he worked as a clerk for the postal office. He began studying law while working in the Post Office and graduated from New York Law School in 1906. He then became a practicing lawyer and by 1910 had a law office at 170 Broadway in New York City. In 1909, he formed a partnership with Nathan D. Perlman. Samuel Markewich joined them in 1910, at which point the firm became Kopp, Markewich & Perlman.

In 1909, Kopp was elected to the New York State Assembly as a Republican, representing the New York County 6th District. He served in the Assembly in 1910, 1911, and 1912. His district was on the Lower East Side. While in the Assembly, he wrote the Private Bankers Law in 1911. He lost the 1912 re-election to the Assembly to Democratic candidate Jacob Silverstein. He ran again in 1913 with the endorsement of the Independence League, only to lose to Progressive candidate William Sulzer. He was an alternate delegate to the 1912 and 1916 Republican National Conventions.

Kopp wrote a number of pamphlets and did a number of lectures and debates opposed to socialism. He was counsel for the defense in over fifteen homicide trials, including People vs. Chin Sing. By 1926, he lived in the Bronx and had a law office in 51 Chambers Street. In 1927, future New York Supreme Court Justice Samuel Null joined Kopp's law firm, which became known as Kopp, Markewich & Null. In 1933, he retired from law due to an illness. By the time he died, he was living in Scarsdale.

Kopp was a member of the New York County Lawyers' Association, the Grand Street Boys Association, the Bronx County Republican Committee, the Independent Order Brith Abraham, the Israel Orphan Asylum, and the Hebrew Immigrant Aid Society. In 1909, he married Lena Newhouse. Their children were Mrs. Gertrude Wasserstrom, Mrs. Evelyn Harris, Mrs. Irma Kent, and Bernard.

Kopp died in Mount Sinai Hospital on October 27, 1943. He was buried in Mount Hebron Cemetery.

New York State Assembly
| Preceded by Adolph Stern | New York State Assembly; New York County, 6th District; 1910–1912 | Succeeded by Jacob Silverstein |
