= James W. Oliver =

American politician

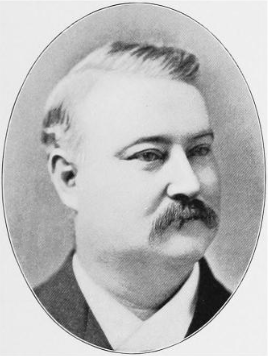

Member of the New York State Assembly
- In office 1907–1911
- Constituency: New York County, 3rd District
- In office 1906
- Constituency: New York County, 6th District
- In office 1884–1885, 1898
- Constituency: New York County, 2nd District

Personal details
- Born: 1843 or 1844 New York, New York, US
- Died: September 18, 1911 Manhattan, New York, US
- Resting place: Calvary Cemetery
- Education: St. John's College
- Occupation: Lawyer, politician

James W. Oliver (1843 or 1844 – September 18, 1911) was an American lawyer and politician from New York.

== Life ==
He graduated from St. John's College. Then he studied law, was admitted to the bar, and practiced in New York City.

Oliver was a member of the New York State Assembly in 1884, 1885, 1898, 1906, 1907, 1908, 1909, 1910 and 1911; and was Minority Leader in 1907.

He died on September 18, 1911, in St. Vincent's Hospital in Manhattan; and was buried at the Calvary Cemetery in Queens.

New York State Assembly
Preceded by Thomas Maher	New York State Assembly; New York County, 2nd District; 1884–1885	Succeeded by Thomas Maher
Preceded by Thomas J. Barry	New York State Assembly; New York County, 2nd District; 1898	Succeeded by James A. Rierdon
Preceded by Charles Anderson	New York State Assembly; New York County, 6th District; 1906	Succeeded by Adolph Stern
Preceded by John T. Eagleton	New York State Assembly; New York County, 3rd District; 1907–1911	Succeeded by John C. Fitzgerald
