= John V. Sheridan =

American lawyer and politician

Member of the New York State Senate
- In office 1917 - 1918

Personal details
- Born: February 3, 1879 New York City
- Died: October 14, 1947 (aged 68)
- Occupation: Lawyer, Politician

John V. Sheridan (February 3, 1879 in New York City – October 14, 1947) was an American lawyer and politician from New York.

== Life ==
Sheridan was a member of the New York State Assembly (New York Co., 35th D.) in 1907, 1908 and 1909.

He was a member of the New York State Senate (22nd D.) in 1917 and 1918.

During the 1930s, he opposed the Democratic leader of the Bronx Edward J. Flynn; and in 1938, he supported Republican Thomas E. Dewey for Governor.

== Sources ==
- BRONX DEMOCRAT SUPPORTS DEWEY; Ex-State Senator J. V. Sheridan Urges Independents to Back Rotation in Office in NYT on October 23, 1938 (subscription required)
- JOHN V. SHERIDAN, 67, FLYNN'S FOE IN BRONX in NYT on October 15, 1947 (subscription required)

New York State Senate
Preceded by John P. Cohalan	New York State Assembly; New York Co., 35th District; 1907–1909	Succeeded by Edward J. L. Raldiris
New York State Senate
Preceded by James A. Hamilton	New York State Senate; 9th District; 1917–1918	Succeeded by Peter A. Abeles
