= Thomas J. Surpless =

American politician

Thomas John Surpless (December 23, 1877 Brooklyn, Kings County, New York – December 23, 1911 Brooklyn, New York City) was an American lawyer and politician from New York.

== Life ==
He was the son of James Surpless (1850–1909), a hardware merchant, and Fannie Curtis (Oliver) Surpless. He graduated from Cornell University in 1900. Then he practiced law in Brooklyn. He married Anna Morrison, and they had a daughter.

Surpless was a member of the New York State Assembly in 1906, 1907, 1908 and 1909.

During a summer vacation in 1911, he took part in the rescue of several young women who had fallen into the Delaware River, and thereby contracted malaria. Afterwards he remained in ill health, and died on December 23, 1911, at his home at 415 Kosciuszko Street in Brooklyn, from typhoid fever.

== Sources ==
- Official New York from Cleveland to Hughes by Charles Elliott Fitch (Hurd Publishing Co., New York and Buffalo, 1911, Vol. IV; pg. 317, 319, 339, 352, 354f, 357 and 359f)
- JAMES SURPLESS...died... in NYT on July 8, 1909
- T. J. SURPLESS DEAD in NYT on December 25, 1911
- The New York Red Book (1906; pg. 176)

New York State Assembly
Preceded by Charles J. Dodd	New York State Assembly; Kings County, 6th District; 1906–1909	Succeeded by John H. Gerken
