= Loren H. White =

American politician

Loren H. White (1863 in Duanesburg, New York – October 29, 1923 in Delanson, New York) was an American politician from New York.

== Life ==
He was the son of Icabod White (1830–1887) and Olive A. (Hungerford) White (1837–1920). He engaged in the furniture and undertaking business. On June 28, 1900, he married Cora Macomber (1870–1948), and their son was Galen White (1901–1966).

White was at times Postmaster of Delanson; a Justice of the Peace of Duanesburg; Supervisor of the Town of Duanesburg; and a Trustee of the Village of Delanson.

He was a member of the New York State Assembly (Schenectady Co.) in 1909 and 1910.

He was a member of the New York State Senate (31st D.) from 1911 to 1914, sitting in the 134th, 135th, 136th and 137th New York State Legislatures. In 1913, he voted for the impeachment of Governor William Sulzer, and was defeated for re-election in 1914.

He died on October 29, 1923, at his home in Delanson, New York, after a long illness; and was buried at the Grove Cemetery there.

== Sources ==
- Official New York from Cleveland to Hughes by Charles Elliott Fitch (Hurd Publishing Co., New York and Buffalo, 1911, Vol. IV; pg. 357, 359 and 367)
- New York Red Book (1913; pg. 113)
- ...Senator Loren H. White...was defeated... in NYT on November 7, 1914

New York State Assembly
Preceded by Miles R. Frisbie	New York State Assembly; Schenectady County; 1909–1910	Succeeded by John C. Myers
New York State Senate
Preceded by William A. Gardner	New York State Senate; 31st District; 1911–1914	Succeeded by Arden L. Norton
