= Irving J. Joseph =

American lawyer and politician

Irving J. Joseph (c. 1881 in New York City – March 1943) was an American lawyer and politician from New York.

== Life ==
Joseph was a member of the New York State Assembly (New York Co., 26th D.) in 1909 and 1910.

He was a member of the New York State Senate (20th D.) in 1915 and 1916.

== Sources ==
- Official New York from Cleveland to Hughes by Charles Elliott Fitch (Hurd Publishing Co., New York and Buffalo, 1911, Vol. IV; pg. 357 and 359)
- IRVING J. JOSEPH, 62, EX-STATE SENATOR in NYT on March 27, 1943 (subscription required)

New York State Assembly
| Preceded by Solomon Strauss | New York State Assembly; New York County, 26th District; 1909–1910 | Succeeded by Abram Goodman |
New York State Senate
| Preceded by James J. Frawley | New York State Senate; 20th District; 1915–1916 | Succeeded by Salvatore A. Cotillo |
