= Edward Lauterbach =

American lawyer

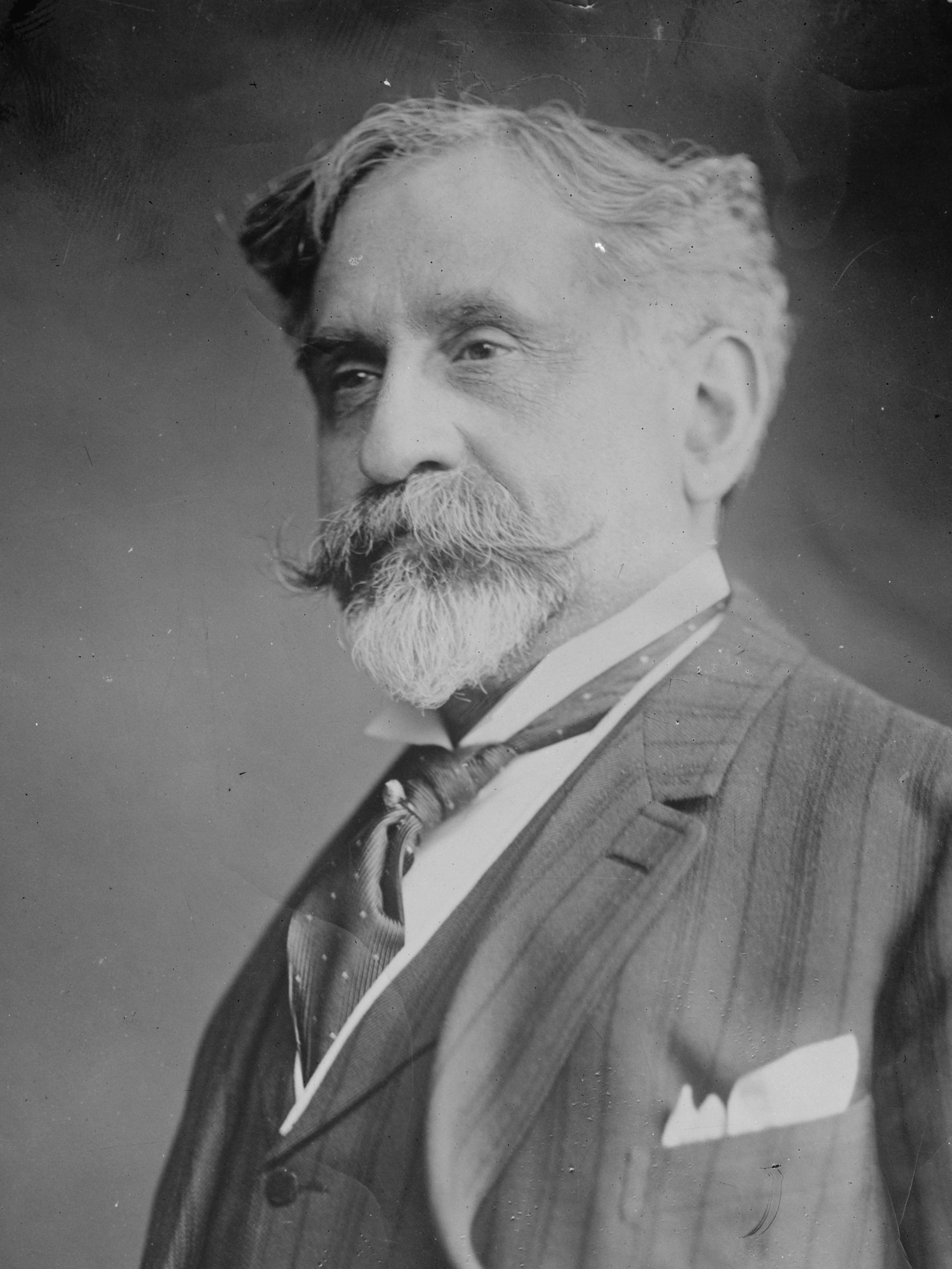
Edward Lauterbach

Edward Lauterbach (August 12, 1844 – March 4, 1923), was Chairman of the Republican County Committee in New York and the defense attorney for David Lamar, the "Wolf of Wall Street". He was a trustee of the Hebrew Orphan Asylum for over 39 years.

== Biography ==
He was born on August 12, 1844, in New York City. His education was begun in the public schools and continued in the College of the City of New York, where he graduated with honors in 1864. He received his degree entered upon a course of law in the offices of Townsend, Dyett & Morrison. After his admission to the New York City Bar Association he became a member of this firm, which was then reorganized under the name of Morrison, Lauterbach & Spingarn.

He was a delegate to the 1894 New York State Constitutional Convention. He served one term on the New York State Board of Regents from 1904 to 1911.

His only son Alfred Lauterbach died at the age of 37 in a car accident early morning July 30, 1908.

He died on March 4, 1923.
