= John F. Schlosser =

American politician (1839–?)

John F. Schlosser (August 22, 1839–?) was a Republican member of the New York State Senate from the 26th district who was born in the city of Poughkeepsie, New York. After graduating from Union College, Schlosser went to Fishkill Landing in Duchess County, opened a law office, and actively practiced law. He was succeeded by future president Franklin D. Roosevelt.

New York State Senate
Preceded by John N. Cordts	New York State Senate; 26th District; 1909-1910	Succeeded by Franklin D. Roosevelt
