= Lafayette B. Gleason =

American political activist (1863–1937)

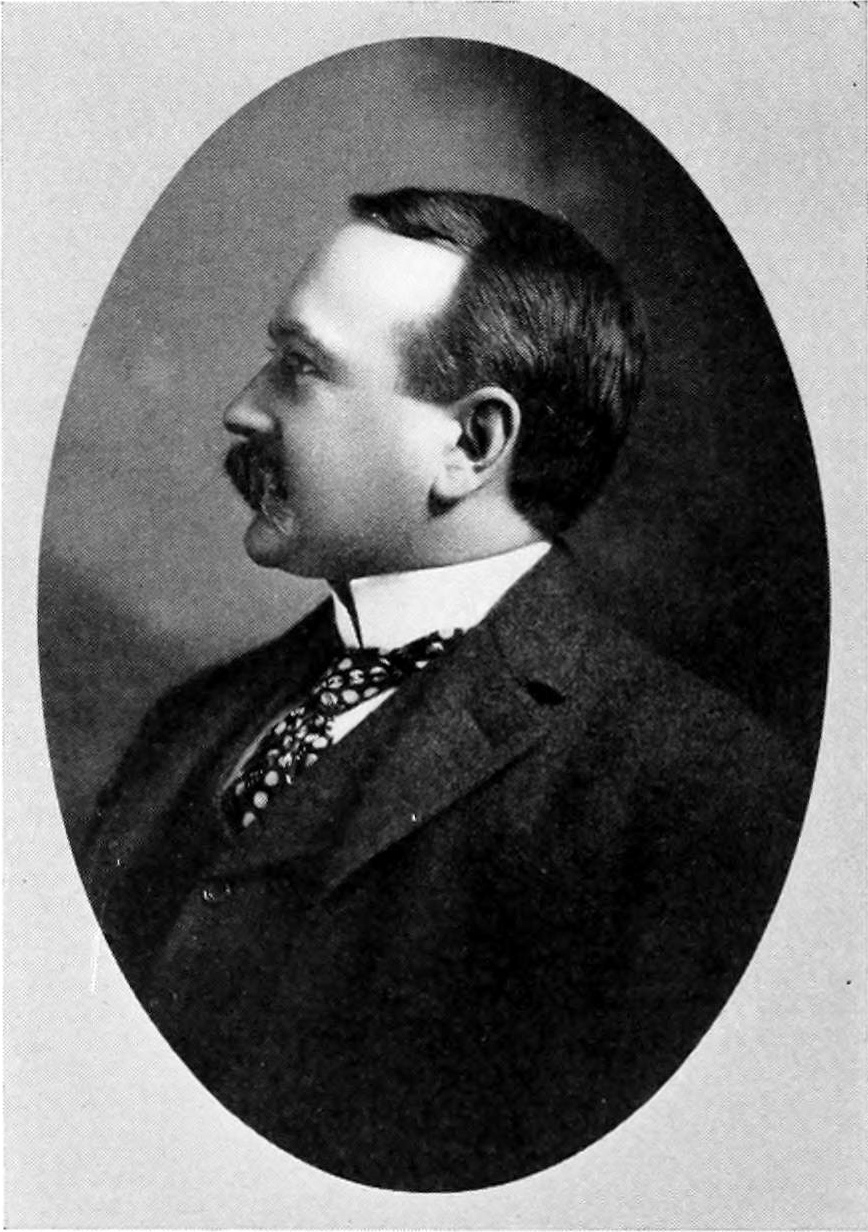
Lafayette Blanchard Gleason

Lafayette Blanchard Gleason (May 30, 1863 – October 24, 1937) was the secretary of the Republican State Committee of New York from 1906 to 1937, and he was also the General Secretary for seven Republican National Conventions.

== Publications ==
- A treatise on the law of inheritance taxation, 1917-1922
