= Frank Howard (New York politician) =

American politician

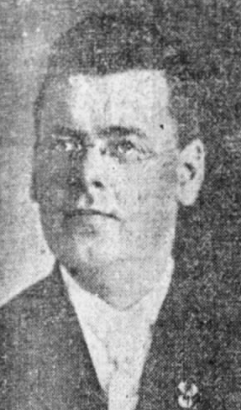

Member of the New York State Assembly from Tioga County
- In office January 1, 1908 – July 1, 1910
- Preceded by: Byram L. Winters
- Succeeded by: Otis S. Beach

Personal details
- Born: February 4, 1873 Candor, New York, U.S.
- Died: December 12, 1933 (aged 60) Waverly, New York, U.S.
- Party: Republican
- Spouse: Josephine Frisbie (m. 1898)
- Children: 4

Frank L. Howard (February 4, 1873 – December 12, 1933) was an American politician who served in the New York State Assembly as a member of the Republican Party. He was active in local politics and served on multiple municipal and county boards until his death.

== Early life ==
Frank L. Howard was born on February 4, 1873, in Candor, New York, to Loring P. and Emily Barden Howard. He graduated from Spencer Academy. On June 28, 1898, he married Josephine Frisbie, with whom he had four children.

He studied law in the Bacon & Aldrich office in Elmira, New York, and was admitted to the bar on July 7, 1896. From 1895 to 1897, he taught shorthand and typewriting at Elmira Reformatory before he moved to Waverly, New York, in 1897. In Waverly, he established a law practice and later formed the Howard & Sebring partnership with Edgar Sebring that lasted from 1905 to 1919.

== Career ==
=== Local politics ===
In 1897, Howard was appointed to serve as the clerk of Waverly. In 1902, he was elected to serve as Tioga County supervisor and served until his election to the New York State Assembly.

From 1915 to 1922, he served on the Tioga County Board of Supervisors until he resigned to become the president of the First National Bank of Waverly, where he served until the bank was placed into receivership on September 2, 1933. In 1927, he was appointed to serve on the Waverly Water Board with his term meant to expire on March 1, 1934. He served as president of the board from 1927 to 1929.

In 1926, Howard was elected to the Waverly Board of Education from the 7th district and served as president of the board from 1932 to 1933. He served on the board until his death and at the time his term was meant to expire in 1935.

Howard, Owego Mayor Albert S. Andrews, and Assemblyman Frank G. Miller were selected to serve as Tioga County's at-large delegates to the New York convention about the repeal of the 18th Amendment. They were part of the 150 at-large delegates selected by prohibitionist Anti-Saloon League to argue against the repeal of the amendment.

=== New York Assembly ===
On August 31, 1907, Howard announced that he would run for the Republican nomination to succeed Byram L. Winters in the New York Assembly from Tioga County. He ran for the Republican nomination unopposed and received the nomination on October 5, by acclamation at the Tioga County convention. In the general election he defeated Democratic nominee Otis S. Beach.

On August 14, 1908, Howard stated that he would not run to succeed Owen Cassidy in the New York Senate and would instead seek another term in the Assembly. On September 25, he was renominated at the Republican county convention and won reelection. On October 1, 1909, Howard was renominated at the Republican county convention by a unanimous vote and won reelection against Democratic nominee Mathew Walpole.

On September 20, 1910, Howard was renominated at the Republican county convention, but was defeated in the general election by Democratic nominee Otis S. Beach.

== Later life ==
In 1924, he was selected to represent his local Methodist church at the General Conference in Springfield, Massachusetts. In 1928, he represented his church at the conference in Kansas City. In January 1933, Howard announced that he would resume his law practice in Waverly and restarted in September.

On October 19, 1933, Howard fell ill and died on December 12, in Waverly, New York, at the age of 60.

== Electoral history ==
1908 New York Assembly Tioga County election
| Party | Candidate | Votes | % |
|---|---|---|---|
| Republican | Frank Howard (incumbent) | 823 | 60.78% |
| Democratic | Woods | 531 | 39.22% |
| Total votes | | 1,354 | 100.00% |

1910 New York Assembly Tioga County election
| Party | Candidate | Votes | % |
|---|---|---|---|
| Democratic | Otis S. Beach | 3,070 | 53.96% |
| Republican | Frank Howard (incumbent) | 2,619 | 46.04% |
| Total votes | | 5,689 | 100.00% |

New York State Assembly
| Preceded by Byram L. Winters | New York State Assembly; Tioga County; 1908-1910 | Succeeded by Otis S. Beach |
