= Moritz Graubard =

American politician

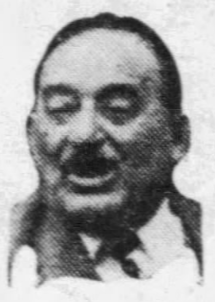
Alderman Graubard circa 1926.

Moritz Graubard (18 January 1867 – August 9, 1944) was an American politician from New York. A Democrat, he served as a member of the New York State Assembly for New York County's 8th district from 1908 to 1912 and was a member of the New York City Board of Aldermen for the 2nd district from 1920 to 1931.

Graubard was born in Iași, United Principalities of Moldavia and Wallachia (modern Romania). He came to the United States at the age of 14 and served as Assistant Warden of the Ludlow Street Jail and worked in the office of the Commissioner of Accounts. He was elected to the Assembly in 1907 and would serve in it until defeated by progressive Solomon Sufrin in 1912. He would be elected to the Board of Aldermen in 1919, retiring in 1931.

In 1926, he and his wife returned home to Romania for the first time since emigrating.

He died in a nursing home on August 9, 1944, and was buried in Mount Carmel Cemetery.

New York State Assembly
Preceded by Abraham Harawitz	New York State Assembly; New York County, 8th District; January 1, 1908 – December 31, 1912	Succeeded by Solomon Sufrin
