= Mervin C. Stanley =

American businessman and politician

Mervin Clark Stanley (May 6, 1857 in New Britain, Hartford County, Connecticut – February 1, 1907 in New York City) was an American businessman and politician from New York.

== Life ==
He was the son of Oliver Cromwell Stanley (1823–1871) and Charlotte (Hine) Stanley (1823–1897). He became a lumber, coal and builders' supplies merchant in New Britain. On January 23, 1884, he married Martha Fenn Miles (1863–1918). In 1899, he removed to New York City, and became a partner in a firm of commission merchants and exporters.

He entered politics as a Republican, and became a personal friend of Gov. Charles Evans Hughes. Stanley was a member of the New York State Assembly in 1905, 1906 (both New York Co., 19th D.) and 1907 (New York Co., 15th D.).

He died on February 1, 1907, at his home at 329 West 82nd Street in Manhattan, after two operations for appendicitis; and was buried at the Fairview Cemetery in New Britain.

== Sources ==
- Official New York from Cleveland to Hughes by Charles Elliott Fitch (Hurd Publishing Co., New York and Buffalo, 1911, Vol. IV; pg. 350, 352 and 354)
- ASSEMBLYMAN STANLEY DEAD in NYT on February 2, 1907
- MERVIN STANLEY'S FUNERAL in NYT on February 4, 1907
- The Stanley Families of America by Israel Perkins Warren

New York State Assembly
Preceded by Charles F. Bostwick	New York State Assembly; New York County, 19th District; 1905–1906	Succeeded by Alexander Brough
Preceded by Owen W. Bohan	New York State Assembly; New York County, 15th District; 1907	Succeeded by William M. Bennett
