= Ice algae =

Algal communities in sea ice, lake ice or terrestrial glacier ice

Ice algae are any of the various types of algal communities found in annual and multi-year sea, and terrestrial lake ice or glacier ice.

On sea ice in the polar oceans, ice algae communities play an important role in primary production. The timing of blooms of the algae is especially important for supporting higher trophic levels at times of the year when light is low and ice cover still exists. Sea ice algal communities are mostly concentrated in the bottom layer of the ice, but can also occur in brine channels within the ice, in melt ponds, and on the surface.

Because terrestrial ice algae occur in freshwater systems, the species composition differs greatly from that of sea ice algae. In particular, terrestrial glacier ice algae communities are significant in that they change the color of glaciers and ice sheets, impacting the reflectivity of the ice itself.

== Sea ice algae ==
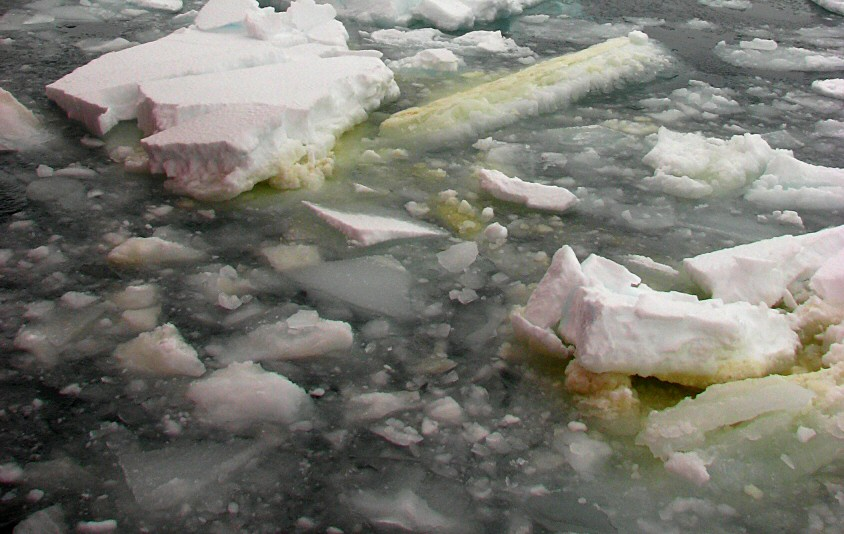
Antarctic diatom algae covering the underwater surface of broken sea ice in the Ross Sea.

=== Adapting to the sea ice environment ===
Microbial life in sea ice is extremely diverse, and includes abundant algae, bacteria and protozoa. Algae in particular dominate the sympagic environment, with estimates of more than 1000 unicellular eukaryotes found to associate with sea ice in the Arctic. Species composition and diversity vary based on location, ice type, and irradiance. In general, pennate diatoms such as Nitzschia frigida (in the Arctic) and Fragilariopsis cylindrus (in the Antarctic) are abundant. Melosira arctica, which forms up to meter-long filaments attached to the bottom of the ice, are also widespread in the Arctic and are an important food source for marine species.

While sea ice algae communities are found throughout the column of sea ice, abundance and community composition depends on the time of year. There are many microhabitats available to algae on and within sea ice, and different algal groups have different preferences. For example, in late winter/early spring, motile diatoms like N. frigida have been found to dominate the uppermost layers of the ice, as far as briny channels reach, and their abundance is greater in multi-year ice (MYI) than in first year ice (FYI). Additionally, dinoflagellates have also been found to dominant in the early austral spring in Antarctic sea ice.

Sea ice algal communities can also thrive at the surface of the ice, in surface melt ponds, and in layers where rafting has occurred. In melt ponds, dominant algal types can vary with pond salinity, with higher concentrations of diatoms being found in melt ponds with higher salinity. Because of their adaption to low light conditions, the presence of ice algae (in particular, vertical position in the ice pack) is primarily limited by nutrient availability. The highest concentrations are found at the base of the ice because the porosity of that ice enables nutrient infiltration from seawater.

To survive in the harsh sea ice environment, organisms must be able to endure extreme variations in salinity, temperature, and solar radiation. Algae living in brine channels can secrete osmolytes, such as dimethylsulfoniopropionate (DMSP), which allows them to survive the high salinities in the channels after ice formation in the winter, as well as low salinities when the relatively fresh meltwater flushes the channels in the spring and summer. Some sea ice algae species secrete ice-binding proteins (IBP) as a gelatinous extracellular polymeric substance (EPS) to protect cell membranes from damage from ice crystal growth and freeze thaw cycles. EPS alters the microstructure of the ice and creates further habitat for future blooms. Ice algae survive in environments with little to no light for several months of the year, such as within ice brine pockets. Such algae have specialized adaptations to be able to maintain growth and reproduction during periods of darkness. Some sea ice diatoms have been found to utilize mixotrophy when light levels are low. For example, some Antarctic diatoms downregulate glycolysis in environments with low to no irradiance, while upregulating other mitochondrial metabolic pathways, including the Entner−Doudoroff pathway which provides the TCA cycle (an important component in cellular respiration) with pyruvate when pyruvate cannot be obtained via photosynthesis. Surface-dwelling algae produce special pigments to prevent damage from harsh ultraviolet radiation. Higher concentrations of xanthophyll pigments act as a sunscreen that protects ice algae from photodamage when they are exposed to damaging levels of ultraviolet radiation upon transition from ice to the water column during the spring. Algae under thick ice have been reported to show some of the most extreme low light adaptations ever observed. They are able to perform photosynthesis in an environment with just 0.02% of the light at the surface. Extreme efficiency in light utilization allows sea ice algae to build up biomass rapidly when light conditions improve at the onset of spring.

=== Role in ecosystem ===
Sea ice algae play a critical role in primary production and serve as part of the base of the polar food web by converting carbon dioxide and inorganic nutrients to oxygen and organic matter through photosynthesis in the upper ocean of both the Arctic and Antarctic. Within the Arctic, estimates of the contribution of sea ice algae to total primary production ranges from 3-25%, up to 50-57% in high Arctic regions. Sea ice algae accumulate biomass rapidly, often at the base of sea ice, and grow to form algal mats that are consumed by amphipods such as krill and copepods. Ultimately, these organisms are eaten by fish, whales, penguins, and dolphins. When sea ice algal communities detach from the sea ice they are consumed by pelagic grazers, such as zooplankton, as they sink through the water column and by benthic invertebrates as they settle on the seafloor. Sea ice algae as food are rich in polyunsaturated and other essential fatty acids, and are the exclusive producer of certain essential omega-3 fatty acids that are important for copepod egg production, egg hatching, and zooplankton growth and function.

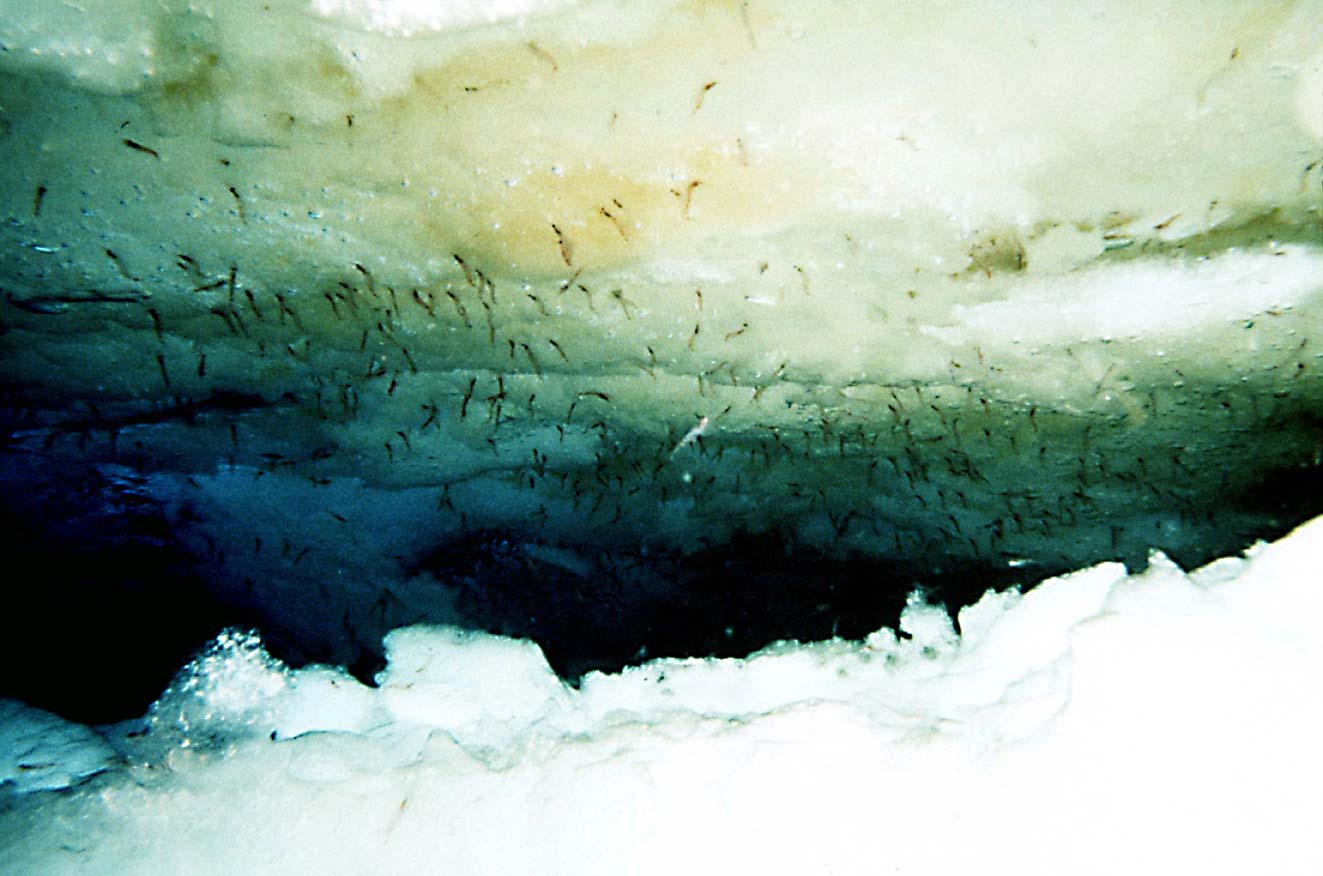
The undersurface of the pack ice in Antarctica colored green - Antarctic krill scraping off the ice algae

==== Temporal variation ====
The timing of sea ice algae blooms has a significant impact on the entire ecosystem. Initiation of the bloom is primarily controlled by the return of the sun in the spring (i.e. the solar angle). Because of this, ice algae blooms usually occurs before the blooms of pelagic phytoplankton, which require higher light levels and warmer water. Early in the season, prior to the ice melt, sea ice algae constitute an important food source for higher trophic levels. However, the total percentage that sea ice algae contribute to the primary production of a given ecosystem depends strongly on the extent of ice cover. The thickness of snow on the sea ice also affects the timing and size of the ice algae bloom by altering light transmission. This sensitivity to ice and snow cover has the potential to cause a mismatch between predators and their food-source, sea ice algae, within the ecosystem. This so called match/mismatch has been applied to a variety of systems. Examples have been seen in the relationship between zooplankton species, which rely on sea ice algae and phytoplankton for food, and juvenile walleye pollock in the Bering Sea.

==== Bloom initialization ====
There are several ways in which sea ice algal blooms are thought to start their annual cycle, and hypotheses about these vary depending on water column depth, sea ice age, and taxonomic group. Where sea ice overlays deep ocean, it is proposed that cells trapped in multiyear ice brine pockets are reconnected to the water column below and quickly colonize nearby ice of all ages. This is known as the multiyear sea ice repository hypothesis. This seeding source has been demonstrated in diatoms, which dominate sympagic blooms. Other groups, such as the dinoflagellates, which also bloom in the spring/summer, have been shown to maintain low cell numbers in the water column itself, and do not primarily overwinter within the ice. Where sea ice covers ocean that is somewhat shallower, resuspension of cells from the sediment may occur.

=== Implications of climate change ===
Climate change and warming of Arctic and Antarctic regions have the potential to greatly alter ecosystem functioning. Decreasing ice cover in polar regions is expected to lessen the relative proportion of sea ice algae production to measures of annual primary production. Thinning ice allows for greater production early in the season but early ice melting shortens the overall growing season of the sea ice algae. This melting also contributes to stratification of the water column that alters the availability of nutrients for algae growth by decreasing the depth of the surface mixed layer and inhibiting the upwelling of nutrients from deep waters. This is expected to cause an overall shift towards pelagic phytoplankton production. Changes in multiyear ice volume will also have an impact on ecosystem function in terms of bloom seeding source adjustment. Reduction in MYI, a temporal refugia for diatoms in particular, will likely alter sympagic community composition, resulting in bloom initialization that derives from species that overwinter in the water column or sediments instead.

Because sea ice algae are often the base of the food web, these alterations have implications for species of higher trophic levels. The reproduction and migration cycles of many polar primary consumers are timed with the bloom of sea ice algae, meaning that a change in the timing or location of primary production could shift the distribution of prey populations necessary for significant keystone species. Production timing may also be altered by the melting through of surface melt ponds to the seawater below, which can alter sea ice algal habitat late in the growing season in such a way as to impact grazing communities as they approach winter.

The production of DMSP by sea ice algae also plays an important role in the carbon cycle. DMSP is oxidized by other plankton to dimethylsulfide (DMS), a compound which is linked to cloud formation. Because clouds impact precipitation and the amount of solar radiation reflected back to space (albedo), this process could create a positive feedback loop. Cloud cover would increase the insolation reflected back to space by the atmosphere, potentially helping to cool the planet and support more polar habitats for sea ice algae. As of 1987, research has suggested that a doubling of cloud-condensation nuclei, of which DMS is one type, would be required to counteract warming due to increased atmospheric CO_{2} concentrations.

==== Sea ice algae as a tracer for paleoclimate ====
Sea ice plays a major role in the global climate. Satellite observations of sea ice extent date back only until the late 1970s, and longer term observational records are sporadic and of uncertain reliability. While terrestrial ice paleoclimatology can be measured directly through ice cores, historical models of sea ice must rely on proxies.

Organisms dwelling on the sea ice eventually detach from the ice and fall through the water column, particularly when the sea ice melts. A portion of the material that reaches the seafloor is buried before it is consumed and is thus preserved in the sedimentary record.

There are a number of organisms whose value as proxies for the presence of sea ice has been investigated, including particular species of diatoms, dinoflagellate cysts, ostracods, and foraminifers. Variation in carbon and oxygen isotopes in a sediment core can also be used to make inferences about sea ice extent. Each proxy has advantages and disadvantages; for example, some diatom species that are unique to sea ice are very abundant in the sediment record, however, preservation efficiency can vary.

== Terrestrial snow and ice algae ==
Lake snow and ice algae Algae can grow within and attached to lake ice as well, especially below clear, black ice. Within the ice, algae often grows in water-filled air pockets found in the slush layer formed between the ice and snow interface. For instance, the diatom species Aulacoseira baicalensis endemic to Lake Baikal can reproduce intensively in water-filled pockets within the ice as well as attached to the ice sheet. Alpine freshwater ice and snow which can last over half a year has been found to support an overall higher microbial biomass and algal activity than the lake water itself as well as specific predatory species of ciliates only found in the slush layer of the ice and snow interface. Algae living on the snowpack of ice-covered lakes may be especially rich in essential polyunsaturated fatty acids.

Snow and glacier Ice algae Algae also thrive on snow fields, glaciers and ice sheets. The species found in these habitats are distinct from those associated with sea ice because the system is freshwater and the algae are pigmented. Even within these habitats, there is a wide diversity of habitat types and algal assemblages that colonize snow and ice surfaces during melt. For example, cryosestic communities are specifically found on the surface of glaciers where the snow periodically melts during the day. Research has been done on glaciers and ice sheets across the world and several species have been identified. However, although there seems to be a wide array of species they have not been found in equal amounts. The most abundant species identified on different glaciers are the glacier ice algae Ancylonema nordenskioldii and the snow algae Chlamydomonas nivalis.

Table 1. Algae Species Composition Across Studies on Glaciers and Ice Sheets

Genus	Species	Source
Mesotaenium	bregrenii	
Ancylonema	nordenskioldii	
Cylindrocystis	brebissonii	
Chlamydomonas	nivalis	
Phromidemis	priestleyi	
Oscillatoriaceae	cyanobacterium	
Chlorooceae	cyanobacterium	
Chroococcaceae	cyanobacterium	
Chloroplastida		
Chloromonas	polyptera	
Chlamydomonas	alpina	
Chlamydomonas	tughillensis	

=== Implications for climate change ===
The rate of glacier melt depends on the surface albedo. Recent research has shown the growth of snow and glacier ice algae darkens local surface conditions, decreasing the albedo and thus increases the melt rate on these surfaces. Melting glaciers and ice sheets have been directly linked to increase in sea level rise. The second largest ice sheet is the Greenland Ice Sheet which has been retreating at alarming rates. Sea level rise will lead to an increase in both frequency and intensity of storm events.

On enduring ice sheets and snow pack, terrestrial ice algae often color the ice due to accessory pigments, popularly known as "watermelon snow". The dark pigments within the structure of algae increases sunlight absorption, leading to an increase in the melting rate. Algae blooms have been shown to appear on glaciers and ice sheets once the snow had begun to melt, which occurs when the air temperature is above the freezing point for a few days. The abundance of algae changes with the seasons and also spatially on glaciers. Their abundance is highest during the melting season of glaciers which occurs in the summer months. Climate change is affecting both the start of the melting season and also the length of this period, which will lead to an increase in the amount of algae growth.

==== Ice–albedo feedback loop (SAF) ====
As the ice/snow begins to melt the area the ice covers decreases which means a higher portion of land is exposed. The land underneath the ice has a higher rate of solar absorption due to it being less reflective and darker. Melting snow also has lower albedo than dry snow or ice because of its optical properties, so as snow begins to melt the albedo decreases, which results in more snow melting, and the loop continues. This feedback loop is referred to as the Ice–albedo feedback loop. This can have drastic effects on the amount of snow melting each season. Algae plays a role in this feedback loop by decreasing the level of albedo of the snow/ice. This growth of algae has been studied but its exact effects on decreasing albedo is still unknown.

The Black and Bloom project is conducting research to determine the amount algae are contributing to the darkening of the Greenland Ice Sheet, as well as algae's impact on the melting rates of the ice sheets. It is important to understand the extent to which algae is changing the albedo on glaciers and ice sheets. Once this is known, it should be incorporated into global climate models and then used to predict sea level rise.
