= Senator Marks (disambiguation) =

William Marks (Pennsylvania politician) (1778–1858) was a U.S. Senator from Pennsylvania from 1825 to 1831, and also served in the Pennsylvania State Senate. Senator Marks may also refer to:

- Bruce Marks (politician) (born 1957), Pennsylvania State Senate
- Jacob Marks (1861–1965), New York State Senate
- Milton Marks (1920–1998), California State Senate
