= Martin Saxe =

American lawyer and politician (1874–1967)

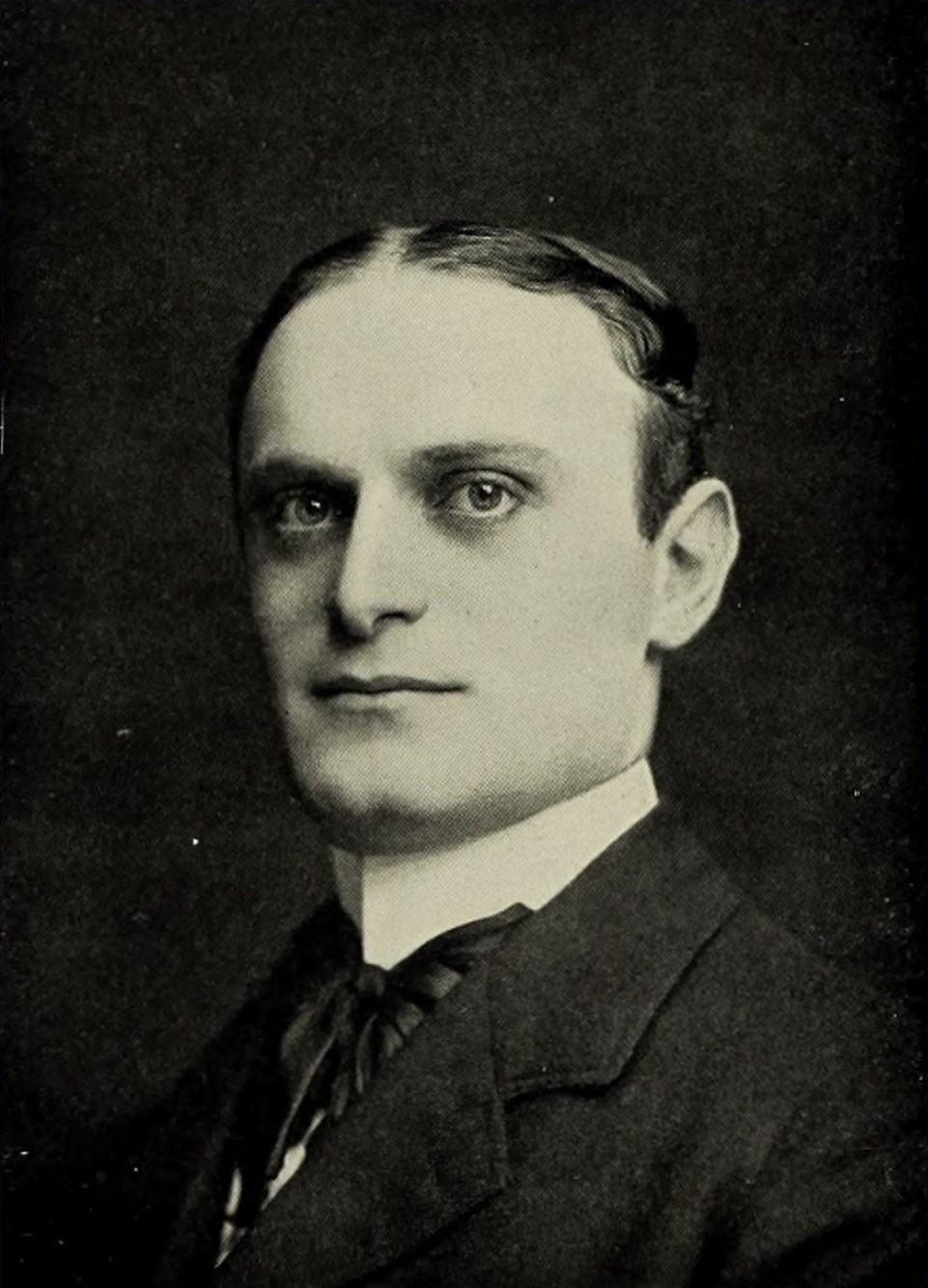
- Born: August 28, 1874; New York City, New York
- Died: February 5, 1967 (aged 92); Manhattan, New York
- Education: Princeton University (1893); New York Law School (1897)
- Occupations: Lawyer; politician

Member of the New York State Senate from the 18th district
- In office January 1, 1907 – December 31, 1908
- Preceded by: Jacob Marks
- Succeeded by: Alexander Brough

Member of the New York State Senate from the 17th district
- In office January 1, 1905 – December 31, 1906
- Preceded by: George W. Plunkitt
- Succeeded by: George B. Agnew

Martin Saxe (August 28, 1874 in New York City – February 5, 1967 in Manhattan, New York City) was an American lawyer and politician from New York.

== Life ==
He was the son of Fabian Sachs and Theresa (Helburn) Sachs. He graduated from Princeton University in 1893.

Saxe was a member of the New York State Senate from 1905 to 1908, sitting in the 128th, 129th (both 17th D.), 130th and 131st New York State Legislatures (both 18th D.).

In April 1915, he was appointed to a three-year term as Chairman of the State Tax Commission.

He died on February 5, 1967, at his home at 101 Central Park West in Manhattan.

== Sources ==
- Official New York from Cleveland to Hughes by Charles Elliott Fitch (Hurd Publishing Co., New York and Buffalo, 1911, Vol. IV; pg. 366)
- CONFIRM SAXE AND THOMAS in NYT on April 16, 1915
- MARTIN SAXE, 92, TAX LAWYER, DIES in NYT on February 6, 1967 (subscription required)

New York State Senate
Preceded by George W. Plunkitt	New York State Senate; 17th District; 1905–1906	Succeeded by George B. Agnew
Preceded by Jacob Marks	New York State Senate; 18th District; 1907–1908	Succeeded by Alexander Brough
