= Eugene S. Ives =

American politician (1859–1917)

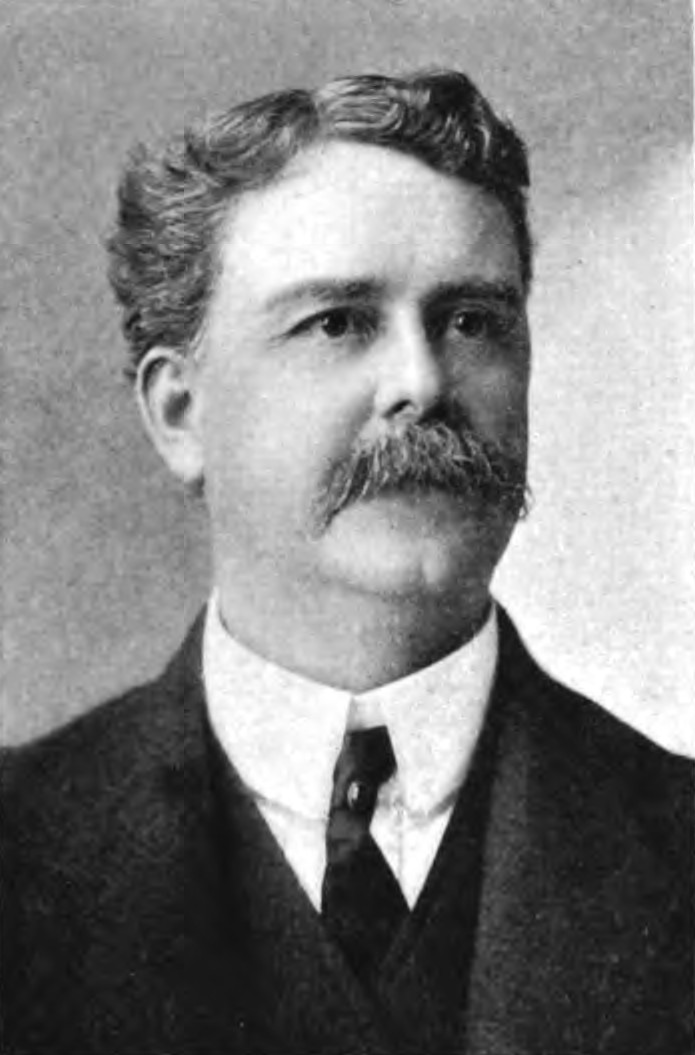
Eugene Semmes Ives

Eugene Semmes Ives (November 11, 1859 Washington, D.C. – August 25, 1917 Mist, Madera County, California) was an American lawyer and politician from New York and Arizona.

== Life ==
He was the son of Joseph Christmas Ives (1829–1868) and Cora Matilda (Semmes) Ives (1834–1916) .

He attended Georgetown College, and schools in Austria and Belgium. He graduated from Columbia Law School in 1880, was admitted to the bar, and practiced in New York City.

Ives was a member of the New York State Assembly (New York County, 19th D.) in 1885 and 1887.

He was a member of the New York State Senate (11th D.) from 1888 to 1891, sitting in the 111th, 112th, 113th and 114th New York State Legislatures. On June 5, 1889, he married Ann Maria Waggaman (1870–1951), and they had eight children.

About 1895, he removed first to California, then to the Arizona Territory, and practiced law in Yuma, and from 1901 on in Tucson. He was counsel to the Southern Pacific Railroad Company. He was a member of the Territorial Council (Yuma Co.) in the 21st Arizona Territorial Legislature (1901–1902), and was President of the Territorial Council.

He was buried at the Calvary Cemetery in Los Angeles.

== Sources ==
- The New York Red Book compiled by Edgar L. Murlin (published by James B. Lyon, Albany NY, 1897; pg. 403 and 504f)
- Biographical sketches of the members of the Legislature in The Evening Journal Almanac (1888)
- Fourth Annual Record of Assemblymen and Senators from the City of New York in the State Legislature published by the City Reform Club (1889; pg. 86ff)
- Ex-Senator E. S. Ives in NYT on August 30, 1917
- The Maryland Semmes and Kindred Families by Harry Wright Newman (1954; republished 2007; pg. 99f)
- Arizona's 21st Territorial Legislature at Arizona Memory Project

New York State Assembly
Preceded by Dow S. Kittle	New York State Assembly; New York County, 19th District; 1885	Succeeded by John McManus
Preceded by John McManus	New York State Assembly; New York County, 19th District; 1887	Succeeded by John Connelly
New York State Senate
Preceded by George W. Plunkitt	New York State Senate; 11th District; 1888–1891	Succeeded by George W. Plunkitt
