= George W. Plunkitt =

American politician

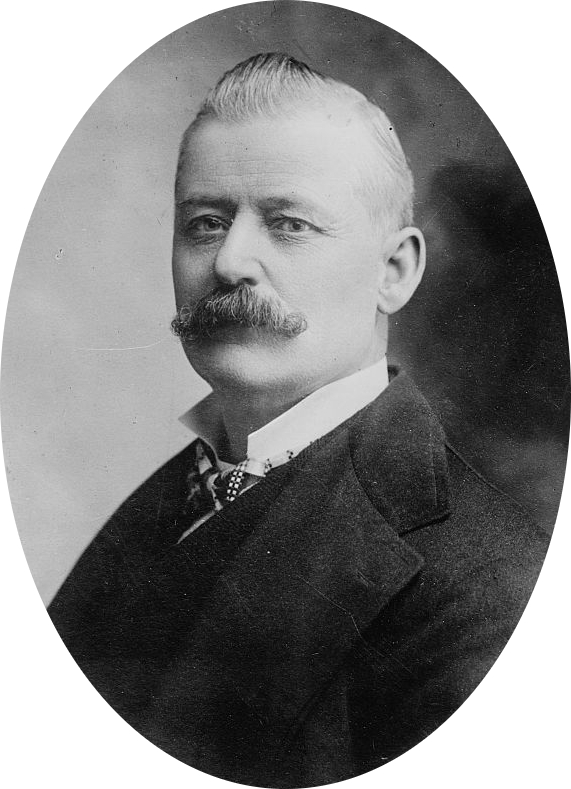

Member of the New York Senate from the 17th district
- In office January 1, 1899 – December 31, 1904
- Preceded by: Charles B. Page
- Succeeded by: Martin Saxe

Member of the New York Senate from the 11th district
- In office January 1, 1892 – December 31, 1893
- Preceded by: Eugene S. Ives
- Succeeded by: Joseph C. Wolff
- In office January 1, 1884 – December 31, 1887
- Preceded by: Frank P. Treanor
- Succeeded by: Eugene S. Ives

Member of the New York State Assembly from the 17th district
- In office January 1, 1869 – December 31, 1870
- Preceded by: Frederick H. Flagge
- Succeeded by: Edmond Connelly

Personal details
- Born: George Washington Plunkitt; November 17, 1842 Manhattan, New York City, United States
- Died: November 19, 1924 (aged 82) Manhattan, New York City, United States
- Party: Democratic
- Spouse: Mary
- Children: George Edward Plunkitt
- Parents: Patrick "Pat" Plunkitt (father); Sarah OBrien (mother)
- Relatives: Brothers: Daniel Plunkitt (his twin), James Plunkitt, Harry Plunkitt, Martin Plunkitt; Sister: Phebe Plunkitt
- Profession: Politician

George Washington Plunkitt (November 17, 1842 – November 19, 1924) was an American politician from New York State, who served in both houses of the New York State Legislature. He was a leader of the Tammany Hall political organization, a vehement critic of the Civil Service, and notably responsible for a series of colloquial and practical short talks recorded in "Plunkitt of Tammany Hall," which comprise his observations and successful mastery of machine politics.

== Biography ==
He was born on November 17, 1842, in Manhattan, New York City.

Years later Plunkitt recalled that he was born on "Nanny Goat Hill", just "twenty feet inside the Central Park wall at [West] 84th Street...."

He served in the New York State Assembly (New York Co., 17th D.) between 1869 and 1873.

He was a member of the New York State Senate from 1884 to 1887 (11th D.), in 1892 and 1893 (11th D.), and from 1899 to 1904 (17th D.). He sat in the 107th, 108th, 109th, 110th, 115th, 116th, 122nd, 123rd, 124th, 125th, 126th, and 127th New York State Legislatures.

George Washington Plunkitt, center

Plunkitt became wealthy by practicing what he called "honest graft" in politics. He was a cynically honest practitioner of what today is generally known as "machine politics," patronage-based and frank in its exercise of power for personal gain.

In one of his speeches, quoted in Plunkitt of Tammany Hall, he describes the difference between dishonest and honest graft. For dishonest graft, one works solely for one's own interests. For honest graft, one pursues, at the same time, the interests of one's party, state, and person.

He made most of his money through the purchase of land that he knew would be needed for public projects. He would buy such parcels and then resell them at an inflated price. This was honest graft. Dishonest graft, according to Plunkitt, would be buying land and then using influence to have a project built on it.

Plunkitt defended his own actions, saying: "I could get nothin' at a bargain but a big piece of swamp, but I took it fast enough and held on to it. What turned out was just what I counted on. They couldn't make the park complete without Plunkitt's swamp, and they had to pay a good price for it. Anything dishonest in that?"

Plunkitt was also a thoroughgoing party man, believing in appointments, patronage, spoils, and all of the practices curtailed by the civil service law. He saw such practices as both the rewards and cause of patriotism. He hated the civil service system and fought against it politically.

Plunkitt is also remembered for the line he used to defend his actions: "I seen my opportunities and I took 'em."

On October 7, 1905, he underwent an operation for retro-peritoneal abscess, and almost died.

He died on November 19, 1924, in Manhattan, New York City. He was buried at the Calvary Cemetery in Queens.

New York State Assembly
Preceded by Frederick H. Flagge	New York State Assembly; New York County, 17th District; 1869–1870	Succeeded by Edmond Connelly
New York State Senate
Preceded by Frank P. Treanor	New York State Senate; 11th District; 1884–1887	Succeeded by Eugene S. Ives
Preceded by Eugene S. Ives	New York State Senate; 11th District; 1892–1893	Succeeded by Joseph C. Wolff
Preceded by Charles B. Page	New York State Senate; 17th District; 1899–1904	Succeeded by Martin Saxe
