= Charles B. Page =

American lawyer and politician from New York

Charles Benjamin Page (November 4, 1851 – August 13, 1912) was an American lawyer and politician from New York.

== Life ==
Page was born on November 4, 1851, in Olean, New York, the son of Rufus L. Page and Elizabeth A. Hall.

Page studied in Olean Academy and a private school in New Marlboro, Massachusetts. He moved to New York City in 1870 and began studying law, first under Addison G. Rice and then with Judge Freeman J. Fithian. He was admitted to the bar in 1876. From 1876 to 1886, he associated with Fithian. In 1886, he became the member of the law firm Secor & Page.

In 1895, Page was elected to the New York State Senate as a Republican, representing New York's 17th State Senate district. He served in the Senate in 1896, 1897, and 1898. In 1900, State Comptroller William J. Morgan appointed him tax appraiser. He was also appointed to the New York City Board of Elections that year. He was a delegate to the 1904 and 1908 Republican National Conventions.

Page was a member of the Freemasons.

Page died at home on August 13, 1912. He was buried in Mount View Cemetery in Olean.

New York State Senate
Preceded by Jacob Rice	New York State Senate; 17th District; 1896–1898	Succeeded by George W. Plunkitt
