= Joseph C. Wolff =

American politician

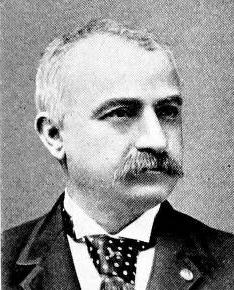
Joseph C. Wolff (1893)

Joseph C. Wolff (January 19, 1849 in Besançon, France – November 26, 1896 in New York City) was an American lawyer and politician from New York.

== Life ==
The family emigrated to the United States in 1855, and settled in New York City. He attended the grammar schools. In 1864, he enlisted in the 2nd New York Light Cavalry Regiment as a bugler, and took part in the battles of Opequon, Cedar Creek and Five Forks.

He graduated from Columbia Law School in 1874, was admitted to the bar, and practiced law in New York City.

Wolff was a member of the New York State Assembly (New York Co., 16th D.) in 1893; and of the New York State Senate (11th D.) in 1894 and 1895. In 1896, he was appointed as Clerk of the Seventh District Court.

He died on November 26, 1896, at his home, at 168 East 61st Street in New York City, "after a lingering illness".

== Sources ==
- The New York Red Book compiled by Edgar L. Murlin (published by James B. Lyon, Albany NY, 1897; pg. 404 and 510)
- Sketches of the members of the Legislature in The Evening Journal Almanac (1895; pg. 49)
- DEATH LIST OF A DAY; Joseph C. Wolff in NYT on November 29, 1896

New York State Assembly
Preceded by Walter G. Byrne	New York State Assembly; New York County, 16th District; 1893	Succeeded by Victor J. Dowling
New York State Senate
Preceded by George W. Plunkitt	New York State Senate; 11th District; 1894–1895	Succeeded by Timothy D. Sullivan
