= Frank P. Treanor =

American politician

Frank P. Treanor (May 11, 1855 in New York City – August 9, 1933 in Monument Beach, Barnstable County, Massachusetts) was an American businessman and politician from New York.

== Life ==
He attended the College of St. Francis Xavier, and the College of the Holy Cross.

He was a member of the New York State Assembly (New York Co., 17th D.) in 1880. In 1882, he became a partner in his older brother's bluestone business in Hastings-on-Hudson. He was a member of the New York State Senate (11th D.) in 1882 and 1883.

In 1886, he removed to Yonkers, and was Police Commissioner of Yonkers for some time.

He was a business partner of William H. Clark who built the Empire Race Track, and was Superintendent of the track at the time of Clark's death.

Treanor died on August 9, 1933, during a summer vacation at Monument Beach, Massachusetts.

== Sources ==
- Civil List and Constitutional History of the Colony and State of New York compiled by Edgar Albert Werner (1884; pg. 291)
- Sketches of the Members of the Legislatures in The Evening Journal Almanac (1883)
- WILLIAM H. CLARK DEAD in NYT on February 18, 1900
- F. P. Treanor, Formerly Of Hastings, Dies in The Hastings News on August 11, 1933

New York State Assembly
| Preceded by Stephen N. Simonson | New York State Assembly; New York County, 17th District; 1880 | Succeeded by James Fanning |
New York State Senate
| Preceded by George H. Forster | New York State Senate; 11th District; 1882–1883 | Succeeded by George W. Plunkitt |
