= William M. Bennett =

American lawyer and politician (1869–1930)

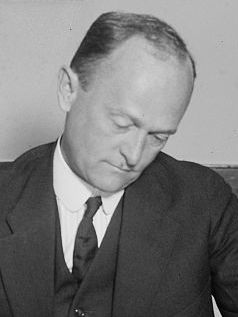

Personal details
- Born: William Mason Bennett; July 11, 1869 Nashville, Tennessee, U.S.
- Died: January 16, 1930 (aged 60) Manhattan, New York City, U.S.
- Party: Republican
- Education: Oberlin College; Columbia Law School

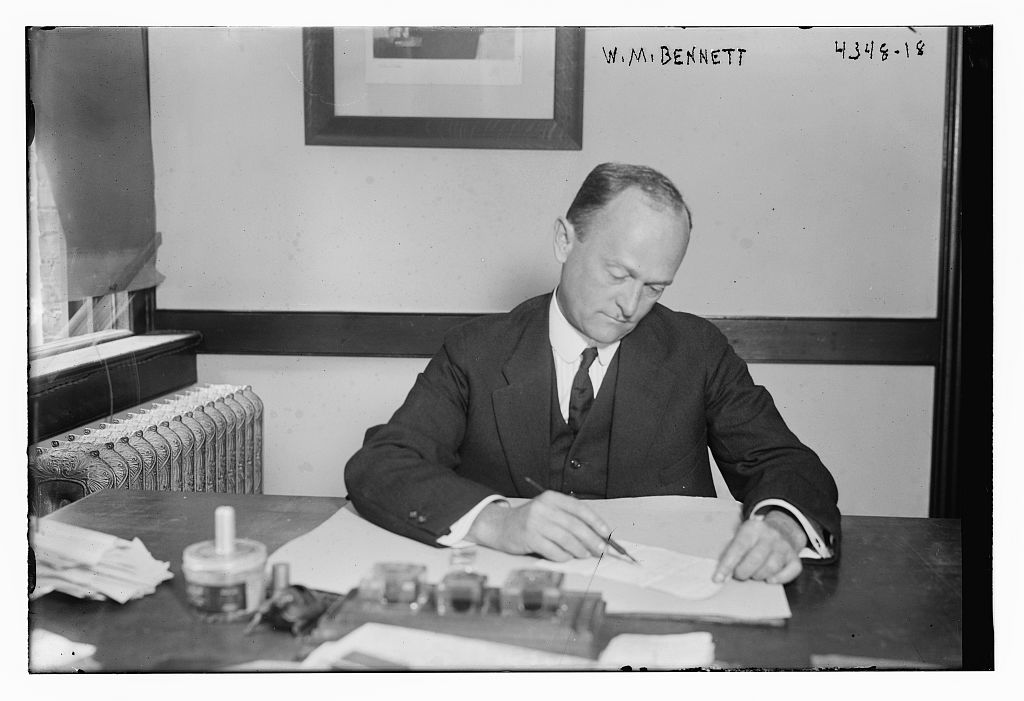
William Mason Bennett in 1917

William Mason Bennett (July 11, 1869 in Nashville, Tennessee – January 16, 1930 in Manhattan, New York City) was an American lawyer and politician from New York.

== Life ==
He graduated from Oberlin College in 1890, and from Columbia Law School in 1893.

Bennett was a member of the New York State Assembly (New York County, 15th D.) in 1908, 1909 and 1910.

He was a member of the New York State Senate (18th D.) in 1915 and 1916. In 1916, he ran in the Republican primary election for Governor of New York, but was defeated by the incumbent Governor Charles S. Whitman.

In 1917, Bennett won the Republican nomination for Mayor of New York City, defeating the incumbent Mayor John Purroy Mitchel. At the New York City mayoral election, 1917, Bennett came in fourth, behind Democrat John F. Hylan, Mitchel (who ran as an Independent) and Socialist Morris Hillquit.

In 1918 and 1920, Bennett ran in the Republican primaries for Lieutenant Governor of New York, but was defeated twice again.

On January 15, 1930, he suffered a stroke in his law office at 15 William Street, and died the next day in Broad Street Hospital in Manhattan.

== Sources ==
- Official New York from Cleveland to Hughes by Charles Elliott Fitch (Hurd Publishing Co., New York and Buffalo, 1911, Vol. IV; pg. 355, 357 and 359)
- WHITMAN HEADS TICKET in NYT on August 15, 1918
- MARTYR AND HAND-PICKED in NYT on August 18, 1918
- W. M. BENNETT DIES AT 60 AFTER STROKE in NYT on January 17, 1930 (subscription required)
- W. M. BENNETT LEFT $500 ESTATE HERE in NYT on January 25, 1930 (subscription required)

New York State Assembly
Preceded by Mervin C. Stanley	New York State Assembly; New York County, 15th District; 1908–1910	Succeeded by Ashton Parker
New York State Senate
Preceded by Henry W. Pollock	New York State Senate; 18th District; 1915–1916	Succeeded by Albert Ottinger
