= Alexander Brough =

Scottish-American lawyer and politician

Alexander Brough (January 25, 1863 – February 27, 1940) was a Scottish-American lawyer and politician from New York.

== Life ==
He was born in Glasgow, Scotland to Alexander Brough and Jane Dandie Brough. He emigrated to the United States in 1872, and settled in Providence, Rhode Island. He attended Brown University, and graduated from Amherst College in 1887 and then graduated from Columbia Law School in 1889.

Brough was a member of the New York State Assembly (New York Co., 19th D.) in 1907. That same year, he represented typewriter inventor James Bartlett Hammond during his three trials for lunacy.

He was a member of the New York State Senate (18th D.) in 1909 and 1910.

In 1916, he was appointed by Mayor John Purroy Mitchel as a City Magistrate. Brough retired from the bench in June 1939.

== Death ==
He died on February 27, 1940, at his home at 31 West 12th Street in Manhattan, from pneumonia.

== Sources ==
- Official New York from Cleveland to Hughes by Charles Elliott Fitch (Hurd Publishing Co., New York and Buffalo, 1911, Vol. IV; pg. 354 and 367)
- ALEX. BROUGH, 77, AN EX-MAGISTRATE in NYT on February 28, 1940 (subscription required)

New York State Assembly
Preceded by Mervin C. Stanley	New York State Assembly; New York County, 19th District; 1907	Succeeded by William B. Donihee
New York State Senate
Preceded by Martin Saxe	New York State Senate; 18th District; 1909–1910	Succeeded by Henry W. Pollock
