= Henry W. Pollock =

American politician

Henry W. Pollock (October 22, 1878 in New York City – December 9, 1954 in Manhattan, New York City) was an American lawyer and politician from New York.

== Life ==
Born in what is now the Bronx, Pollock graduated from Columbia Law School with an LL.B. in 1901. Following his graduation, he practiced as an associate in the firm of Stern, Signer & Baer for six years. In January, 1908, he became a partner in the firm of Sternberg, Jacobson & Pollock, which became Jacobson & Pollock in June 1917 after Samuel H. Sternberg left the firm.

He was a member of the New York State Senate (18th D.) from 1911 to 1914, sitting in the 134th, 135th, 136th and 137th New York State Legislatures.

Pollock was a vice president and head of the legal department of the Bank of United States from October 1, 1927 to the time of the bank's failure in 1930.

He died on December 9, 1954, at his home at 16 West 77th Street in Manhattan, of a heart attack.

New York State Senate
Preceded by Alexander Brough	New York State Senate; 18th District; 1911–1914	Succeeded by William M. Bennett
