= Sympagic ecology =

Ecology of ice and snow

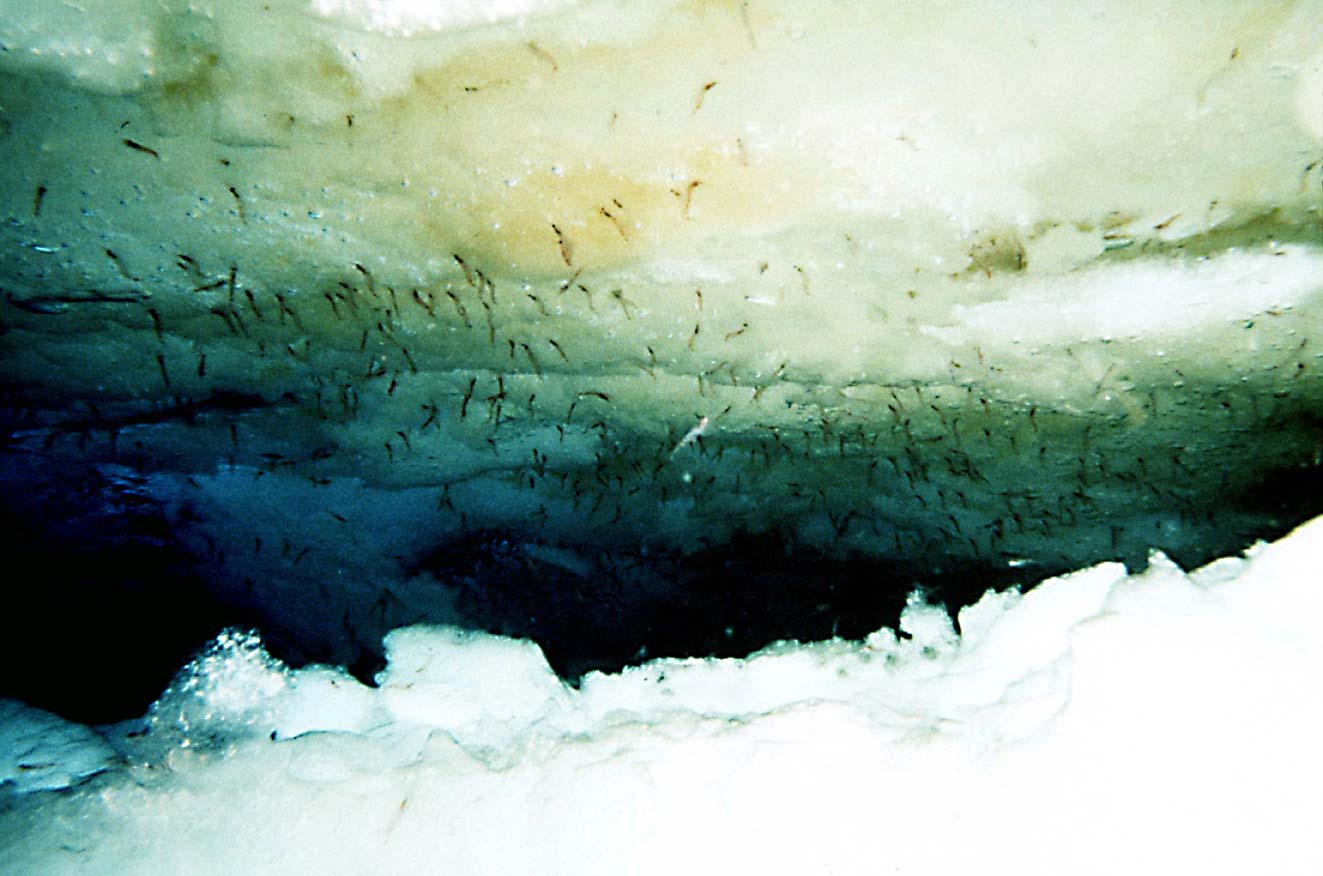
ROV image of krill grazing under the ice. In this image most krill swim in an upside down position directly under the ice. Only one animal (in the middle) is hovering in the open water.

A sympagic environment is one where water exists mostly as a solid, ice, such as a polar ice cap or glacier. Solid sea ice is permeated with channels filled with salty brine. These briny channels and the sea ice itself have its ecology, referred to as "sympagic ecology".

Residents of temperate or tropical climates often assume, mistakenly, that ice and snow are devoid of life. In fact, a number of varieties of algae such as diatoms engage in photosynthesis in arctic and alpine regions of Earth. Other energy sources include Aeolian dust and pollen swept in from other regions. These ecosystems also include bacteria and fungi, as well as animals like flatworms and crustaceans. A number of sympagic worm species are commonly called ice worms.

Additionally, the ocean has abundant plankton, and prolific algal blooms occur in the polar regions each summer as well as in high mountain lakes, bringing nutrients to those parts of the ice in contact with the water. In the Arctic Ocean, ice algae accounts for close to half of the primary production during the summer months. In the spring, krill can scrape off the green lawn of ice algae from the underside of the pack ice.

== Endemic species in the Arctic ==
The Arctic sea ice and its related biota are unique, and the year-round persistence of the ice has allowed the development of ice endemic species. The specialized sympagic community within the sea ice is found in the tiny liquid filled network of pores and brine channels or at the ice-water interface. The organisms living within the sea ice are consequently small (<1mm), and dominated by bacteria, and unicellular plants and animals.

Diatoms are considered the most important primary producers inside the ice with more than 200 species occurring in Arctic sea ice. In addition, flagellates contribute to biodiversity. Protozoan and metazoan ice meiofauna, in particular turbellarians, nematodes, crustaceans and rotifers, can be abundant in all ice types year-round. In spring, larvae and juveniles of benthic animals (e.g. polychaetes and molluscs) migrate into coastal fast ice to feed on the ice algae for a few weeks.

A partially endemic fauna, comprising mainly gammaridean amphipods, thrives at the underside of ice floes. Locally and seasonally occurring at several hundred individuals per square meter, they are important mediators for particulate organic matter from the sea ice to the water column. Ice-associated and pelagic crustaceans are the major food sources for polar cod (Boreogadus saida) that occurs in close association with sea ice and acts as the major link from the ice-related food web to seals and whales.

While previous studies of coastal and offshore sea ice provided a glimpse of the seasonal and regional abundances and the diversity of the ice-associated biota, biodiversity in these communities is virtually unknown for all groups, from bacteria to metazoans. Many taxa are likely still undiscovered due to the methodological problems in analyzing ice samples. The study of diversity of ice related environments is urgently required before they ultimately change with altering ice regimes and the likely loss of the multi-year ice cover.

== See also ==
- Polar ecology
- Polynya
