= Jacob Marks =

American politician

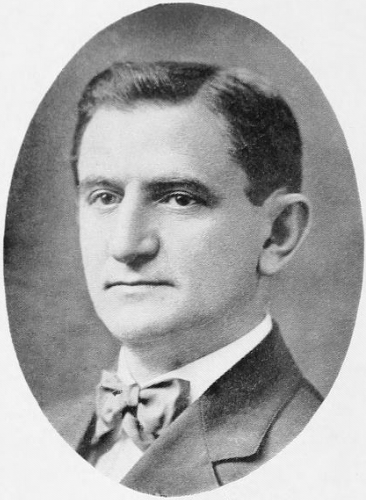

Member of the New York State Senate
- In office 1905–1906
- Constituency: 18th district

Personal details
- Born: June 24, 1861 New York, New York, US
- Died: March 20, 1965 (aged 103) New York, New York, US
- Party: Democratic
- Spouse: Henrietta Barnet (m. 1884)
- Children: 3
- Occupation: Lawyer, politician, judge

Jacob Marks (June 24, 1861 – March 20, 1965) was a Jewish-American lawyer, politician, and judge from New York.

== Life ==
Marks was born on June 24, 1861, in New York City, New York, the son of Wolff Marks and Henrietta Rothschild.

Marks attended public school and classes with the Cooper Union. He studied law in the office of Daniel P. Hays. He later studied with the firm Hays & Greenbaum, which included Hays and future New York Supreme Court Justice Samuel Greenbaum. He was admitted to the bar in 1882 and began practicing law in New York City. By 1905, he was a member of the law firm Marks & Wielar, with offices in 156 Broadway. He was counsel in many leading cases involving important questions on commercial, corporation, negligence, and real estate law, and was involved in a number of contested election cases. He was counsel for the successful party in a case regarding a seat in the New York City Board of Aldermen, in which the Court of Appeals ruled the Board of Aldermen had the power to go behind election results and decide who was elected to the Board.

Marks was a delegate to the 1894 New York State Constitutional Convention. In the convention, he was the leading advocate for the Extension of the System of Trial by Jury and introduced a constitutional amendment that provided for the constitutional right to a jury trial in proceedings in which the Legislature has the power to abridge that right. A member of Tammany Hall since he was twenty-one, he was a secretary of the Tammany Hall County General Committee for many years, a member of the Law Committee, Secretary of the Twentieth Assembly District General Committee, Chairman of the Twenty-sixth Assembly District General Committee since it was organized, and a director of the Delaware Club, the Democratic organization for the Twenty-Sixth Twenty-sixth district. In 1898, Mayor Robert Anderson Van Wyck appointed him an Inspector of Public Schools in New York City for a four-year term. In 1904, he was elected to the New York State Senate as a Democrat, representing New York's 18th State Senate district (the 24th, 26th, and 28th New York County Assembly Districts). He served in the Senate in 1905 and 1906. In 1905, he was the first member of the Senate to introduce legislation for a legislative investigation into the life insurance companies. He was subsequently appointed to the Insurance Investigation Committee, which was aided by its counsel Charles Evans Hughes, and the committee reported favorably to many of the reforms Marks previously urged.

In 1907, Marks was elected Justice of the Municipal Court for a ten-year term. He was re-elected to the Court in 1917. He served on the Municipal Court until 1928. He then worked as a referee for the New York Supreme Court. He was still working as referee in 1960, when he was nearly 100.

Marks was a member of the Montefiore Home, the YMHA, the Freemasons, the Royal Arcanum, the Hebrew Orphan Asylum, and the Educational Alliance. He attended the Central Synagogue. In 1884, he married Henrietta Barnet. Their children were Dora, Irene, and Josephine.

Marks died in New York City on March 20, 1965. He was the last surviving delegate of the 1894 New York State Constitutional Convention.

New York State Senate
Preceded by Victor J. Dowling	New York State Senate; 18th District; 1905–1906	Succeeded by Martin Saxe
