= Watermelon snow =

Red coloration effect caused by algae

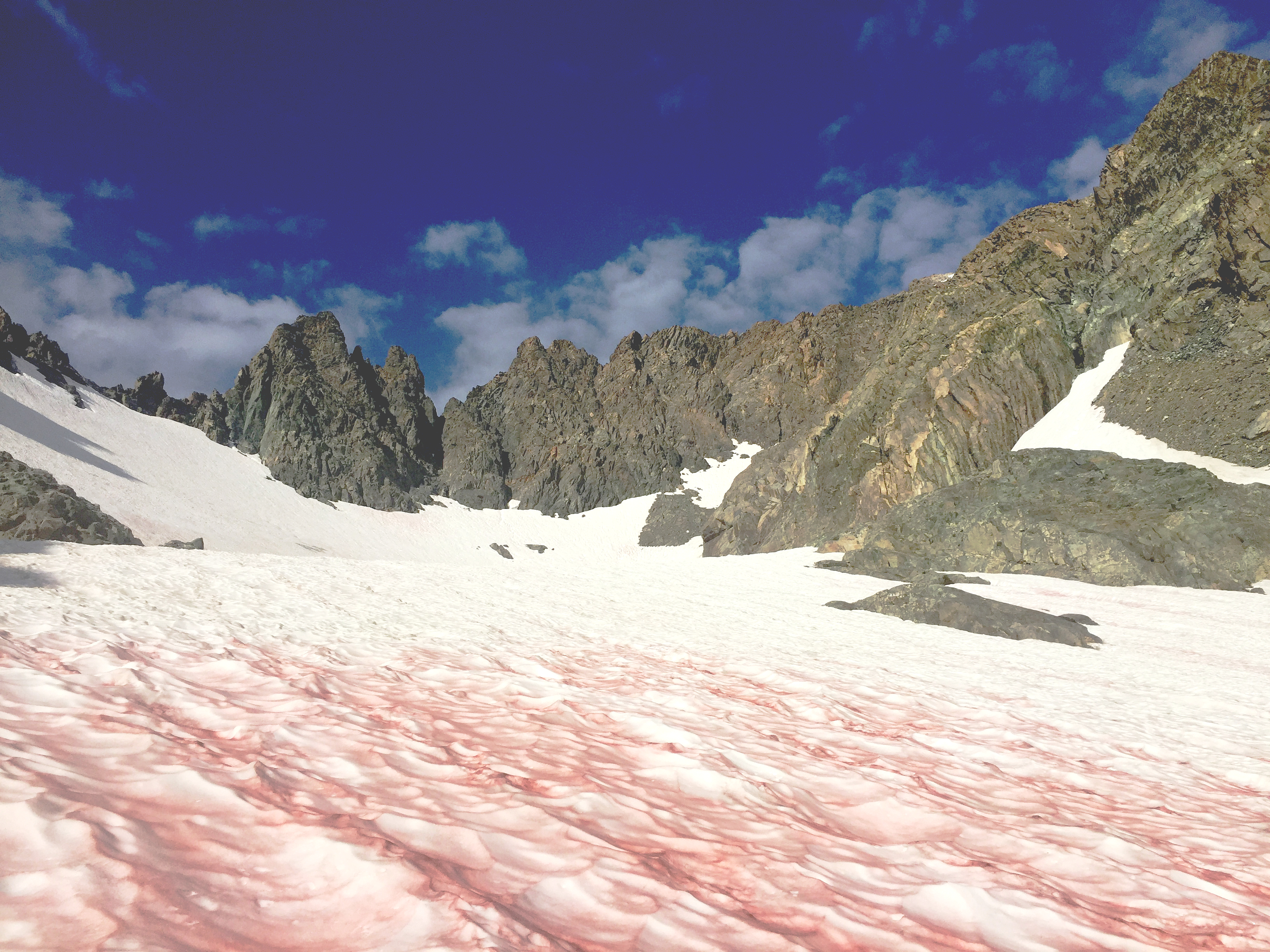
Watermelon snow on Mount Ritter in California

Watermelon snow, also called snow algae, pink snow, red snow, or blood snow, is a phenomenon caused by Chlamydomonas nivalis, a species of green algae containing a secondary red carotenoid pigment (astaxanthin) in addition to chlorophyll. Unlike most species of fresh-water algae, this species appears to be cryophilic (cold-loving) and thrives in freezing water.

This type of snow is common during the summer in alpine and coastal polar regions worldwide, such as the Sierra Nevada of California. Here, at altitudes of 10,000 to 12,000 feet (3,000–3,600 m), the temperature is cold throughout the year, and so the snow has lingered from winter storms. Compressing the snow by stepping on it or making snowballs leaves it looking red. Walking on watermelon snow often results in getting bright red soles and pink trouser cuffs.

Snow algae dominates glacial biomass immediately after the onset of melting, and its pigmentation can significantly darken the surface of a glacier. This plays a substantial role in glacial melt.

== History ==
The earliest accounts of watermelon snow are in the writings of Aristotle. Watermelon snow has puzzled mountain climbers, explorers, and naturalists for thousands of years, some speculating that it was caused by mineral deposits or oxidation products that were leached from rocks.

In May 1818, four ships sailed from England to search for the Northwest Passage and chart the Arctic coastline of North America. Severe weather made them finally turn the ships back, but the expedition made valuable contributions to science. Captain John Ross noticed crimson snow that streaked the white cliffs like streams of blood as they were rounding Cape York on the northwest coast of Greenland. A landing party stopped and brought back samples to England. The Times wrote about this discovery on December 4, 1818:

Captain Sir John Ross has brought from Baffin's Bay a quantity of red snow, or rather snow-water, which has been submitted to chymical analysis in this country, in order to the discovery of the nature of its colouring matter. Our credulity is put to an extreme test upon this occasion, but we cannot learn that there is any reason to doubt the fact as stated. Sir John Ross did not see any red snow fall; but he saw large tracts overspread with it. The colour of the fields of snow was not uniform; but, on the contrary, there were patches or streaks more or less red, and of various depths of tint. The liquor, or dissolved snow, is of so dark a red as to resemble red port wine. It is stated, that the liquor deposits a sediment; and that the question is not answered, whether that sediment is of an animal or vegetable nature. It is suggested that the colour is derived from the soil on which the snow falls: in this case, no red snow can have been seen on the ice.

A follow-up article three days later erroneously concluded that the coloration was caused by meteoric iron deposits:

Some doubt has been expressed as to the red snow observed by Sir John Ross and his associates in the newly discovered arctic region; but when it is known that the iron which was also found there, lying on the surface, in heaps, and in considerable quantities, was all meteoric, the doubt will cease, and the fact will admit of an easy solution. Sir John Ross brought home small specimens of this iron, which has been subjected by Mr. Professor Brande to the usual tests, and it is found to be precisely of the kind of the meteoric stones that occasionally fall in more southern latitudes. It is impregnated with nickel, which is never found in earth iron. That, therefore, which loads the atmosphere with the fluid which composes this meteoric iron, serves to colour the snow; iron being found to be the colourist of all metallic as well as vegetable matter.

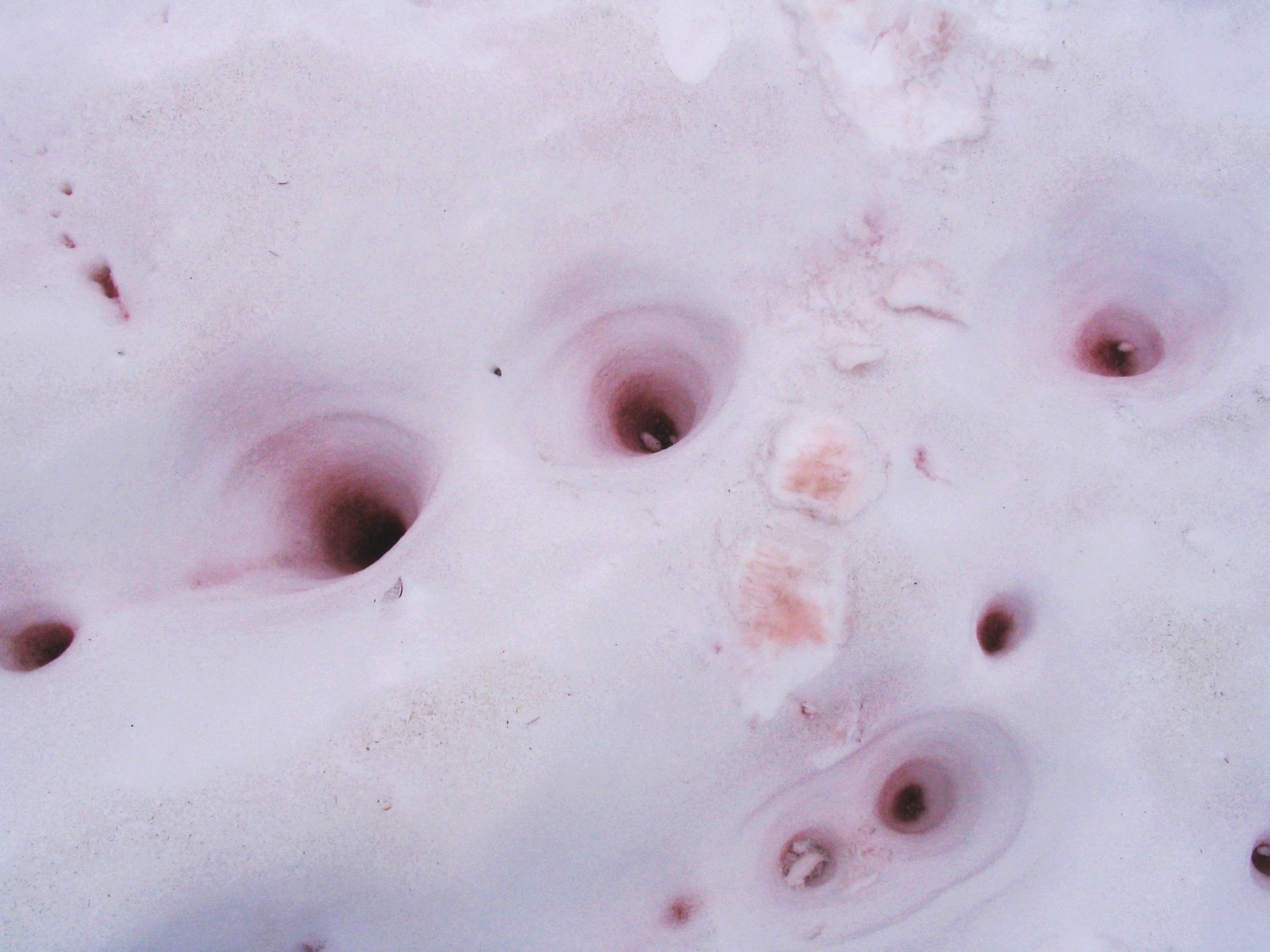
Unusual watermelon snow pits, superimposed with an orange-ish bootprint

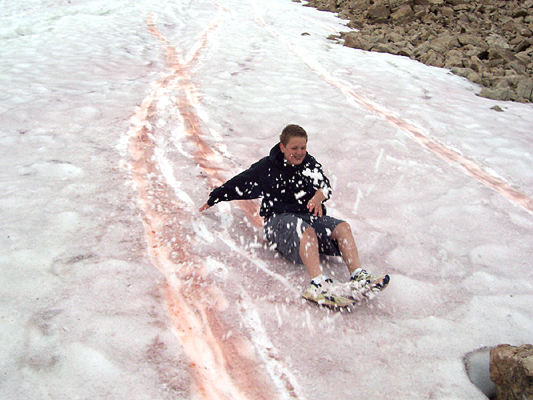
Tracks made by sliding on watermelon snow in Utah's Uinta Mountains

When Ross published his account of the voyage in 1818, it contained a botanical appendix by Robert Brown. In it, Brown tentatively attributed the red snow to an alga.

The phenomenon was also reported from the Scottish Highlands in the nineteenth century and subsequently recorded scientifically from a snowpatch in the Cairngorm Mountains in 1967.

== Chlamydomonas nivalis and its new genus Sanguina ==
The name Chlamydomonas nivalis has been associated with the phenomenon of red snow for the last 200 years, yet, a latest study shows that the alga responsible for most of the red snow fields does not belong to the genus Chlamydomonas, but had to be placed in a separate, new genus, Sanguina. This genus contains two species, S. nivaloides producing red snow, and S. aurantia causing orange snow. All snow algae producing red or orange snow are actually green alga that owe their red color to a bright red carotenoid pigment, which protects the chloroplast from intense visible and also ultraviolet radiation, as well as absorbing heat, which provides the alga with liquid water as the snow melts around it. Algal blooms may extend to a depth of 25 cm (10 inches), with each cell measuring about 20 to 30 micrometers in diameter, about four times the diameter of a human red blood cell. It has been calculated that a teaspoon of melted snow contains a million or more cells. The algae sometimes accumulate in "sun cups", which are shallow depressions in the snow. The carotenoid pigment absorbs heat and as a result it deepens the sun cups, and accelerates the melting rate of glaciers and snowbanks.

During the winter months, when snow covers them, the algae become dormant. In spring, nutrients, increased levels of light and meltwater, stimulate germination. Once they germinate, the resting cells release smaller green flagellate cells which travel towards the surface of the snow. Once the flagellated cells reach the surface, they may lose their flagellae and form aplanospores, or thick-walled resting cells, or they may function as gametes, fusing in pairs to form zygotes.

Many species feed on C. nivalis/Sanguina spp., including protozoans such as ciliates, rotifers, nematodes, ice worms and springtails.

== See also ==
- Blood rain
- Ice algae: algal communities encountered in annual and multi-year sea-ice.
- Pink lake
