= Israel Perkins Warren =

American minister (1814–1892)

Israel Perkins Warren (April 8, 1814 – October 9, 1892) was an American minister, editor, and author.

Warren, the eldest of seven children of Isaac and Leonora (Perkins) Warren, was born in that part of Woodbridge which is now Bethany, Connecticut, on April 8, 1814. In 1830 he was apprenticed to a tailor in what is now Naugatuck, Connecticut.; but having in the spring of 1831 become a Christian, he was led to decide to study for the ministry, and was released by his employer for this purpose. He graduated from Yale College in 1838. During part of his Senior year and for a year from graduation, he taught in an academy in what is now Cromwell, Conn., and for two years after graduation, he studied in the Yale Divinity School.

In August, 1841, he began to supply the pulpit of the Congregational Church in Granby, Conn., where he was ordained as pastor on April 20, 1842. His dismission from this charge, at his own request, took effect on May 1, 1845. From July 8, 1846, to September 23, 1851, he was pastor of the Congregational Church at Mount Carmel, in the township of Hamden, Conn.. From October 2, 1851, to February 3, 1856, he held the same relation in Plymouth, Conn. In June, 1856, he accepted an appointment as one of the Corresponding Secretaries of the American Seamen's Friend Society in New York City. In May, 1859, he was chosen Secretary of the American Tract Society at Boston, and served in that office and as editor of the Society's publications until Jan. 1, 1869. After resigning this position, he formed a partnership with his former parishioner, Gen. Erastus Blakeslee, for the publication and sale of books.

In the fall of 1875 he removed to Maine to edit The Christian Mirror, the organ of the Congregational Churches of that State. On April 1, 1877, he purchased the paper, and he continued as its editor and proprietor until his death, at his home in Portland, after some months of feebleness, on October 9, 1892, aged 78 years.

The degree of Doctor of Divinity was conferred on him by Iowa College in 1868. He did a large amount of editorial work while connected with the Tract Society, much of the material published being from his own pen. Besides other periodicals, he edited for three years (1867–69) The Sabbath at Home, an illustrated monthly magazine of a high order. His published volumes numbered over twenty; among which are especially to be noted, The Four Gospels and Acts, with Notes, 1871; The Three Judges, 1873, The Parousia, 1879; and The Stanley Families of America, 1887.

On August 25, 1841, he married Jane S., second daughter of Captain Thomas Stow, of Cromwell, Conn., who died on February 26, 1881. Their children were two daughters who died in infancy, and one son (Yale College 1869). He next married, on January 2, 1882, Sarah, daughter of Captain John L. Lewis, and widow of Henry Cushman, of Portland, who died on November 26, 1885. On October 6, 1886, he married Juliet M., daughter of Dr. Albert F. Stanley, of Winthrop, Me, who survived him.
