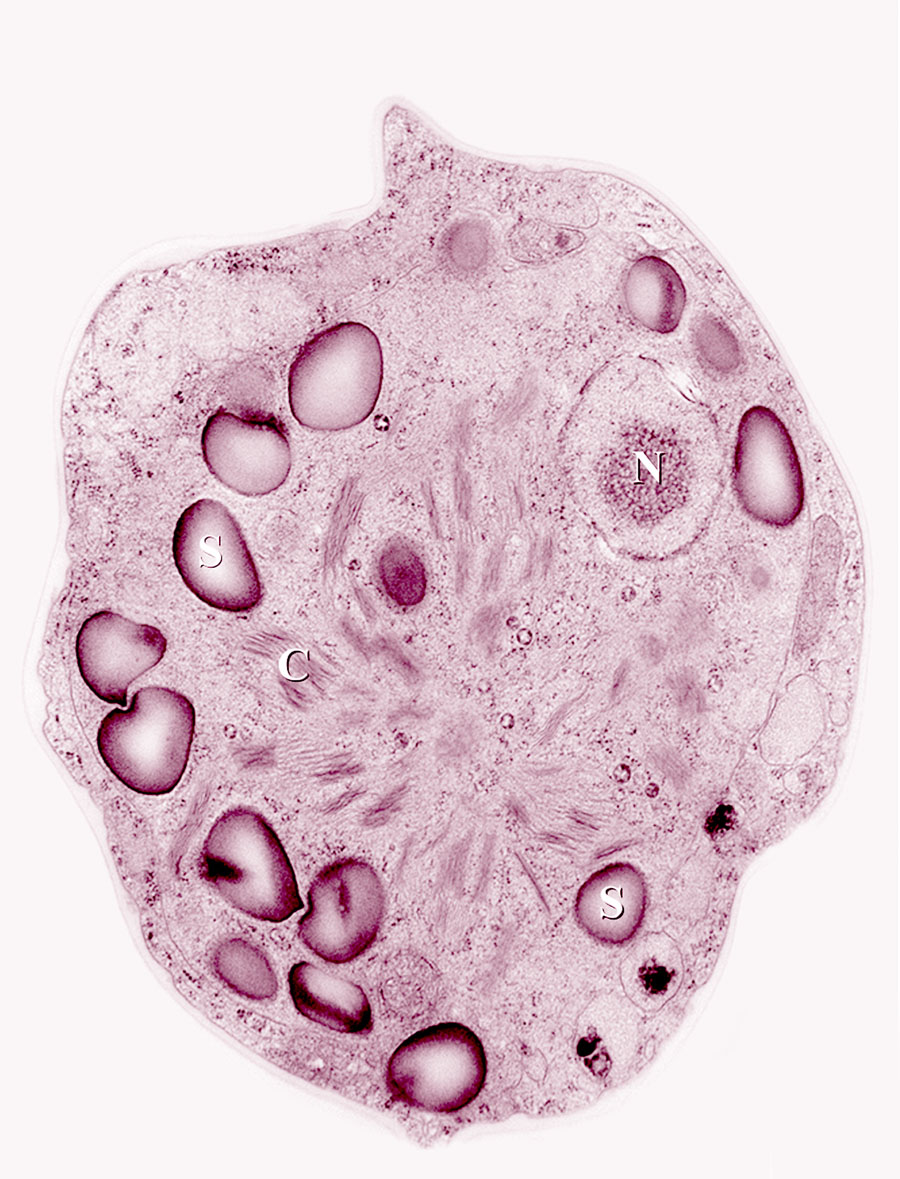

Scientific classification
- Domain: Eukaryota
- Supergroup: Archaeplastida
- Clade: Viridiplantae
- Division: Chlorophyta
- Class: Chlorophyceae
- Order: Chlamydomonadales
- Family: Chlamydomonadaceae
- Genus: Chlamydomonas
- Species: C. nivalis

Binomial name
- Chlamydomonas nivalis (Bauer) Wille

Synonyms
- Chloromonas typhlos; Chloromonas reticula; Uredo nivalis; Sphaerella nivalis; Protococcus nivalis; Haematococcus nivalis

= Chlamydomonas nivalis =

Species of alga

Chlamydomonas nivalis, commonly known as snow algae, also referred to as Chloromonas typhlos, is a unicellular red-coloured photosynthetic green alga. It is found in the snowfields of the alps and polar regions all over the world and on all seven continents. There are four known genera causing red snow: Sanguina, Chlainomonas, Chlamydomonas, and Chloromonas. Chlamydomonas nivalis is one of the primary algae responsible for causing the phenomenon of watermelon snow (also blood snow, raspberry snow), where patches of snow appear red or pink. The first account of microbial communities that form red snow was made by Aristotle. Researchers have been active in studying this organism for over 100 years.

This alga is an interesting organism for researchers in various fields to study due to its possible role in lowering global albedo, ability to survive in extreme environments, and production of commercially relevant compounds. Additionally, its life cycle is still being studied today in an effort to better understand this organism and amend previous classification errors.

== Etymology ==
The name Chlamydomonas nivalis is of compound Greek and Latin origin. Chlamydomonas is ultimately derived from the Ancient Greek χλαμύς (khlamús, "cloak, mantle") and μονάς (monás, "solitary"), while nivalis, from the Latin nivālis, translates to 'found growing in or near snow', as this species of algae are only found associated with snow or near snowy areas.

== Morphology ==
It is a green alga with a motile vegetative stage of about 10-12µm long, alike classical Chloromonas morphology.

== Dispersal ==
While snow algae are considered to be a cosmopolitan species and Chlamydomonas nivalis has been observed across bipolar regions, the mechanisms behind their dispersal and migrations are not clear. Additional research across latitude-ranges of red snow patches on glacial and snow fields will be advantageous in understanding the colonizing habits of snow algae.

== Description ==
The seasonal life cycle of C. nivalis can be broken down to three stages based on the color of the cell as a result of carotenoid composition, which are green, orange, and red. Orange cells and red cells are the most difficult to differentiate as they look similar while the red and green cells are easiest to differentiate as they have more significant differences in composition. Cells at the red stage were previously described as a separate species than the green cells, but were later discovered to be different stages of the C. nivalis' complex life cycle.

Small green coloured motile cells of the young C. nivalis at the green stage are produced in spring or early summer when temperatures are warmer and zygotes undergo meiosis in meltwater pools. The biflagellated cells are slightly oval and about 5-15 μm in diameter. In this asexually reproductive phase, the cells are sensitive to temperature and drought stress. They avoid unfavorable light and temperature by swimming in the snow until they reach more optimal conditions. Chloroplasts of green cells are irregularly shaped. The dominating pigment, chlorophyll, gives the cell its characteristic hue and facilitates maximum cell growth through light absorption. Secondary carotenoid concentrations are much lower at this stage as the cells need photosynthetically active radiation for energy and growth. Cells in the green stage also have less organic and inorganic particles on their surface compared to mature cysts.

Later in the season, when nitrogen and nutrients becomes limited and radiation stress increases, the green cells will develop into flagellated sexual gametes that mate and produce new zygotes that have lost their flagella and are capable of surviving the winter period. Transformation into the zygote, or hypnoblast, is characterized by the production and accumulation of reserve materials that include sugars and lipids as well as the formation of esterified secondary carotenoids. The secondary carotenoids will turn the green zygotes orange as they accumulate in the area around the plastids of the cell to protect the zygotes from UV radiation. Orange and red spores can be seen throughout the summer. During this stage, the cell wall will also begin to thicken to help the cell tolerate freezing temperatures and UV light. In addition, the color of these pigments reduces albedo such that individual cells may melt nearby ice and snow crystals to access limiting nutrients and water in an otherwise unavailable frozen state.

== History ==
The earliest documentation of red snow was made by Aristotle. While he recognized that something must be contributing to the odd colouration, red snow was also commonly mistaken as mineral deposits or pollen up until the early 1900s. In 1819, samples of 'red snow' were brought back for examination with a returning Arctic expedition under Sir John Ross. The samples were sent to Robert Brown and Francis Bauer for examination. Both men came to different conclusions on how to classify the specimens. Brown believed the specimen to be a unicellular alga while Bauer declared it a new species of fungus, Uredo nivalis. Over the next century, many researchers disputed over whether these organisms were lichen, plants, alga, or animal. It was not until the early 20th century when researchers finally began to agree on the algal nature of the organism and gave its currently known name, Chlamydomonas nivalis. In 1968 C. nivalis was officially recognized as a collective taxon. Unfortunately, due to the lack of sequencing techniques, reliance on visually examining similarly looking snow alga, and complicated life cycle of this species, errors continued to be made in classifying this and other species of snow algae. Today, C. nivalis has become one of the most well-studied snow algae. Although its taxonomy is still being settled, the life cycle of this snow algae is now much better understood. The historical disputes about the classification and misclassification of specimens have resulted in a number of names from older publications that all mean to refer to C. nivalis. These are: Uredo nivalis, Sphaerella nivalis, Protococcus nivalis, and Haematococcus nivalis.

Furthermore, a new genus of snow algae has been proposed, Sanguina, with the predominant red snow algae found being classified as Sanguina nivaloides. Chlamydomonas nivalis is of close relation to Sanguina nivaloides. While using the name Sanguina nivaloides to be synonymous with Chlamydomonas nivalis is of interest, the two cannot be used interchangeably due to there not being a way to prove the historical species are conspecific.

== Habitat and ecology ==
C. nivalis has been reported worldwide in mountainous regions, polar regions, or snowfields of every continent. It is the most abundant snow algae and typically composes the majority of cells identified in specimens taken from various sample sites. Most habitats these algae reside in are very different from other species of the rest of the genus Chlamydomonas. This includes, but is not limited to snow, rock surfaces, soil, meltwater, and cryoconite holes.

The environmental conditions C. nivalis is typically exposed to are considered to be extreme. The cells can experience low nutrient availability, acidity, intense sunlight, radiation, extreme temperature regimes, and darkness. Red-snow algae have been shown experimentally to be limited by both nutrients (N, P, and K) and liquid water. C. nivalis spends the majority of its life in the cyst stage surrounded by snow at a depth that can range from 0–20 centimetres (0.0–7.9 in). This can change depending on if the cell is in a mobile stage and can move, the snow melts due to the onset of warm weather, or the onset of precipitation causes more snow to fall on the cells. Cells that are exposed on unshaded snow may be subjected to high levels of visible light and ultraviolet radiation for an extended amount of time. Meanwhile, cells that are deep below the snow's surface may experience darkness. In its flagellated stage, the cell can move until it is in the most optimal position in the snow for moisture content, light, and temperature. When in the immotile cyst stage, the C. nivalis cells must depend on the flow of meltwater to move it by chance to a favourable area.

The temperatures in which this species can survive in ranges from below 0 °C to just above 20 °C. Growth is slow when temperatures are below 5 °C. At 5-15 °C the growth of C. nivalis cells can outperform the growth of C. reinhardtii cells. Both species grow at the same rate at 20-25 °C. The growth of C. nivalis is suppressed when temperatures rise above 30 °C. It is a true snow alga because it performs better in low temperatures than warm temperatures. Due to C. nivalis' ability to perform photosynthesis well from cold to moderate temperatures, this species is considered a cryotolerant mesophile rather than a cryophile. This organism is also very resilient as they can also survive in warm soil for weeks. They can also tolerate dryness and room temperature for as long as 6 months.

Fungi, worms, bacteria, and viruses have been found to associate with or live in the same environment as C. nivalis. Encapsulated rod-shaped gram-negative bacteria have been found on the surface of C. nivalis cysts. The unknown bacteria were not detected in control samples that did not contain C. nivalis which strongly suggests that it must be associated with the algae. Another bacterium, Mesorhizobium loti, was found as contamination in a C. nivalis culture, but further testing suggested that this bacteria may be synthesizing vitamin B12 for the algae. In cryoconite holes C. nivalis can be found among bacteria, virus-like particles, ciliates, and Chlorophyte species. Ice worms have also been found to live preferentially under C. nivalis in glaciers, possibly using the algae as a food source. Infections of C. nivalis cells by chytrids, Chytridium chlamydococci, filamentous fungi, and Selenotila nivalis have also been observed.

As winter approaches, the cells will approach the last stage of their life cycle. The orange cells mature into red cysts, the form in which it will remain for the remainder and longest portion of its life cycle. Cells at this stage are most resistant to harsh environmental conditions. Inorganic and organic materials such as bacteria, fungi, and dust particles coat the mucilage layer of the cell wall. The inorganic impurities were found to be rich in silicon, iron, and aluminum. These elements can also be taken up into the cellular compartment and stored in vacuoles and may be an important source of mineral supply. The cell wall, as the boundary that protects the inner contents of the cell from the harsh conditions in its habitat, is very rigid and hard to destroy. It also may play a role in protecting the algal cells from desiccation during the freeze-thaw cycle alternations during seasonal changes. The spherical immotile red cysts range from 35-40 μm in diameter. The cell contains one central chloroplast that has a naked pyrenoid, ribosomes, starch grains, and numerous small grana stacks composed of 3-7 thylakoids within it. Negatively charged phosphatidylglycerol composes the majority of the thylakoid membranes. The thylakoid membrane lipid composition can also be changed to enhance lipid fluidity in response to lower temperatures. An undulated membrane encloses the chloroplast. Lipid bodies and carotenoid globules surround the plastid. A red secondary pigment, astaxanthin and esterified derivatives of it, accumulates up to 20 times the amount of chlorophyll a in the cytoplasmic lipid bodies of mature red spores. Astaxanthin protects the chloroplast from excessive light by absorbing a portion of it before it reaches the photosynthetic apparatus which subsequently prevents photoinhibition and UV damage. The absorbed radiation is converted to heat, aiding in the melt of nearby snow and ice crystals to access needed nutrients and liquid water. Astaxanthin can also act as a metabolic sink for the metabolically active spores that do not divide.

Within the cytoplasm there are several small cytoplasmic vacuoles with partially crystallized content within it. While mitochondria are present, they are not very obvious. Most of the cytoplasmic space is taken up by the large plastid, lipid bodies, and carotenoid globules. C. nivalis has one centrally located nucleus that is also oriented such that it is covered by the carotenoid globules full of astaxanthin that will provide protection against UV radiation. The majority (91%) of astaxanthin derivatives are stored in its monoester form within dormant C. nivalis red cysts. Astaxanthin is the pigment that makes the cell appear deep red. Other pigments that can also be found in C. nivalis include violaxanthin and adonirubin.

== Role in environmental processes and research ==
=== Albedo Reduction ===
Visible algal blooms could be a crucial determinant of surface albedo. It has been suggested that algal blooms partially composed of C. nivalis may contribute to lowering ice and snow albedo. The red coloured pigments produced by the cell in combination with inorganic material could enhance the darkening over the snow and reduce the surface area of white snow. Due to the absorption of solar energy by the alga, albedo would be reduced and the darker areas on the snow where the blooms form would melt more rapidly. As a result, populations of C. nivalis would increase, creating a positive feedback loop that amplifies melting and reduces sunlight absorbance which contributes to glacier retreat and lowering albedo, as shown experimentally. This is concerning to environmentalists and climate scientists.

However, it is also important to consider that positive feedback loops may not be a universal response to algal blooms. Duration of water melt might be a controlling factor for snow algae blooms and in the European Alps, blooms could be considered as staying stable or even being reduced.

C. nivalis can be used as a model species for studying the cellular response mechanism to stressful conditions given the harsh conditions of its habitat. It is also an important organism to study adaptation to extreme environments and may become one of the leading systems for research in cold adaptation. C. nivalis is likely to have strong antioxidant capabilities, a robust repair mechanism, and other components that may be of interest to researchers.

=== Industrial and Biomedical ===
Thermophilic microalgae have gained biotechnological interest as a source for thermostable enzymes and commercial interest as a source for astaxanthin. C. nivalis could also potentially be a source for pharmaceuticals, supplements, or beauty products if the algae could be mass produced for its astaxanthin. The snow algae itself is likely safe to eat as there is no evidence supporting that it would cause diarrhea when ingested.

=== Astrobiology ===
Additionally, psychrophiles have also been of interest in astrobiology (exobiology) to further our understanding of life in the cosmos. With their adaptation to icy environments, these organisms can provide valuable insight into how life might evolve under similar conditions but on other cosmic bodies such as the moons Europa and Enceladus. Snow algae, specifically Chlamydomonas nivalis, has been of interest due to their production of carotenoids and secondary carotenoids (notably astaxanthin) and using them as biomarkers for habitability in the solar system.
