= Senator Harden =

Senator Harden may refer to:

- Alice Harden (1948–2012), Mississippi State Senate
- Clinton Harden (1947–2025), New Mexico State Senate
- Robert Harden (born 1960), Florida State Senate
- Thomas C. Harden (1856–1925), New York State Senate

== See also ==
- Senator Hardin (disambiguation)
