= Charles C. Lockwood =

American politician and judge (1877–1958)

Charles Clapp Lockwood
- Lockwood in 1921

Justice of the New York Supreme Court, 2nd District
- In office 1932–1947

Member of the New York Senate from the 7th district
- In office 1919–1922
- Preceded by: Daniel J. Carroll
- Succeeded by: John A. Hastings

Member of the New York Senate from the 4th district
- In office 1915–1918
- Preceded by: Henry P. Velte
- Succeeded by: Kenneth F. Sutherland

Member of the New York State Assembly from the Kings County, 5th district
- In office 1914–1914
- Preceded by: Vincent A. O'Connor
- Succeeded by: Fred G. Milligan Jr.

Personal details
- Born: September 2, 1877 Brooklyn, New York, U.S.
- Died: September 21, 1958 (aged 81) Brooklyn, New York, U.S.
- Party: Republican
- Spouse(s): Patricia Bleiler Lockwood (m. 1906; died 1957); Hilda Bisset Lockwood
- Children: 1
- Education: New York Law School
- Occupation: Lawyer, politician, judge

Charles Clapp Lockwood (September 2, 1877 – September 21, 1958) was an American lawyer and a Republican Party politician from New York. He was a member of the New York State Senate from 1915 to 1922 (4th District 1915–1918, 7th District 1919–1922) and a justice of the New York Supreme Court 2nd District from 1932 to 1947. He is probably best known for presiding over the Joint Legislative Committee on Housing, also known as the Lockwood Committee (1919–1922), investigating rents and housing in New York City after World War I.

== Early life ==
Lockwood was born on September 2, 1877, in Brooklyn, the son of James K. P. Lockwood (1845–1922) and Katherine Marshall Lockwood. After working in a drugstore in his boyhood and in a lumber yard, he attended evening high school and eventually graduated in 1900 from the New York Law School. Prior to his graduation he worked as an office boy and clerk in the law office of Jasper W. Gilbert, a former justice of the New York Supreme Court. Eventually, he became an associate of the firm and would remain for 14 years.

In 1908 he established his own law firm. He ran a successful and lucrative practice and became financially independent.

== Political career ==
Although Justice Gilbert was a Democrat, well connected to the Tammany Hall political machine, Lockwood turned to the Republican Party and became active in the local Brooklyn Republican clubs. In November 1913, he was elected to the New York State Assembly (Kings County, 5th District) and served in the 1914 session. In November 1914, he was elected to the New York State Senate, where he served from 1915 to 1922, sitting in the 138th through 145th legislatures. He drew support from the Citizens Union, one of the United States' first good government groups.

Lockwood was a prolific legislator. According to The Brooklyn Daily Eagle, as a senator he "sponsored and passed more big legislation than any two members of that body put together during the corresponding period". As chairman of the New York Senate Committee on Public Education, he introduced legislation such as the Teachers' Salary Increase Act, which did much to prevent the breakdown of the school system due to the failure of teachers' pay to follow the soaring cost of living during the war. Because of a nervous breakdown, he was unable to defend the bill in the Senate. The bill advanced nevertheless. He also introduced a bill to sponsor the establishment of kindergartens in public schools. These efforts earned him the support of teachers' unions and the female vote.

== Lockwood Committee ==
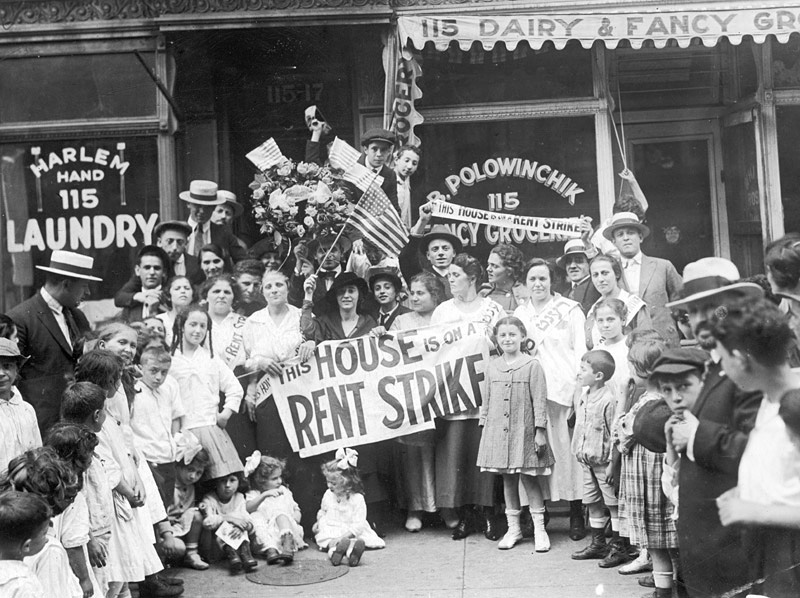
Tenants standing outside a building in Harlem where all tenants went on strike in September 1919.

Lockwood headed the Joint Legislative Committee on Housing, better known as the Lockwood Committee, which was set up in 1919 to investigate renting and building conditions in New York City and end a spate of rent increases resulting from the housing shortage after World War I. From April 1919 to March 1920, amid a series of rent strikes, lengthy hearings and investigations were conducted.

=== Investigations and findings ===
The committee found that housing conditions at the time constituted a serious menace to public health in New York. There was a shortage of around 80,000 low-priced homes. Some 400,000 persons were directly affected by the scarcity of affordable dwellings and the poor quality of the existing ones. The proportion of dwellers per square foot was three to four times that of the pre-war level and considered a "menace to lives, health, morals and safety of the entire community."

The committee uncovered corruption and wrongdoing at every level of the housing industry at a series of hearings and investigations. At the outset, landlords who charged tenants usurious rents were in the committee's spotlight, but subsequently labor unions and building material suppliers were found implicated in a racket that inflated housing costs. Banking and insurance practices in the real estate market were also examined and deemed inadequate. Due to the work of the committee's chief counsel, consumer rights attorney Samuel Untermyer, the investigation exposed that commercial mortgage lenders charged fees and expenses worth between 20 and 50 percent of the initial loan.

=== Legislative response ===
In April 1920, the committee issued a series of recommendations to diminish the rent spiral, resulting in the passage of twelve laws in the Anti-Rent Profiteering Bill. Property owners opposed the bill because it decreased landlords' unlimited control over property and introduced courts into the—up to that time—private landlord–tenant relationship. The new laws required that tenants receive 30 days' notice before eviction and also introduced certain strict conditions for eviction. The committee also made recommendations to stimulate housing construction. New laws granted local authorities the power to use tax incentives to encourage new construction and also allowed municipalities to invest in State Land Bank bonds, in an effort to divert investment capital into much-needed housing construction.

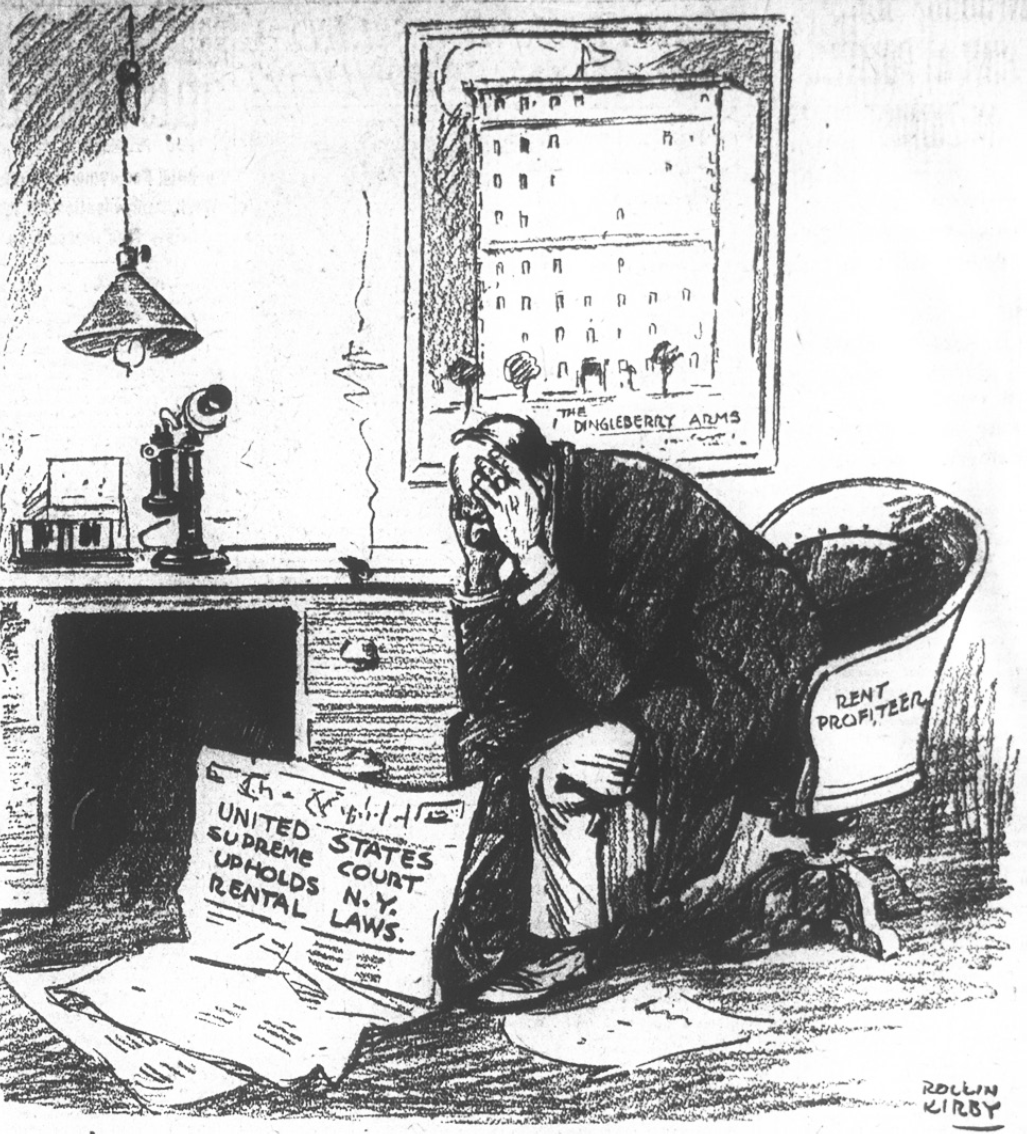
"Out of Luck." United States Supreme Court Upholds N.Y. Rental Laws. New York World, April 20, 1921

The Lockwood Committee's bills were opposed by the New York State Real Estate Board, among others. Officials in the administration of New York Mayor John F. Hylan opposed the Lockwood bills because of the curtailment of absolute property rights. It was feared that builders and investors would abandon investments because they could not get a full return on their investments, increasing the housing shortage.

The enactment of the laws was only the first stage. The real estate sector saw them as unconstitutional and began a legal fight that would be waged all the way through the state courts and up to the United States Supreme Court. In defense of the bills he had sponsored and largely helped to draw, Lockwood was actively involved in the litigation. Despite a series of court cases, the new laws remained in force. The decision of the highest New York State and federal courts to uphold the validity of the laws was a severe blow to those who had capitalized for their profit the housing shortage growing out of the war.

== Later public service ==
Lockwood's tenure as chairman of the Lockwood Committee increased his reputation. However, in the New York City election of 1921, he ran unsuccessfully on the Republican Coalition ticket for New York City Comptroller. After nine years of public life and citing ill health, he did not seek re-election for a new term in the Senate in 1922, and focused on his family and private law practice. In 1923, he was considered for a federal judgeship in Brooklyn, but the business and labor interests that had been under scrutiny of the Lockwood Committee effectively opposed his nomination.

In 1926, he was appointed by Democratic Governor Alfred E. Smith to the New York Transit Commission. Lockwood tried to unify the subway system under municipal authority and was a strong proponent of the five-cent fare, a contentious issue which in New York City had become a fundamental right that no politician could oppose without severe political consequences. In the 1928 New York state election, he ran on the Republican ticket for Lieutenant Governor of New York with Albert Ottinger for governor, but was defeated by Democrat Herbert H. Lehman, who ran with Franklin D. Roosevelt.

== New York Supreme Court justice ==
In 1931, Lockwood was elected a justice of the New York Supreme Court (2nd District). He was re-elected in 1945 and retired on December 31, 1947, at the end of the year in which he reached the mandatory retirement age. After his retirement he continued to act as an official referee for the court, handling complicated land acquisition cases in which the City of New York was defrauded of millions of dollars each year by corrupt officials and crooked lawyers. He resigned in January 1954.

In his final years, Governor Thomas E. Dewey appointed Lockwood along with New York City's construction coordinator Robert Moses and former Secretary of War Robert P. Patterson as a member of the Temporary Long Island Railroad Commission, installed after the Richmond Hill train crash on November 22, 1950, which claimed 79 lives. The commission recommended the state purchase and operation of the railway service by a non-profit public authority.

In 1954, he served as chairman of the Special Legislative Committee on Integrity and Ethical Standards in Government after it was discovered that influential politicians acquired substantial blocks of stock in harness racing tracks and racing associations. The committee proposed the first generally applicable state ethics law in New York.

Lockwood was associated with the Guggenheimer & Untermyer law firm and was president of the Board of Trustees of the Brooklyn Law School.

== Death and legacy ==
Lockwood died of a heart attack on September 21, 1958, in Brooklyn, New York City, at the age of 81. He was survived by his second wife, Hilda Bisset Lockwood, and a son, John Marshall Lockwood. His first wife, Patricia Bleiler Lockwood, whom he had married in 1906, died in 1957.

== Sources ==
- Fine, Sidney (1995). Without Blare of Trumpets: Walter Drew, the National Erectors' Association, and the Open Shop Movement, 1903-57, University of Michigan Press, ISBN 0-472-10576-0
- Fogelson, Robert M. (2013). The Great Rent Wars: New York, 1917-1929, Yale University Press, ISBN 978-0-300-19172-1
- Roess, Roger P. & Gene Sansone (2013). The Wheels That Drove New York: A History of the New York City Transit System, Springer, ISBN 978-3-642-30483-5

New York State Assembly
Preceded by Vincent A. O'Connor	New York State Assembly; Kings County, 5th District; 1914	Succeeded by Fred G. Milligan Jr.
New York State Senate
Preceded by Henry P. Velte	New York State Senate; 4th District; 1915–1918	Succeeded by Kenneth F. Sutherland
Preceded by Daniel J. Carroll	New York State Senate; 7th District; 1919–1922	Succeeded by John A. Hastings
Party political offices
Preceded by Seymour Lowman	Republican nominee for Lieutenant Governor of New York; 1928	Succeeded by Caleb H. Baumes
