= History of the New York City Subway (to 1940) =

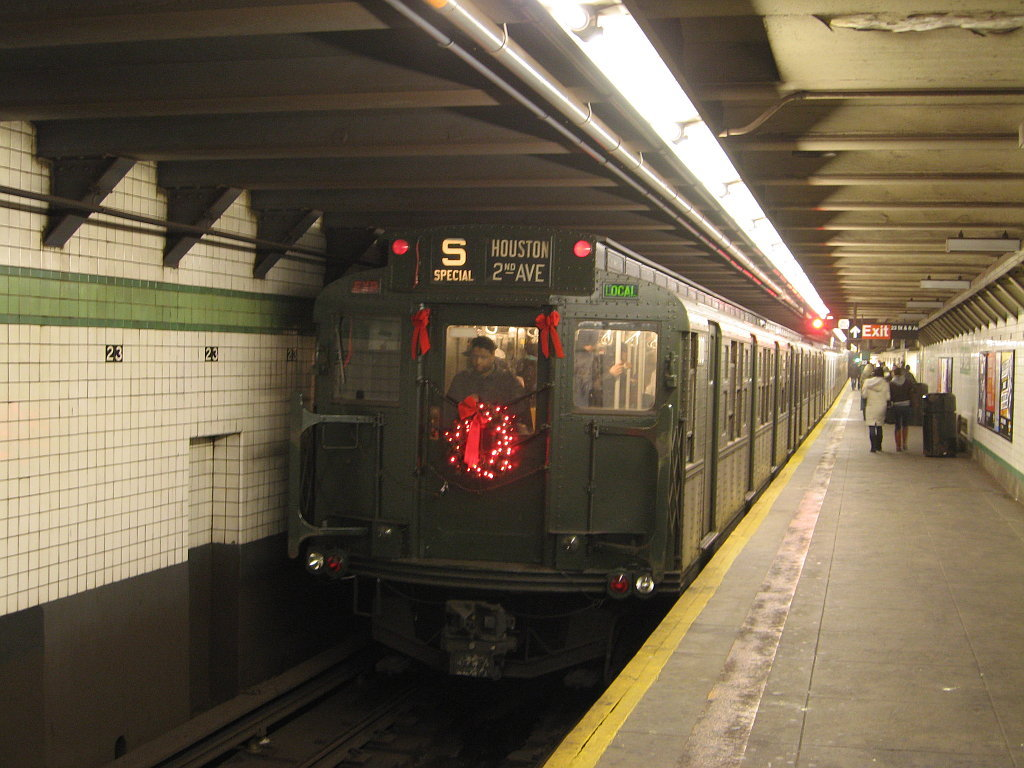
New York City Subway R1 car at the 23rd Street station, on a holiday train special in December 2007

Annual passenger ridership
Year	Passengers	%±
1901	253,000,000	—
1905	448,000,000	+77.1%
1910	725,000,000	+61.8%
1915	830,000,000	+14.5%
1920	1,332,000,000	+60.5%
1925	1,681,000,000	+26.2%
1930	2,049,000,000	+21.9%
1935	1,817,000,000	−11.3%
1940	1,857,000,000	+2.2%
1945	1,941,000,000	+4.5%
1946	2,067,000,000	+6.5%
1950	1,681,000,000	−13.4%
1955	1,378,000,000	−18.0%
1960	1,345,000,000	−2.4%
1965	1,363,000,000	+1.3%
1970	1,258,000,000	−7.7%
1975	1,054,000,000	−16.2%
1980	1,009,000,000	−4.3%
1982	989,000,000	−2.0%
1985	1,010,000,000	+2.1%
1990	1,028,000,000	+1.8%
1995	1,093,000,000	+6.3%
2000	1,400,000,000	+28.1%
2005	1,450,000,000	+3.6%
2010	1,605,000,000	+10.7%
2011	1,640,000,000	+2.2%
2012	1,654,000,000	+0.1%
2013	1,708,000,000	+3.3%
2014	1,751,287,621	+2.6%
2015	1,762,565,419	+0.6%
2016	1,756,814,800	-0.3%
2017	1,727,366,607	-1.7%
2018	1,680,060,402	-2.7%
2019	1,697,787,002	+1.1%
2020	639,541,029	-62.3%
2021	759,976,721	+18.8%
2022	1,013,425,465	+33.3%
2023	1,151,998,158	+13.7%
2024	1,194,866,357	+3.7%
2025	1,281,883,361	+7.6%

The New York City Subway was built almost entirely before 1940, when the Brooklyn–Manhattan Transit Corporation (BMT) and the Interborough Rapid Transit Company (IRT), private companies which had built and operated much of the subway, were acquired by the city and merged with the city-owned Independent Subway System (IND). Those first decades of the subway's operation saw significant growth in New York City's population, from 3.4 million people in 1900 (four years before the opening of the first subway line) to 7.5 million in 1940.

By the late 1870s the Manhattan Railway Company was an elevated railway company in Manhattan and the Bronx, New York City, United States. It operated four lines: the Second Avenue Line, Third Avenue Line, Sixth Avenue Line, and Ninth Avenue Line. The first underground line opened on October 27, 1904, almost 35 years after the opening of the first elevated line in New York City, which became the IRT Ninth Avenue Line. By the time the first subway opened, the lines had been consolidated into two privately owned systems, the Brooklyn Rapid Transit Company (BRT, later BMT) and the IRT. After 1913, all lines built for the IRT and most lines for the BRT were built by the city and leased to the companies. The first line of the city-owned and operated Independent Subway System (IND) opened in 1932, intended to compete with the private systems and replace some of the elevated railways. It was required to be run "at cost", necessitating fares up to double the five-cent fare popular at the time.

The city took over running the previously privately operated systems in 1940, with the BMT on June 1 and the IRT on June 12.

== Precursors ==
=== Steam railways ===
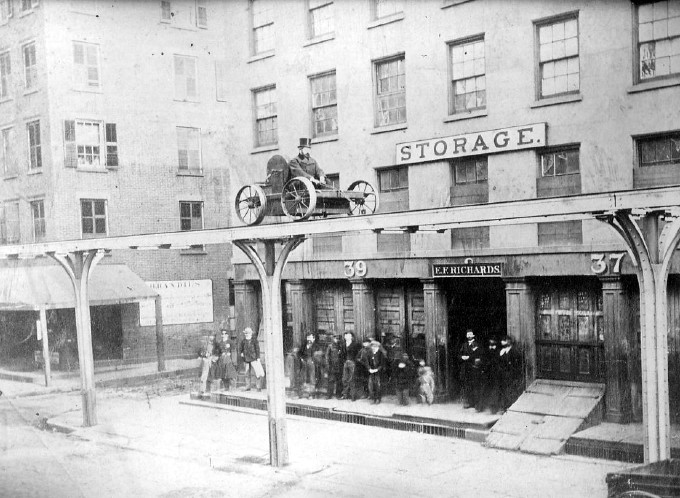
Charles Harvey demonstrating his elevated railroad design on Greenwich Street in 1867

Even though there was an earlier, underground railroad called the Atlantic Avenue Tunnel since 1844, it had no underground subway stops. Construction of this tunnel, which was built mainly to create a grade-separated right of way for the Brooklyn and Jamaica Railroad (now the Long Island Rail Road's Atlantic Branch), began in May 1844, and the tunnel was open by December 1844. This led to South Ferry at the foot of Atlantic Avenue, where passengers could catch ferries to Manhattan. This extension, running under Cobble Hill, was closed by 1861. The tunnel was reopened for tourism in 1982, and closed again in 2010.

The beginnings of the actual Subway came from various excursion railroads to Coney Island and elevated railroads in Manhattan and Brooklyn. At that time, New York County (Manhattan Island and part of the Bronx), Kings County (including the cities of Brooklyn and Williamsburg), and Queens County were separate municipal entities. Competing steam-powered elevated railroads were built over major avenues. The first elevated line was constructed from 1867 to 1870 by Charles Harvey and his West Side and Yonkers Patent Railway company along Greenwich Street and Ninth Avenue (although cable cars were the initial mode of transportation on that railway). More lines were built on Second, Third and Sixth Avenues. None of these structures remain today, but these lines later shared trackage with subway trains as part of the IRT system.

In Kings County, elevated railroads were built by several companies over Lexington, Myrtle, Third and Fifth Avenues, Fulton Street and Broadway. These also later shared trackage with subway trains operated by the BRT and BMT. Most of these structures have been dismantled, but some have been rebuilt and upgraded. These lines were linked to Manhattan by various ferries and later the tracks along the Brooklyn Bridge (which originally had their own line and were later integrated into the BRT/BMT). Also in Kings County, six steam excursion railroads were built to various beaches in the southern part of the county; all but one (the Manhattan Beach Line) eventually fell under BMT control.

=== Beach Pneumatic Transit ===
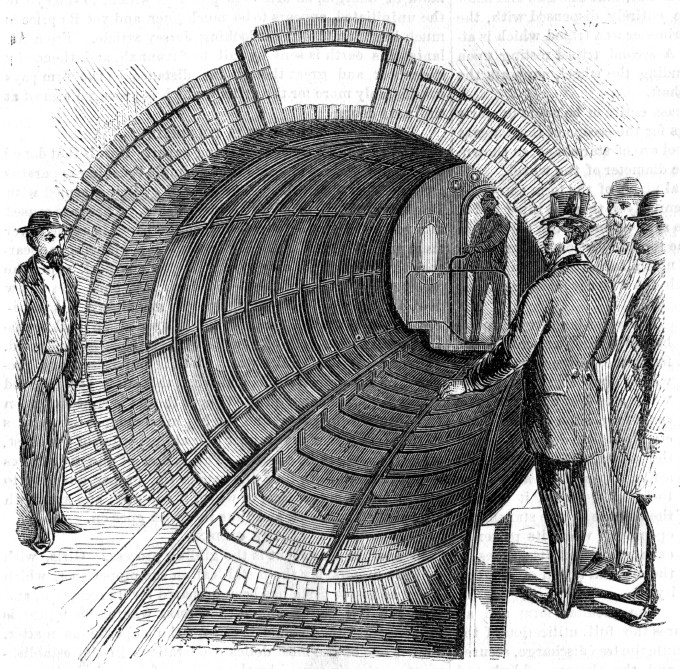
Beach Pneumatic Transit

The Beach Pneumatic Transit was the first attempt to build an underground public transit system in New York City. In 1869, Alfred Ely Beach and his Beach Pneumatic Transit Company of New York began constructing a pneumatic subway line beneath Broadway. Funneled through a company he set up, Beach put up $350,000 of his own money to bankroll the project. Built in only 58 days, its single tunnel, 312 feet (95 m) long, 8 feet (2.4 m) in diameter, was completed in 1870 and ran under Broadway from Warren Street to Murray Street.

It remained little more than a curiosity, running only a single car on its one-block-long track to a dead-end at its terminus. Passengers would simply ride out and back, to see what the proposed subway might be like. During its first two weeks of operation, the Beach Pneumatic Transit sold over 11,000 rides, with 400,000 rides provided during its first year of operation. Although the public showed initial approval, Beach was delayed in getting permission to expand it. By the time he finally gained permission in 1873, public and financial support had waned, and the subway was closed down.

The final blow to the project was a stock market crash in 1873 which caused investors to withdraw support. After the project was shut down, the tunnel entrance was sealed, and the station, built in part of the basement of the Rogers Peet Building, was reclaimed for other uses. The entire building was lost to fire in 1898. In 1912, workers excavating for the present-day BMT Broadway Line dug into the old Beach tunnel; today, no part of this line remains as the tunnel was completely within the limits of the present day City Hall Station under Broadway.

== Beginnings and rapid expansion ==
=== The first subways ===
==== IRT ====
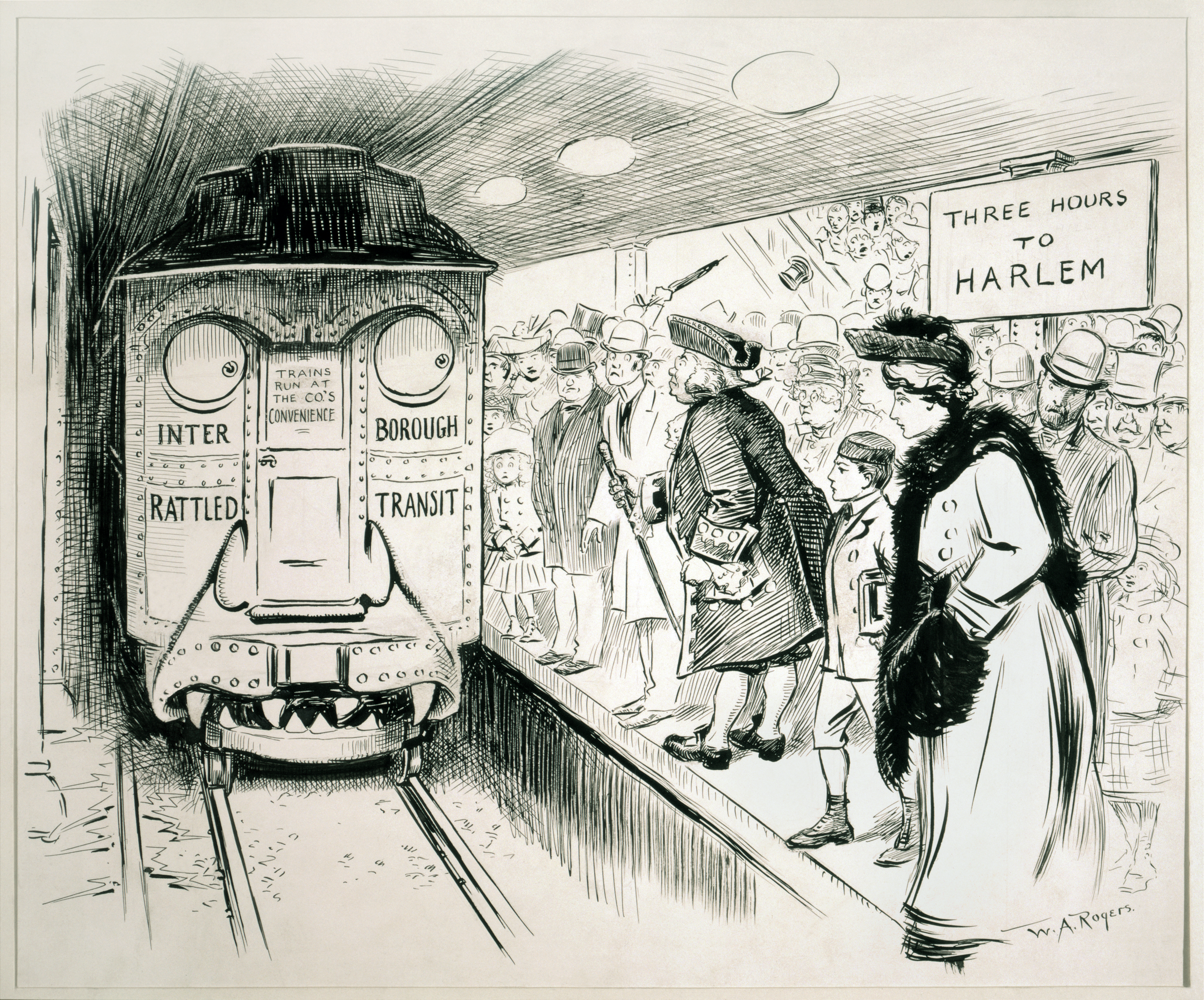
Political cartoon critical of IRT service in 1905. The IRT is labeled as the "Interborough Rattled Transit".

In 1898, New York, Kings and Richmond Counties, and parts of Queens and Westchester Counties and their constituent cities, towns, villages, and hamlets, were consolidated into the City of Greater New York. During this era the expanded City of New York resolved that it wanted the core of future rapid transit to be underground subways but realized that no private company was willing to put up the enormous capital required to build beneath the streets.

Planning for the system began with the Rapid Transit Act, authorized by the New York State Legislature on May 22, 1894, which created the Board of Rapid Transit Railroad Commissioners. The act provided that the commission would lay out routes with the consent of property owners and local authorities, either build the system or sell a franchise for its construction, and lease the operation to a private firm. A line through Lafayette Street (then Elm Street) to Union Square was considered, but at first a more costly route under lower Broadway was adopted. A legal battle with property owners along the route led to the courts denying permission to build through Broadway in 1896.

The Elm Street route was chosen later that year, cutting west to Broadway via 42nd Street. This new plan, formally adopted on January 14, 1897, consisted of a line from City Hall north to Kingsbridge and a branch under Lenox Avenue and to Bronx Park, to have four tracks from City Hall to the junction at 103rd Street. The "awkward alignment...along Forty-Second Street", as the commission put it, was necessitated by objections to using Broadway south of 34th Street. Legal challenges were resolved in 1899.

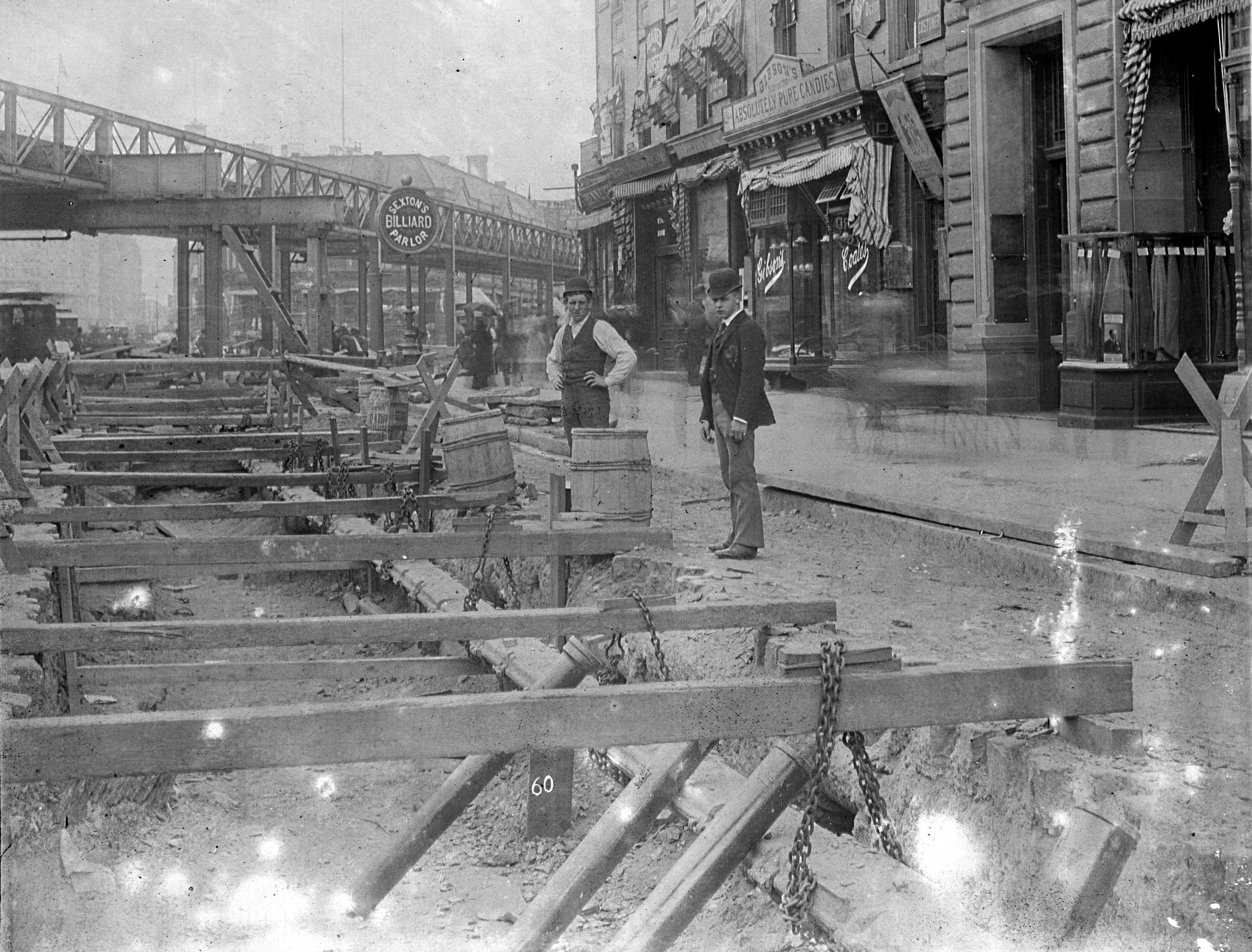
Subway construction in the Bowery, 1901

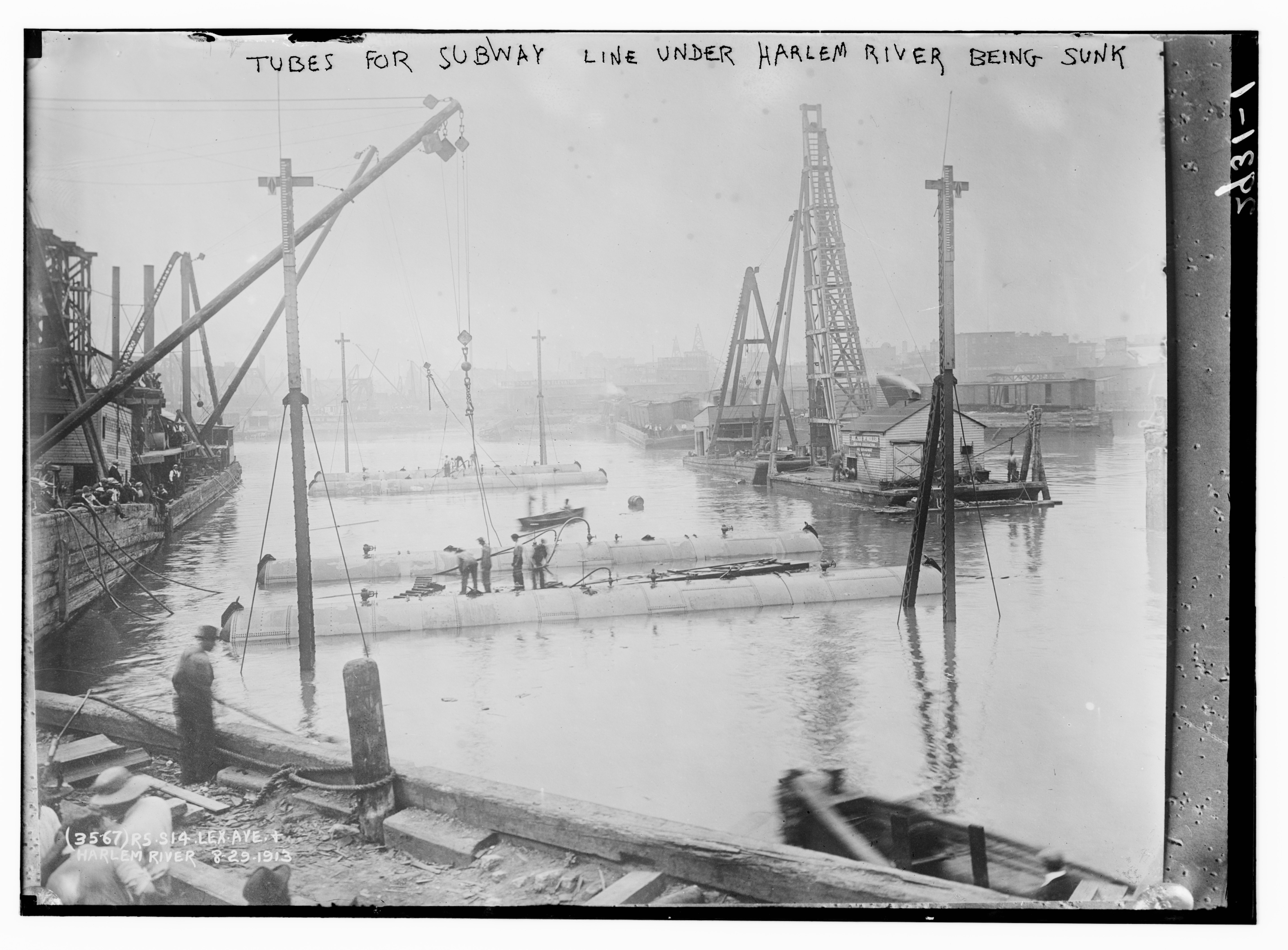
Tubes for subway line under Harlem River, being sunk, 1904

The city decided to issue rapid transit bonds outside of its regular bonded debt limit and build the subways itself; it contracted with the Interborough Rapid Transit Company (which by that time ran the elevated lines in Manhattan) to equip and operate the subways, sharing the profits with the city and guaranteeing a fixed five-cent fare.

==== BRT ====
Starting in 1899, the Brooklyn Rapid Transit Company (BRT; 1896–1923) and Brooklyn–Manhattan Transit Corporation (BMT; 1923–1940) operated rapid transit lines in New York City — at first only elevated railways and later also subways.

The BRT was incorporated on January 18, 1896. It took over the bankrupt Long Island Traction Company in early February, acquiring the Brooklyn Heights Railroad and the lessee of the Brooklyn City Rail Road. It then acquired the Brooklyn, Queens County and Suburban Railroad. The BRT took over the property of a number of surface railroads, the earliest of which, the Brooklyn, Bath and Coney Island Railroad or West End Line, opened for passenger service on October 9, 1863, between Fifth Avenue at 36th Street at the border of Brooklyn City and Bath Beach in the Town of Gravesend, New York. A short piece of surface route of this railroad, the BMT West End Line (today's D, R, and W trains) on the west side of the Coney Island Complex north of the Coney Island Creek, is the oldest existing piece of rapid transit right-of-way in New York City and in the U.S., having opened on June 8, 1864.

On January 30, 1899, the Brooklyn Union Elevated Railroad was incorporated; it acquired the property of the bankrupt Brooklyn Elevated Railroad on February 17. The BRT gained control a month later, on March 25, and leased the elevated company to the Brooklyn Heights Railroad, which was until then solely a street railway company. The other elevated company in Brooklyn, the Kings County Elevated Railway, was sold under foreclosure to the BRT on July 6, 1899. Initially the surface and elevated railroad lines ran on steam power, but between 1893 and 1900 the lines were converted to run on electricity. An exception was the service on the Brooklyn Bridge. Trains were operated by cables from 1883 to 1896, when they were converted to electric power.

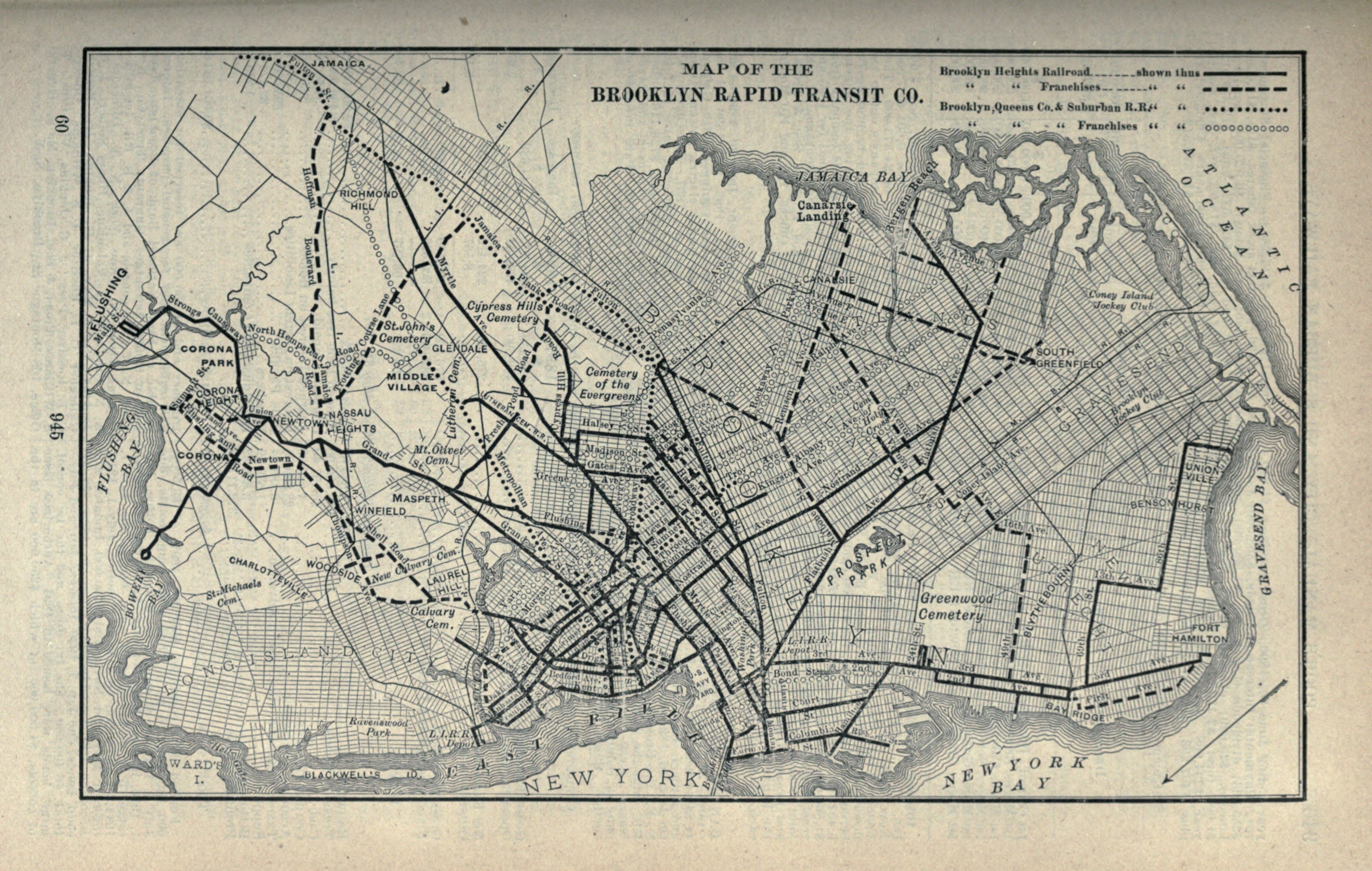
Routes in 1897

By 1900, The BRT had acquired virtually all of the rapid transit and streetcar operations in its target area. Only the Coney Island and Brooklyn Railroad and the short Van Brunt Street and Erie Basin Railroad remained independent; the former was acquired in 1913 or 1914. The incorporated lines were:

- Sea Beach Railway, acquired in November 1897 and leased to the BHRR
- Sea View Railroad (Coney Island Elevated), acquired in November 1897 and leased to the BHRR
- Nassau Electric Railroad (lessee of the Atlantic Avenue Railroad, Brooklyn, Bath and West End Railroad, Coney Island and Gravesend Railway, and South Brooklyn Railway), acquired in November 1898 and leased to the BHRR in April 1899
- Brooklyn Elevated Railroad, acquired in March 1899 and leased to the BHRR in April 1899
- Brooklyn and Brighton Beach Railroad (Brighton Beach Line), acquired in March 1899
- Kings County Elevated Railroad (Fulton Street Line), acquired in November 1899 and merged into the Brooklyn Union Elevated on May 24, 1900
- Prospect Park and Coney Island Railroad (Culver Line), leased to the BHRR on June 18, 1899

The BRT became bankrupt by 1918. The New York Consolidated Railroad and New York Municipal Railway were merged in June 1923, the same month that the BRT was reorganized as the Brooklyn–Manhattan Transit Corporation, to form the New York Rapid Transit Corporation.

=== Contracts ===
==== Original IRT contracts ====
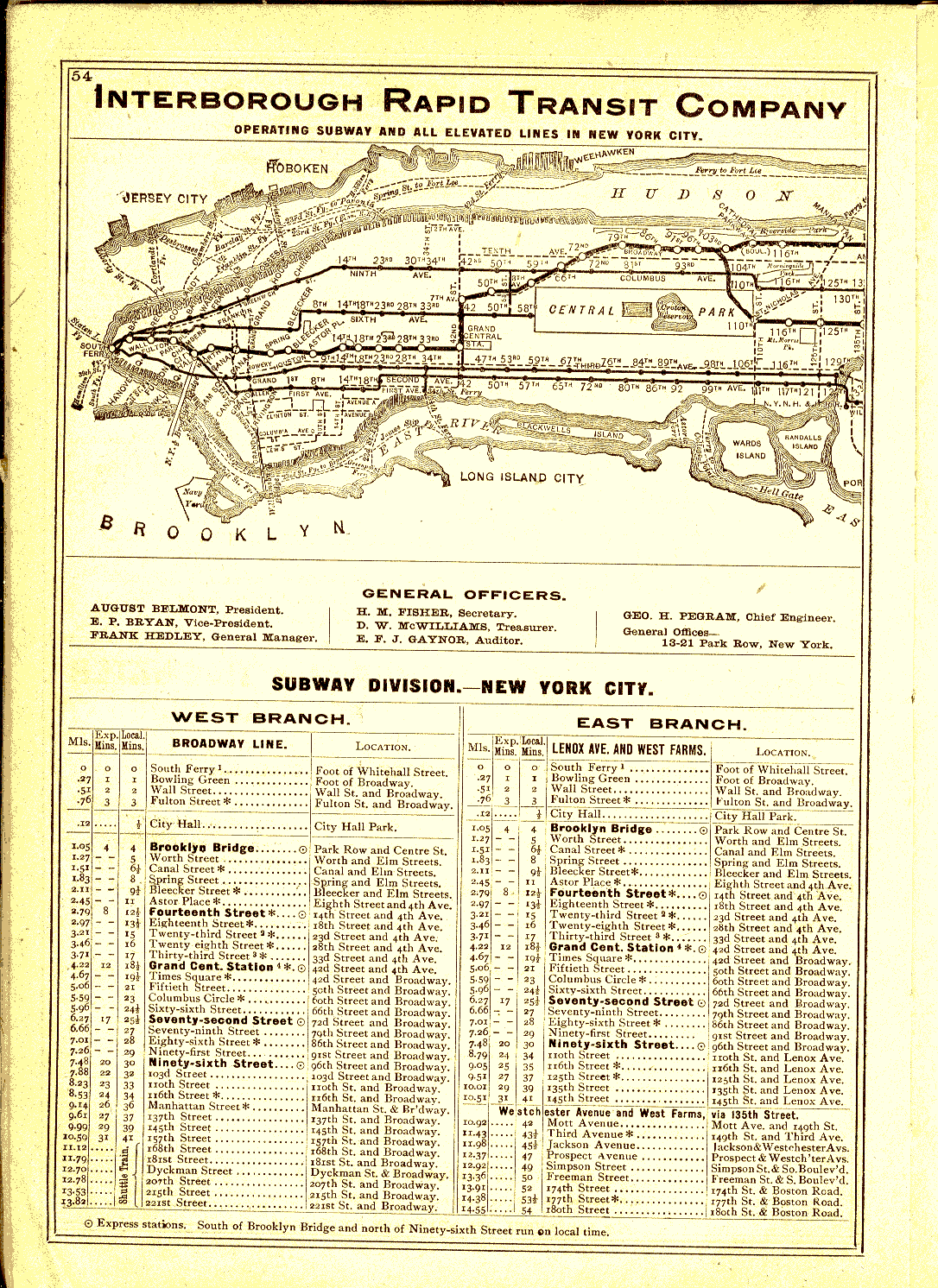
1906 IRT map

A contract, later known as Contract 1, was executed on February 21, 1900, between the commission and the Rapid Transit Construction Company, organized by John B. McDonald and funded by August Belmont, for the construction of the subway and a 50-year operating lease from the opening of the line. The project was divided into fifteen sections on which subcontractors submitted construction bids.

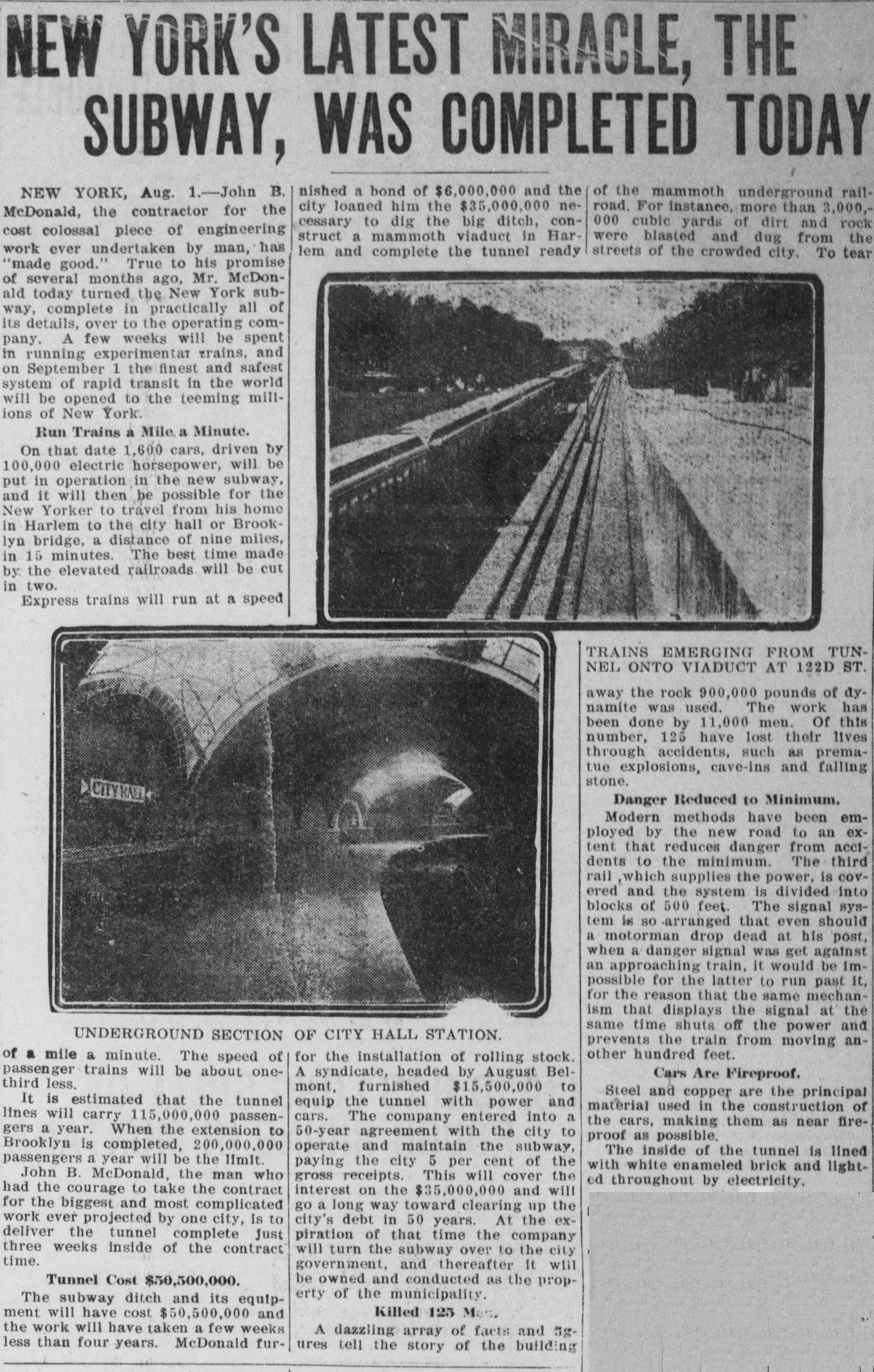
August 1904 announcement that construction on the subway was complete

Ground was broken in a ceremony at City Hall on March 24, celebrated at the time as "Tunnel Day". A plan for an extension from City Hall to the Long Island Rail Road's Flatbush Avenue terminal station (now known as Atlantic Terminal) in Brooklyn was adopted on January 24, 1901, and Contract 2, giving a lease of 35 years, was executed between the commission and the Rapid Transit Construction Company on September 11, with construction beginning at State Street in Manhattan on November 8, 1902. Belmont incorporated the IRT in April 1902 as the operating company for both contracts; the IRT leased the Manhattan Railway Company, operator of the four elevated railway lines in Manhattan and the Bronx, on April 1, 1903. Operation of the subway began on October 27, 1904, with the opening of all stations from City Hall to 145th Street on the West Side Branch.

Service was extended to 157th Street on November 12, 1904. The West Side Branch was extended northward to a temporary terminus of 221st Street and Broadway on March 12, 1906. This extension was served by shuttle trains operating between 157th Street and 221st Street. The original system as included in Contract 1 was completed on January 14, 1907, when trains started running across the Harlem Ship Canal on the Broadway Bridge to 225th Street, meaning that 221st Street could be closed. Once the line was extended to 225th Street, the structure of the 221st Street was dismantled and was moved to 230th Street for a new temporary terminus. Service was extended to the temporary terminus at 230th Street on January 27, 1907. An extension of Contract 1 north to 242nd Street at Van Cortlandt Park was approved in 1906 and opened on August 1, 1908.

The original plan had been to turn east on 230th Street to just west of Bailey Avenue, at the New York Central Railroad's Kings Bridge station. When the line was extended to 242nd Street, the temporary platforms at 230th Street were dismantled, and were rumored to be brought to 242 Street to serve as the station's side platforms. There were two stations on the line that opened later; 191st Street and 207th Street. 191st Street was not open until January 14, 1911, because the elevators and other work had not yet been completed. 207th Street was completed in 1906, but since it was located in a sparsely occupied area, the station was opened in 1907.

The initial segment of the IRT White Plains Road Line opened on November 26, 1904, between East 180th Street and Jackson Avenue. Initially, trains on the line were served by elevated trains from the IRT Second Avenue Line and the IRT Third Avenue Line, with a connection running from the Third Avenue local tracks at Third Avenue and 149th Street to Westchester Avenue and Eagle Avenue. Once the connection to the IRT Lenox Avenue Line opened on July 10, 1905, trains from the newly opened IRT subway ran via the line. Elevated service via this connection was resumed on October 1, 1907, when Second Avenue locals were extended to Freeman Street during rush hours.

The line was then extended to Fulton Street on January 16, 1905, to Wall Street on June 12, 1905, and to Bowling Green and South Ferry on July 10, 1905. In order to complete Contract 2, the subway had to be extended under the East River to reach Brooklyn. The tunnel was named the Joralemon Street Tunnel, which was the first underwater subway tunnel connecting Manhattan and Brooklyn, and it opened on January 9, 1908, extending the subway from Bowling Green to Borough Hall. On May 1, 1908, the construction of Contract 2 was completed when the line was extended from Borough Hall to Atlantic Avenue near the Flatbush Avenue LIRR station. When the IRT extension to Brooklyn opened, riders on the BRT's elevated and trolley lines over the Brooklyn Bridge began using the new subway.

==== Electrification ====
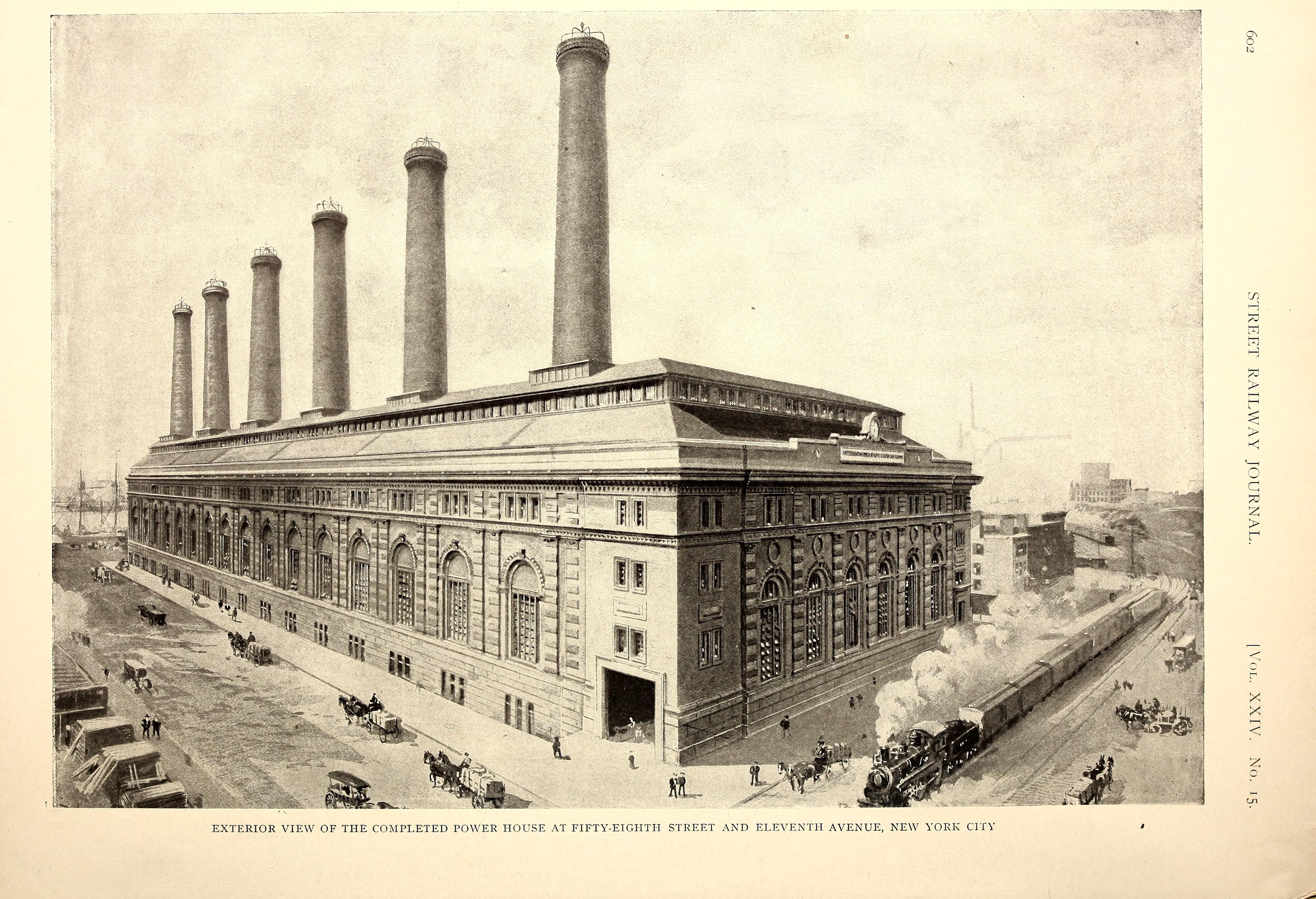
The IRT main powerhouse in 1904

The subway system began during the war of the currents when Thomas Edison and his opponent, George Westinghouse, struggled over acceptance of direct current or alternating current as the standard way to deliver electricity. Alternating current became the standard for non-railroad purposes, but New York City Subway adopted direct current as more suitable for urban railroad purposes. The companies built their own power stations to generate their DC. To this day, the New York City Transit Authority converts alternating current to 600 V DC third rail to power the trains, as do most transit railways around the world. (The A Division uses 625 V DC third rail.)

==== Triborough plan ====
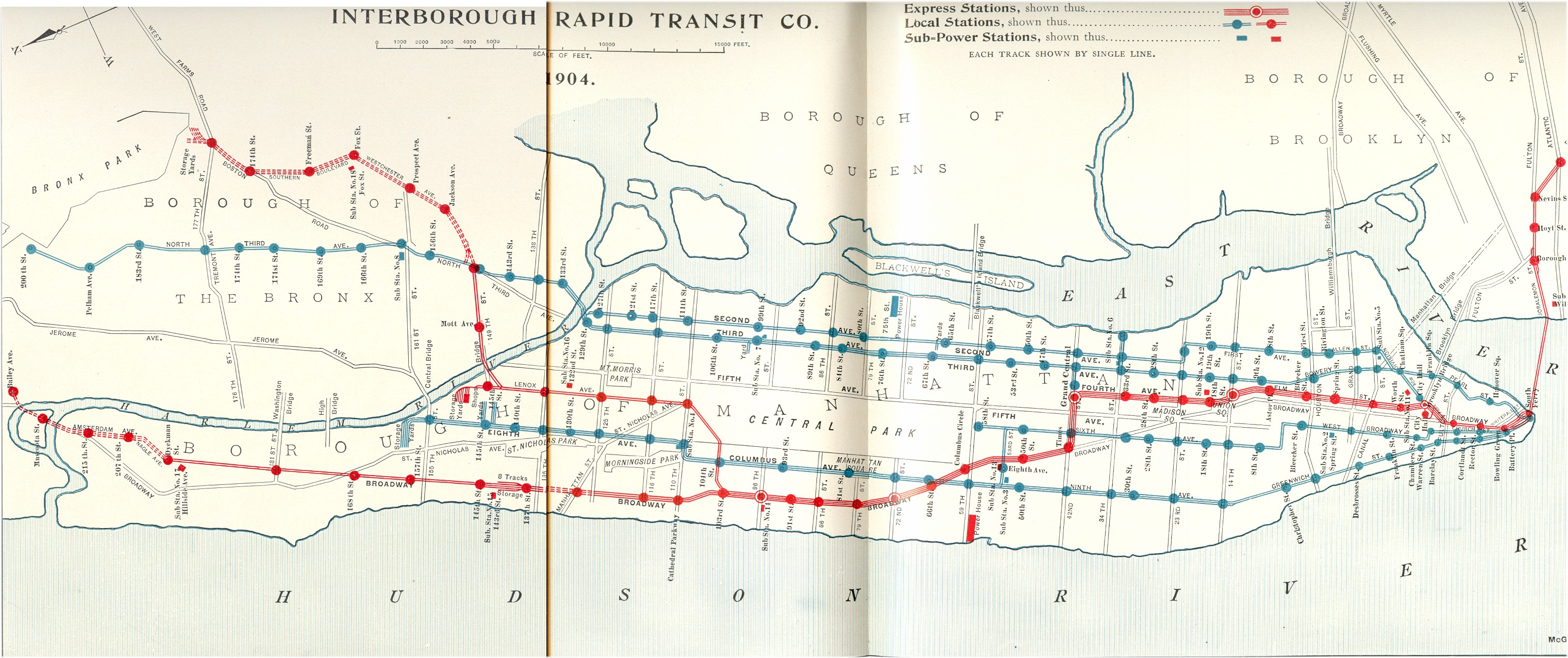
A 1918 IRT map, after Contracts 1 and 2 were signed

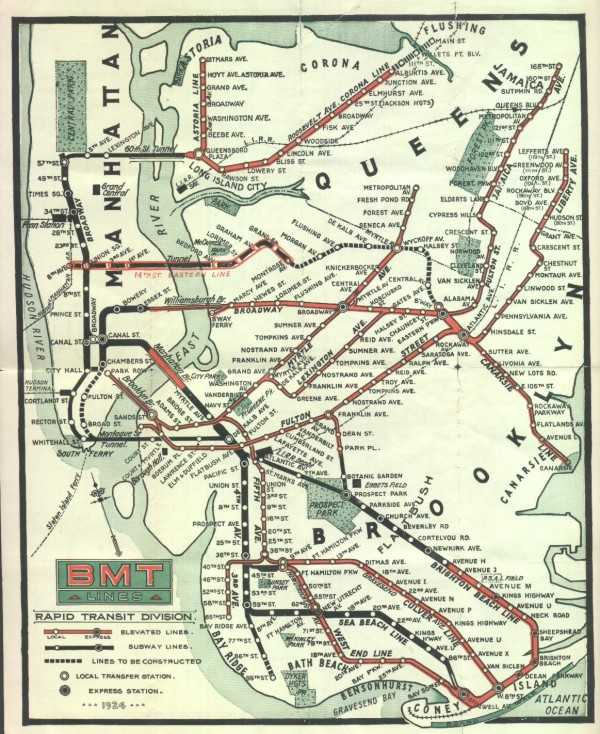
A 1924 BMT map

After the statutory debt ceiling for the now-united city of New York had been raised, there were more plans for subway construction until 1908. The Triborough plan comprised three new lines:

- An IRT line from South Ferry–Whitehall Street in Manhattan, with the IRT Lexington Avenue Line to Pelham Bay Park and Woodlawn in the Bronx
- The BRT Nassau Street Loop, later the BMT Nassau Street Line. The BRT's track went over the Brooklyn, Manhattan, and Williamsburg Bridges; the Nassau Street Line was to connect to the Brooklyn Bridge, but never did. The connections to the other two bridges were built, but with the 1967 opening of the Chrystie Street Connection, the Manhattan Bridge connection was eliminated.
- A BRT subway under Fourth Avenue in Brooklyn, leading to Bay Ridge and Coney Island. This corresponded to today's Fourth Avenue and Sea Beach lines.

The BRT lines were built to wider profiles because the BRT did not want to use IRT trackage, which was narrower by comparison and carried far fewer passengers per hour. The design was inspired by the cars built for the Cambridge subway (MBTA Red Line) which were designed after studies were conducted on the design and operation of a subway car that could carry the most passengers the most efficiently. The rolling stock, however, had to be the same track gauge so the trains could interoperate under the Dual Contracts. The Fourth Avenue and Sea Beach lines were opened on June 19, 1915, after years of delays for building of these lines and the Nassau Street Line. The first BRT section, however, had opened on September 16, 1908, from Essex Street across the Williamsburg Bridge, but using narrow-width cars.

Until the completion of the Fourth Avenue Line, there was a tram across the Manhattan Bridge which did not connect to any tracks in the New York City Subway. The track was called "Manhattan Bridge Three Cent Line" because the fare was three cents. Along with the Brooklyn and North River Railroad, the two streetcar companies began operations on those tracks. When trackage was connected to the bridge in 1915, the trolleys were moved to the upper level roadways until 1929, when service was discontinued.

==== Dual Contracts ====
The BRT, which just barely entered Manhattan via the Brooklyn Bridge, wanted the opportunity to compete with the IRT, and the IRT wanted to extend its Brooklyn line to compete with the BRT. This led to the city's agreement to contract for future subways with both the BRT and IRT.

The expansion of rapid transit was greatly facilitated by the signing of the Dual Contracts on March 19, 1913. Contract 3 was signed between the IRT and the city; the contract between the BRT and the city was Contract 4. The majority of the present-day subway system was either built or improved under these contracts. The Astoria Line and Flushing Line were built at this time and were for some time operated by both companies. Under the terms of Contracts 3 and 4, the city would build new subway and elevated lines, rehabilitate and expand certain existing elevated lines, and lease them to the private companies for operation. The cost would be borne more-or-less equally by the city and the companies. The city's contribution was in cash raised by bond offerings, while the companies' contributions were variously by supplying cash, facilities, and equipment to run the lines.

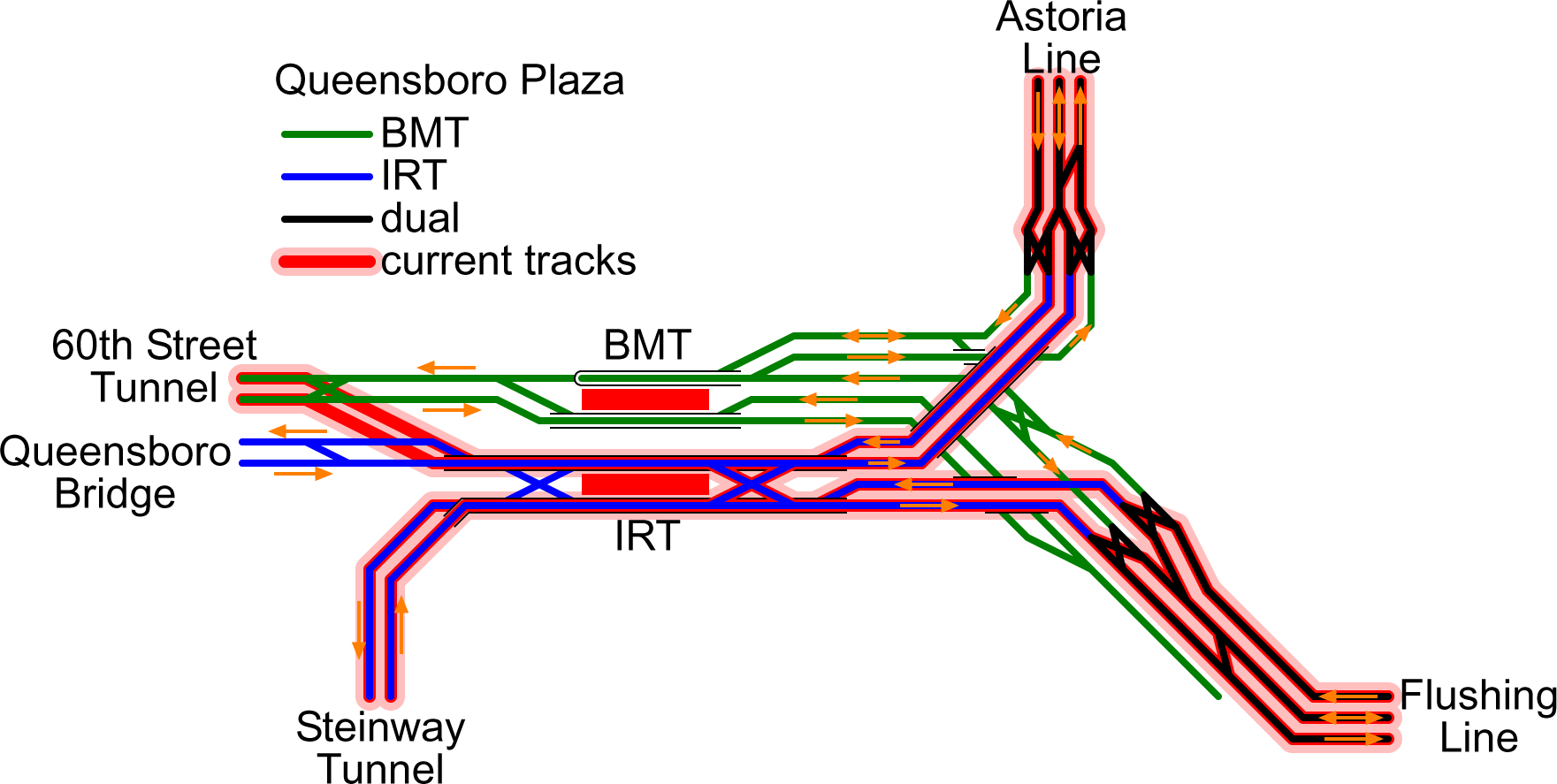
The track layout of Queensboro Plaza was complex because the Contracts necessitated two different types of rolling stock and two different fare control areas.

As part of the contracts, the two companies were to share lines in Queens: a short line to Astoria called the Astoria Line; and a longer line reaching initially to Corona, and eventually to Flushing, called the Corona Line. The lines operated jointly and began from Queensboro Plaza. The IRT accessed the station both from the 1907 Steinway Tunnel and an extension of the Second Avenue Elevated from Manhattan over the Queensboro Bridge. The BRT fed the Queens lines from a new tunnel from the 60th Street Tunnel to Manhattan. Technically the line was under IRT ownership, but the BRT/BMT was granted trackage rights in perpetuity, essentially making it theirs also.

Both lines were built to IRT specifications. This meant that IRT passengers had a one-seat ride to Manhattan destinations, whereas BRT passengers had to make a change at Queensborough Plaza. This came to be important when service was extended for the 1939 World's Fair, as the IRT was able to offer direct express trains from Manhattan, and the BRT was not. This practice lasted well into the municipal ownership of the lines and was not ended until 1949.

Several provisions were imposed on the companies: the fare was limited to five cents, and this led to financial troubles for the two companies after post-World War I inflation; the city had the right to "recapture" any of the lines it built and run them as its own; and the city was to share in the profits. This eventually led to their downfall and consolidation into city ownership in 1940.

As part of the Dual Contracts, the operations of the original IRT system changed drastically. Instead of having trains go via Broadway, turn onto 42nd Street, and finally turn onto Park Avenue, there were two trunk lines connected by the 42nd Street Shuttle. The system was changed from a "Z" system to an "H" system. The first trunk line, the Lexington Avenue Line assumed the portion of the original IRT system south of Grand Central. The line was extended northward with a new station at Grand Central and turned onto Lexington Avenue, where the line remained as four tracks. The line had connections to the new IRT Pelham Line and IRT Jerome Avenue Line in the Bronx, in addition to a new connection to the IRT White Plains Road Line.

The second trunk, the Broadway–Seventh Avenue Line assumed the portion of the original IRT system north of Times Square, and it extended southward with a new station at Times Square, running down Seventh Avenue, Varick Street and West Broadway. It was predicted that the subway extension would lead to the growth of the Lower West Side, and to neighborhoods such as Chelsea and Greenwich Village. South of Chambers Street, two branches were constructed. The first branch ran to the Battery via Greenwich Street, while the second branch turned eastward under Park Place and Beeckman Street and down William Street, running under the East River through a tunnel before running under Clark Street and Fulton Street until it reached a junction at Borough Hall with the existing Contract 2 IRT Brooklyn Line.

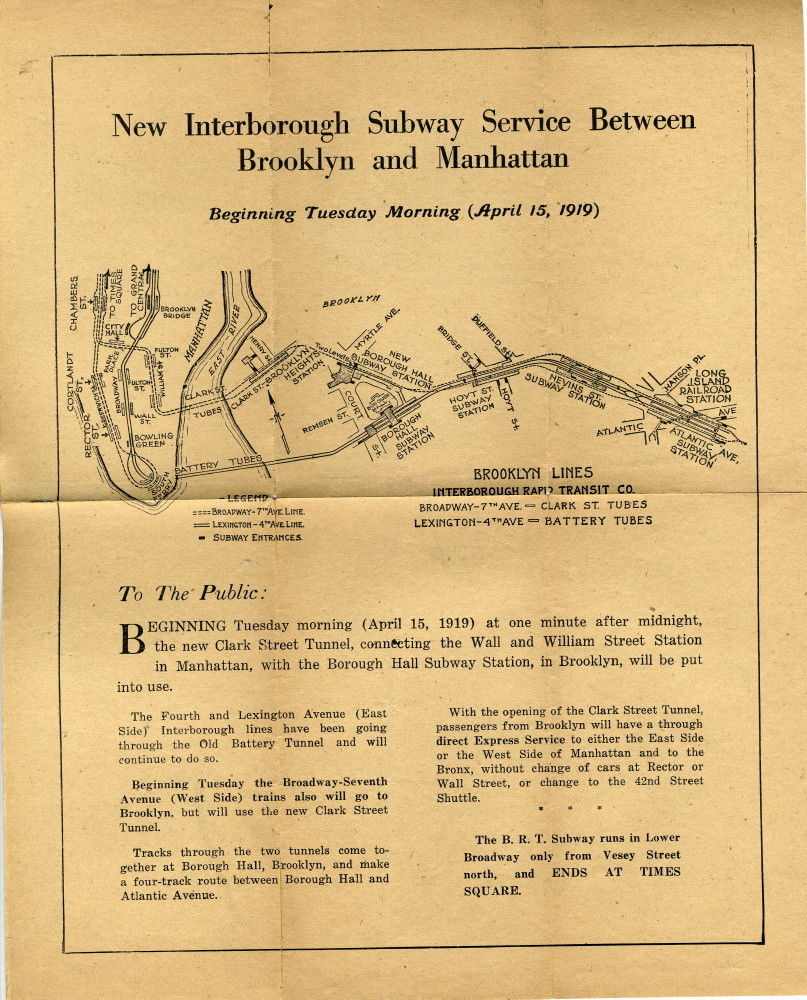
A poster informing the public about the new Interborough Subway Service between Brooklyn and Manhattan, via the Clark Street Tunnel, 1919

On June 3, 1917, the first portion of the Broadway–Seventh Avenue Line south of Times Square–42nd Street, a shuttle to 34th Street–Penn Station, opened; a separate shuttle service, running between 42nd and 34th Streets, was created. This short extension was opened even though the rest of the route was not yet completed in order to handle the mass of traffic to and from Pennsylvania Station. Only the northern part of the station was opened at this time, and piles of plaster, rails, and debris could be seen on the rest of the platforms. This shuttle was extended south to South Ferry, with a shorter shuttle on the Brooklyn branch between Chambers Street and Wall Street, on July 1, 1918.

The new portion of the Lexington Avenue Line from Grand Central to 125th Street opened on July 17, 1918. Until the evening of August 1, 1918, it ran as a shuttle on the local tracks only, terminating at 42nd Street and at 167th Street on the IRT Jerome Avenue Line (where the connection from the elevated IRT Ninth Avenue Line merged). The new "H" system was implemented on August 1, 1918, joining the two halves of the Broadway–Seventh Avenue Line, and the two halves of the Lexington Avenue Line.

An immediate result of the switch was the need to transfer using the 42nd Street Shuttle. The completion of the "H" system doubled the capacity of the IRT system. The local tracks ran to South Ferry, while the express tracks used the Brooklyn Branch to Wall Street, extended into Brooklyn to Atlantic Avenue via the Clark Street Tunnel on April 15, 1919.

The Dual Contracts resulted in the expansion of New York City; people moved to the newly built homes along the newly built subway lines. These homes were affordable, about the same cost as the houses in Brooklyn and Manhattan. The population in Manhattan below 59th Street decreased between the years of 1910 and 1920. People were allowed to move to better parts at the same cost and could have a better and more comfortable life in the suburbs.

=== Independent System ===
Mayor John F. Hylan was a strong advocate of public operation of the subway. He was fired from the BRT after working as a motorman for some time, and he wanted to avoid having to spend more money to recapture the IRT and BRT, so he tried to push the two operators out of business. To that end, Hylan had denied allocating money for the BRT by refusing to build new lines, refusing to raise fares (thereby putting the BRT in more debt), denied building permits so that some major building work lasted longer than planned, and even refused to build a new subway yard for the BRT. The Malbone Street Wreck in 1918 contributed to the losses incurred by the two companies, which led to the bankruptcy of the BRT in 1918. The BRT, however, was reorganized into the BMT. The IRT was almost bankrupt, but managed to complete the line to Flushing by 1928. Subsequently, Hylan drew up plans for a third subway network that would be city-built and -operated, in contrast to the existing subway lines, which were privately operated.

On the other hand, New York City had grown to over five and a half million inhabitants and urgently needed new subway lines. The dual system could not keep pace with this ever-increasing ridership. So, a compromise solution was finally found that would allow Hylan's plans as well as the interests of private operators to be considered. However, the city's and Hylan's long-term goal was the unification and consolidation of the existing subway, with the city operating a unified subway system. The city, bolstered by political claims that the private companies were reaping profits at taxpayer expense, determined that it would build, equip and operate a new system itself, with private investment and without sharing the profits with private entities. This led to the building of the Independent City-Owned Subway (ICOS), sometimes called the Independent Subway System (ISS), the Independent City-Owned Rapid Transit Railroad, or simply The Eighth Avenue Subway after the location of its premier Manhattan mainline. After the city acquired the BMT and IRT in 1940, the Independent lines were dubbed the IND to follow the three-letter initialisms of the other systems.

The original IND system, consisting of the Eighth Avenue mainline and the Sixth Avenue (south of West Fourth Street), Concourse, Culver, and Queens Boulevard branch lines, was entirely underground in the four boroughs that it served, with the exception of the Smith–Ninth Streets and Fourth Avenue stations on the Culver Viaduct over the Gowanus Canal in Gowanus, Brooklyn.

==== Lines ====
As the first line neared completion, New York City offered it for private operation as a formality, knowing that no operator would meet its terms. Thus the city declared that it would operate it itself, formalizing a foregone conclusion. The first line opened without a formal ceremony. The trains began operating their regular schedules ahead of time, and all stations of the Eighth Avenue Line, from 207th Street in Inwood to Hudson Terminal (now World Trade Center), opened simultaneously at one minute after midnight on September 10, 1932.

On January 1, 1936, a second trunk line—the Sixth Avenue Line—opened from West Fourth Street (where it splits from the Eighth Avenue Line) to East Broadway. The new subway line's construction required the suspension of streetcars on the avenue. The city, wanting to save money by not having to underpin the IRT Sixth Avenue Line before the elevated line was closed, bought the line for $12.5 million and terminated operations on December 5, 1938. To help compensate for the loss in service, service on the Ninth Avenue Elevated was increased.

The first section of the Queens Boulevard Line, west from Roosevelt Avenue to 50th Street, opened on August 19, 1933. E trains ran local to Hudson Terminal (today's World Trade Center) in Manhattan, while the GG (predecessor to current G service) ran as a shuttle service between Queens Plaza and Nassau Avenue on the IND Crosstown Line. An extension east to Union Turnpike opened on December 31, 1936. The line was extended to Hillside Avenue and 178th Street, with a terminal station at 169th Street on April 24, 1937. That day, express service began on the Queens Boulevard Line during rush hours, with E trains running express west of 71st–Continental Avenues, and GG trains taking over the local during rush hours. The initial headway for express service was between three and five minutes. 23rd Street–Ely Avenue station opened as an in-fill station on August 28, 1939. Upon its extension into Jamaica, the line drew Manhattan-bound passengers away from the nearby BMT Jamaica Line subway and the Long Island Rail Road.

On July 1, 1937, a third trunk line, the Crosstown Line, opened from Nassau Avenue to Bergen Street. Two years later, on December 15, 1940, local service was begun along the entire IND Sixth Avenue line, including its core part through Midtown Manhattan.

Meanwhile, on the East Side, the need for the Second Avenue Subway had been evident since 1919, when the New York Public Service Commission launched a study at the behest of engineer Daniel L. Turner to determine what improvements were needed in the city's public transport system. The Great Depression resulted in soaring costs, and the expansion became unmanageable, so it was not built along with the other three IND trunk lines. Construction on the first phase of the IND was already behind schedule, and the city and state were no longer able to provide funding. A scaled-down proposal including a turnoff at 34th Street and a connection crosstown was postponed in 1931.

Further revision of the plan and more studies followed. By 1939, construction had been postponed indefinitely, and Second Avenue was relegated to "proposed" status. The 1939 plan for subway expansion took the line not only into the Bronx (by now as a single line to Throggs Neck) but also south into Brooklyn, connecting to the stub of the IND Fulton Street Line at Court Street. Construction of the line resumed in 1972 but was ended during the 1975 fiscal crisis, and work was again restarted in 2007.

=== Expansion plans ===
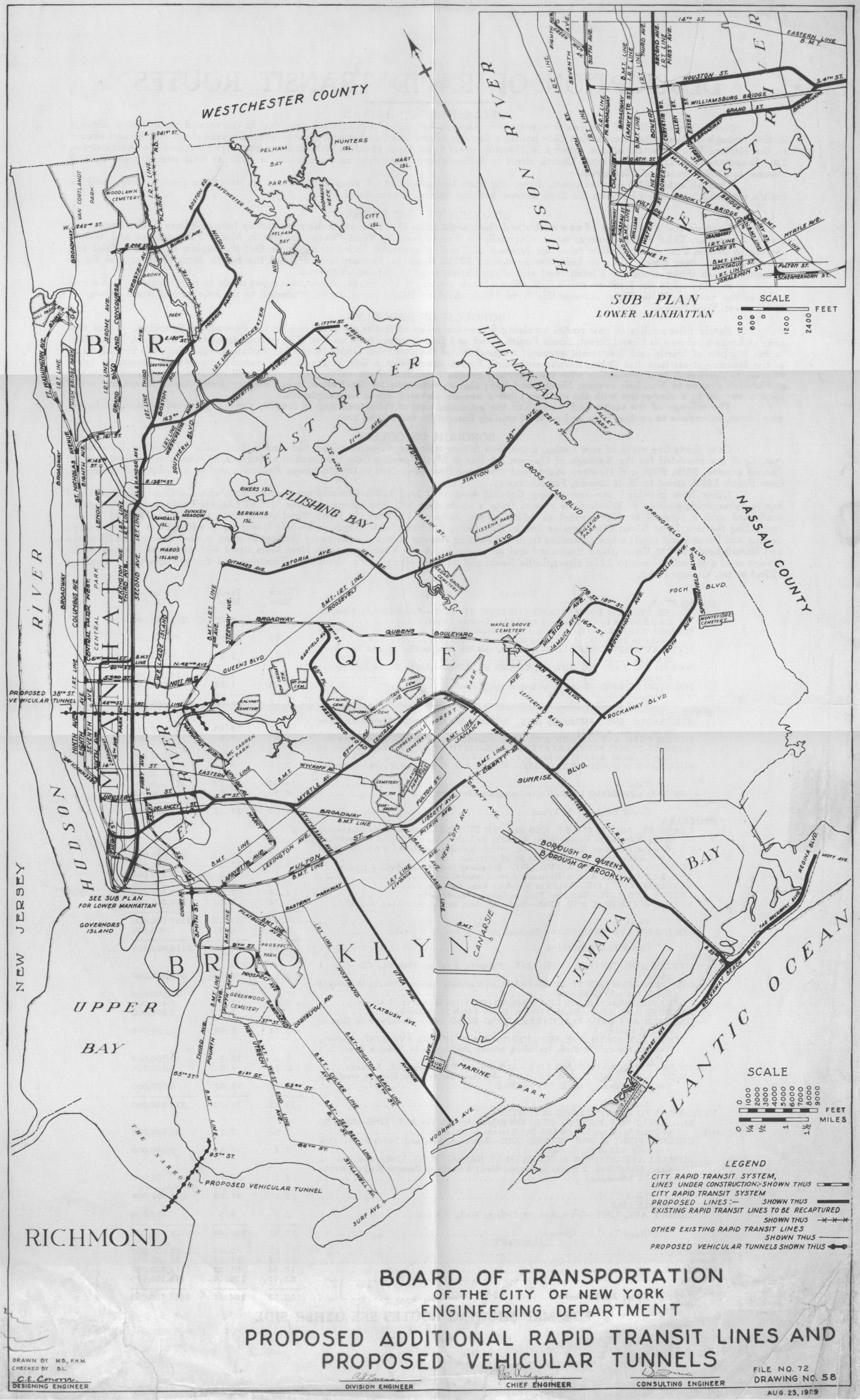
1929 expansion plans

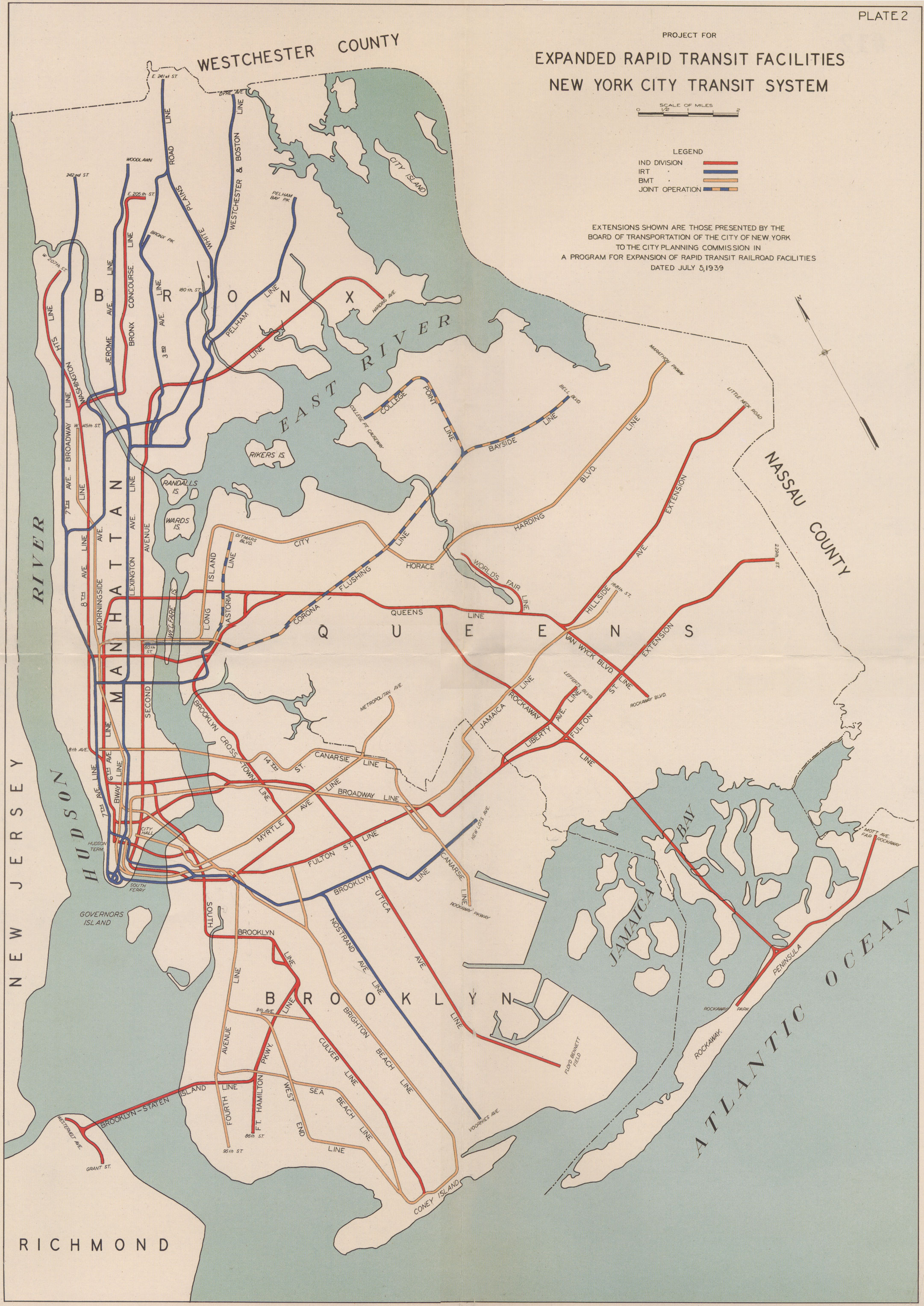
1939 expansion plans

Since the opening of the original New York City Subway line in 1904, various official and planning agencies have proposed numerous extensions to the subway system. One of the better known proposals was the "Second System," which was part of a plan by the Independent Subway to construct new subway lines in addition and take over existing subway lines and railroad right-of-ways. Though most of the routes proposed over the decades have never seen construction, discussion remains strong to develop some of these lines, to alleviate existing subway capacity constraints and overcrowding, the most notable being the Second Avenue Subway. Plans for new lines date back to the early 1910s.

On August 28, 1922, Mayor John Francis Hylan announced that his new system would comprise 100 miles (160 km) of currently operating routes and another 100 miles of new routes, to be completed by December 31, 1925, and in competition with the IRT and BMT.

In 1926, a loop subway service was planned to be built to New Jersey.

The most grandiose plan, conceived in 1929, was to be part of the city-operated IND. By 1939, with unification planned, all three systems were included. As this grandiose expansion was not built, the subway system is only 70% of what it was planned to be. Magnificently engineered, almost entirely underground, with 670 feet (200 m) platforms and flying junctions throughout, the IND system tripled the city's rapid transit debt, contributing to the demise of plans for an ambitious expansion proposed before the first line of the first system was even opened.

== See also ==
- History of the New York City Subway (1940–present)
- History of New York City transportation
- Beach Pneumatic Transit
