= George A. Owens =

American politician

George Asbury Owens (March 4, 1861 – June 1, 1936) was an American politician from New York.

== Life ==
Owens was born on March 4, 1861, in New York City. He initially worked as a cooper, and later became an agent for a brewery in Brooklyn.

In 1893, Owens was elected to the New York State Senate as a Republican, representing New York's 4th State Senate district. He served in the State Senate in 1894 and 1895. He was a delegate to the 1904 Republican National Convention.

Owens held a number of public positions over the years, and worked for the New York State Comptroller's office, served as a Kings County Deputy Sheriff, and was Deputy Commissioner of Records for 10 years. After he retired from the latter position in 1926, he moved to New Kingston, where he became active in local politics and served as Collector of Taxes when he died.

Owens was married three times, first to Jane Morrison, then briefly to Dr May R Owen (from whom he was divorced), then to Jane Ballantine. His three sons were John R., Sylvester M., and James Sherman.

Owens died at his New Kingston home on June 1, 1936. He was buried in the family plot in Cypress Hills Cemetery.

New York State Senate
Preceded by Patrick H. McCarren	New York State Senate; 4th District; 1894–1895	Succeeded by George W. Brush
