= Loring M. Black Jr. =

American politician

Loring Milton Black Jr.
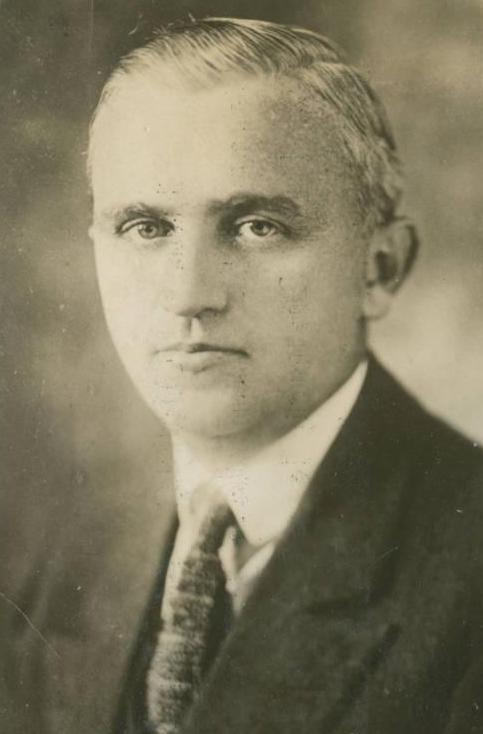

Member of the U.S. House of Representatives from New York's 5th district
- In office March 4, 1923 – January 3, 1935
- Preceded by: Ardolph L. Kline
- Succeeded by: Marcellus H. Evans

Member of the New York Senate
- In office January 1, 1911 – December 31, 1912
- Preceded by: Reuben L. Gledhill
- Succeeded by: Henry P. Velte
- Constituency: 4th district
- In office January 1, 1919 – December 31, 1920
- Preceded by: Charles F. Murphy
- Succeeded by: William T. Simpson
- Constituency: 6th district

Personal details
- Born: May 17, 1886 New York City, US
- Died: May 21, 1956 (aged 70) Washington, D.C., US
- Party: Democratic
- Spouse: Beatrice M. Eddy Black
- Education: Fordham University B.A; Columbia Law School
- Profession: Attorney

Loring Milton Black Jr. (May 17, 1886 – May 21, 1956) was an American lawyer and politician who served six terms as a United States representative from New York from 1923 to 1935.

== Biography ==
Loring was born in New York City on May 17, 1886, a son of Loring M. Black and Elizabeth Black. He attended the public schools of New York City and was a 1903 graduate of Fordham Preparatory School. In 1907, he graduated from Fordham University with a Bachelor of Arts degree. He attended Columbia Law School from 1907 to 1909, was admitted to the bar in 1909, and practiced in New York City.

Black was a member of the New York State Senate (4th D.) in 1911 and 1912. Due to his young age he became known as the "Kid Senator". He was again a member of the State Senate in 1919 and 1920.

Black was elected as a Democrat to the 68th, 69th, 70th, 71st, 72nd and 73rd United States Congresses, holding office from March 4, 1923, to January 3, 1935. Opposing prohibition, he was one of the leaders of the "wet bloc" in Congress. Black served as chairman of the Committee on Claims in the 72nd and 73rd Congresses.

After leaving Congress, Black resumed the practice of law in New York City and Washington, D.C. He died of a heart attack on May 21, 1956, while shopping in a Washington, D.C. drugstore. He was buried at Fort Lincoln Cemetery in Brentwood, Maryland.

== Family ==
In 1913, Black married Beatrice Marie Eddy. Their children included Loring M., Elizabeth V., Jeanne, and John E. The Blacks later divorced, and Loring Black's second wife was Laura Spencer.

New York State Senate
Preceded by Reuben L. Gledhill	New York State Senate; 4th District; 1911–1912	Succeeded by Henry P. Velte
Preceded by Charles F. Murphy	New York State Senate; 6th District; 1919–1920	Succeeded by William T. Simpson
U.S. House of Representatives
Preceded by Ardolph L. Kline	Member of the U.S. House of Representatives from New York's 5th congressional district 1923–1935	Succeeded by Marcellus H. Evans
