= Senator Hardin (disambiguation) =

Martin D. Hardin (1780–1823) was a U.S. Senator from Kentucky from 1816 to 1817. Senator Hardin may also refer to:

- Brian Hardin (born 1965), Nebraska State Senate
- George A. Hardin (1832–1901), New York State Senate

== See also ==
- Senator Harden (disambiguation)
