= James J. Heffernan =

American politician

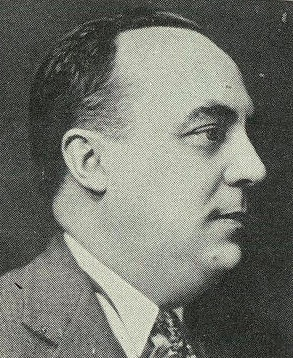

Member of the U.S. House of Representatives from New York
- In office January 3, 1941 – January 3, 1953
- Preceded by: Marcellus H. Evans
- Succeeded by: Emanuel Celler (redistricting)
- Constituency: 5th district (1941–45); 11th district (1945–53)

Personal details
- Born: November 8, 1879 Brooklyn, New York, United States of America
- Died: January 27, 1967 (aged 87) Long Branch, New Jersey, United States of America
- Party: Democratic

James Joseph Heffernan (November 8, 1879 – January 27, 1967) was an American architect and politician who served six terms as a U.S. representative from New York from 1941 to 1953.

== Biography ==
James Joseph Heffernan was born in Brooklyn, New York, on November 8, 1888. He graduated from Bryant & Stratton College in 1906 and Pratt Institute in 1908, and became an architect.

== Political career ==
He was a leader in Brooklyn's Democratic Party, and was a Delegate to several state and national conventions.

Heffernan served as Brooklyn's Highway Commissioner from 1926 to 1933, and was a Delegate to the 1938 state constitutional convention.

=== Congress ===
In 1940 he was elected to Congress as a Democrat. He was reelected five times and served from January 3, 1941, to January 3, 1953. He did not run for reelection in 1952 and resumed working as an architect.

== Death ==
Heffernan died in Long Branch, New Jersey, on January 27, 1967. He was buried at Holy Cross Cemetery in Brooklyn.

His brother William J. Heffernan was also a political figure in Brooklyn.

== Sources ==
- United States Congress. "James J. Heffernan (id: H000443)". Biographical Directory of the United States Congress.
- James J. Heffernan at Political Graveyard

U.S. House of Representatives
Preceded by Marcellus H. Evans	Member of the U.S. House of Representatives from New York's 5th congressional district 1941–1945	Succeeded by James A. Roe
Preceded by Ellsworth B. Buck	Member of the U.S. House of Representatives from New York's 11th congressional district 1945–1953	Succeeded by Emanuel Celler
