= Henry P. Velte =

American politician

Henry P. Velte

Henry P. Velte (1876 – January 23, 1952) was an American politician and lawyer who served in the New York State Senate for a two-year term from 1913 to 1914. A Democrat, he represented New York's fourth district in the 136th and 137th New York State Legislatures.

Velte was born in New York City in 1876. He studied law New York University, was admitted to the bar in 1908, and had law offices in Manhattan.

In 1912, Velte ran for State Senate in the fourth district seat in an effort to replace incumbent Loring M. Black Jr., who was not renominated by the Democrats. Velte secured the nomination in August. In November's election, Velte defeated Republican Henry R. Ritch and Progressive George Hamilton McClelland. Velte served as chairman of the state's Water Diversion Committee. He did not run for reelection in 1914.

Velte died on January 23, 1952, in Brooklyn's Midwood Hospital.

New York State Senate
Preceded by Loring M. Black Jr.	New York State Senate; Fourth District; 1913–1914	Succeeded by Charles C. Lockwood
