= Charles Frederick Murphy =

American politician (1875–1934)

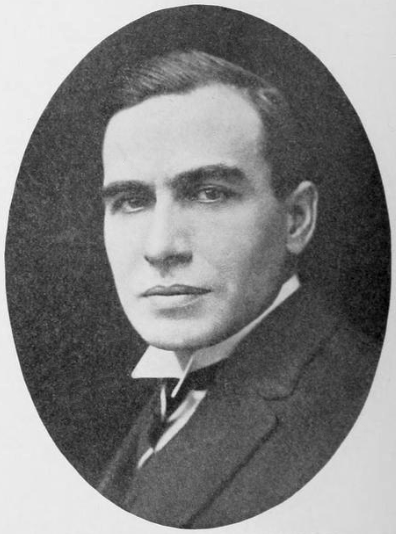
Charles F. Murphy, c. 1914

Charles Frederick Murphy (April 13, 1875 – June 19, 1934) was an American politician from New York.

== Life ==
Charles Frederick Murphy was born in Norwood, New York on April 13, 1875. He attended Norwood Academy and Potsdam Normal School. He was a graduate of Union College in Schenectady, New York, and of the New York Law School. He was admitted to the bar in 1903.

Murphy was a member of the New York State Assembly (Kings Co., 10th D.) in 1905, 1906, 1907, 1908 and 1909; and was Chairman of the Committee on Codes in 1908 and 1909. In 1909, he married Jeannette Grey Hutchinson.

He was a member of the New York State Senate (6th D.) in 1917 and 1918.

Murphy was appointed Special Deputy Attorney General in 1926 to represent the State in Washington before the American-British Arbitration Tribunal.

He died on June 19, 1934, in Danbury Hospital in Danbury, Connecticut, from his injuries after having been hit by a motorist. The collision occurred as Murphy was walking alongside the Route 22 near his summer home, in Brewster, New York.

== Sources ==
- Official New York from Cleveland to Hughes by Charles Elliott Fitch (Hurd Publishing Co., New York and Buffalo, 1911, Vol. IV; pg. 350, 352f, 355 and 357)
- New York Red Book (1918; pg. 113)
- "Murphy 'Shortage' Paid; Brooklyn Republican Leader Gives $16,118 to New Receiver" in NYT on November 23, 1933 (subscription required)
- "C. F. Murphy Dead, Ex-State Senator" in NYT on June 20, 1934 (subscription required)

New York State Assembly
Preceded by Frank H. Cothren	New York State Assembly; Kings County, 10th District; 1905–1909	Succeeded by Charles Harwood
New York State Senate
Preceded by William B. Carswell	New York State Senate; 6th District; 1917–1918	Succeeded by Loring M. Black, Jr.
