= Patrick H. McCarren =

American politician

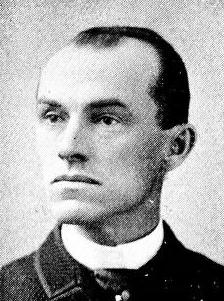
- McCarren c. 1893

Member of the New York Senate
- In office January 1, 1890 – December 31, 1893
- Preceded by: Jacob Worth
- Succeeded by: George A. Owens
- Constituency: 4th district
- In office January 1, 1896 – October 23, 1909
- Preceded by: Martin T. McMahon
- Succeeded by: Thomas C. Harden
- Constituency: 7th district

Member of the New York Assembly from the 6th Kings County district
- In office January 1, 1882 – December 31, 1883
- Preceded by: Patrick J. Tully
- Succeeded by: Thomas F. Farrell
- In office January 1, 1889 – December 31, 1889
- Preceded by: Thomas F. Magner
- Succeeded by: William Emmet Shields

Personal details
- Born: July 8, 1849 East Cambridge, Massachusetts
- Died: October 23, 1909 (aged 60) Brooklyn, New York City, New York
- Party: Democratic
- Spouse: Kate Hogan (d. 1883)

Patrick Henry McCarren (July 8, 1849 in East Cambridge, Massachusetts – October 23, 1909 in Brooklyn, New York City) was an American politician from New York.

== Life ==
The family removed to Brooklyn when Patrick was still a child. He attended Public School Nr. 17 in Brooklyn. Then he became a cooper, and later an oil inspector. He married Kate Hogan (died 1883), a school teacher, and they had five children who all died in infancy.

He was a member of the New York State Assembly (Kings Co., 6th D.) in 1882 and 1883. Then he studied law, and was admitted to the bar, but did not open a law office, and very rarely appeared in court.

He was again a member of the State Assembly in 1889; and a member of the New York State Senate (4th D.) from 1890 to 1893, sitting in the 113th, 114th, 115th and 116th New York State Legislatures.

He was again a member of the State Senate (7th D.) from 1896 until his death in 1909, sitting in the 119th, 120th, 121st, 122nd, 123rd, 124th, 125th, 126th, 127th, 128th, 129th, 130th, 131st and 132nd New York State Legislatures.

In 1900 he proposed another bridge across the East River, between the existing Brooklyn Bridge and Manhattan Bridge.

During the 1904 presidential campaign, Boston millionaire Thomas W. Lawson charged that McCarren, a prominent support of Democratic candidate Alton B. Parker, was on the payroll of Standard Oil at the rate of twenty thousand dollars a year. Lawson offered Senator McCarren $100,000 (equivalent to $3.6 million today) if he would disprove the charge. According to one account, "No denial of the charge was ever made by the Senator." One paper even referred to McCarren as "the Standard Oil serpent of Brooklyn politics."

McCarren was considered the Boss of Brooklyn's Democratic organization by 1909, and Brooklyn's Democrats were known for guarding their independence from that of Tammany Hall in Manhattan. Their motto under McCarren was, "The Tiger Shall Not Cross The Bridge".

Patrick McCarren owned and raced Thoroughbred horses.

He died on October 23, 1909, in St. Catherine's Hospital, in Williamsburg, Brooklyn.

Greenpoint Park in Brooklyn was renamed McCarren Park in his honor.

== Sources ==
- The New York Red Book compiled by Edgar L. Murlin (published by James B. Lyon, Albany NY, 1897; pg. 160f, 403f, 501f and 507)
- M'CARREN IS DEAD in NYT on October 23, 1909

New York State Assembly
Preceded by Patrick J. Tully	New York State Assembly; Kings County, 6th District; 1882–1883	Succeeded by Thomas F. Farrell
Preceded by Thomas F. Magner	New York State Assembly; Kings County, 6th District; 1889	Succeeded by William Emmet Shields
New York State Senate
Preceded by Jacob Worth	New York State Senate; 4th District; 1890–1893	Succeeded by George A. Owens
Preceded by Martin T. McMahon	New York State Senate; 7th District; 1896–1909	Succeeded by Thomas C. Harden
