= Marcellus H. Evans =

American politician

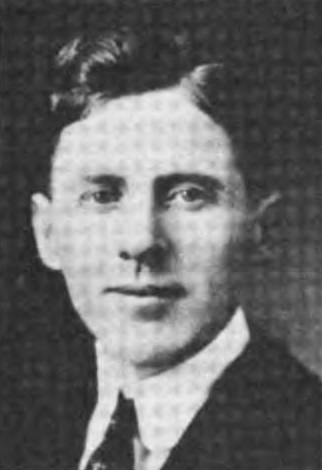
- Evans in 1922

Member of the U.S. House of Representatives from New York's 5th district
- In office January 3, 1935 – January 3, 1941
- Preceded by: Loring M. Black Jr.
- Succeeded by: James J. Heffernan

Personal details
- Born: September 22, 1884 New York City, US
- Died: November 21, 1953 (aged 69) New York City, US
- Party: Democratic

Marcellus Hugh Evans (September 22, 1884 – November 21, 1953) was an American lawyer and politician who served three terms as a U.S. representative from New York from 1935 to 1941.

== Life ==
Born in Brooklyn, he attended St. John the Baptist School and St. James Academy in Brooklyn and was graduated from Fordham University School of Law in 1910. He was admitted to the bar in 1910, and practiced law in Brooklyn.

=== Political career ===
He was a member of the New York State Assembly (Kings Co., 12th D.) in 1922, 1923, 1924, 1925 and 1926.

He was a member of the New York State Senate (6th D.) from 1927 to 1934, sitting in the 150th, 151st, 152nd, 153rd, 154th, 155th, 156th and 157th New York State Legislatures.

=== Congress ===
Evans was elected as a Democrat to the 74th, 75th and 76th United States Congresses, holding office from January 3, 1935, to January 3, 1941. He was an unsuccessful candidate in 1940 for renomination as a Democrat and for election as a Republican to the 77th Congress.

=== Later career and death ===
He resumed the practice of law and died in Brooklyn on November 21, 1953. Interment was in Calvary Cemetery, Queens.

New York State Assembly
Preceded by James G. Moore	New York State Assembly; Kings County, 12th District; 1922–1926	Succeeded by Edward S. Moran, Jr.
New York State Senate
Preceded by James A. Higgins	New York State Senate; 6th District; 1927–1934	Succeeded by Edward J. Coughlin
U.S. House of Representatives
Preceded by Loring M. Black, Jr.	Member of the U.S. House of Representatives from New York's 5th congressional district 1935–1941	Succeeded by James J. Heffernan
