= Daniel J. Carroll =

American politician and businessman (1874–1927)

Member of the New York Senate from the 11th district
- In office 1923–1927
- Preceded by: Abraham L. Katlin
- Succeeded by: Louis J. Jacobson

Member of the New York Senate from the 11th district
- In office 1919–1920
- Preceded by: Bernard Downing
- Succeeded by: Abraham L. Katlin

Member of the New York Senate from the 7th district
- In office 1913–1918
- Preceded by: Thomas C. Harden
- Succeeded by: Charles C. Lockwood

Personal details
- Born: November 29, 1874
- Died: March 6, 1927 (aged 52) Brooklyn, New York, U.S.
- Party: Democratic
- Children: Laurence F. Carroll (son)
- Occupation: Businessman, politician

Daniel J. Carroll (November 29, 1874 – March 6, 1927) was an American businessman and politician from New York. He served in the New York State Senate for three separate terms, representing the 7th and 11th Districts, from 1913 to 1920 and again from 1923 until his death in 1927.

== Early life ==
Carroll was born on November 29, 1874, the son of Lawrence F. Carroll, who served as Warden of the Raymond Street Jail in Brooklyn. He attended the public schools and later engaged in the bottling and sale of mineral water.

== State Senate career ==
Carroll was first elected to the New York State Senate in 1912, representing the 7th District. He served from 1913 to 1918, sitting in the 136th through 141st legislatures.

In November 1913, Carroll was involved in a notable incident when he testified against a political opponent.

Following the 1918 election, he was redistricted to the 11th District, where he served from 1919 to 1920 in the 142nd and 143rd legislatures.

He did not serve in the 1921–1922 session but was re-elected in 1922 to the 11th District. He served from 1923 until his death in 1927, sitting in the 146th through 150th legislatures.

== Death and succession ==
Carroll died on March 6, 1927, at his home in Brooklyn, from pneumonia with complications of erysipelas and diabetes. He was 52 years old.

In August 1927, his son Laurence F. Carroll (born c. 1903) sought to succeed him in the Senate. He was defeated in the Democratic primary but was subsequently substituted onto the Republican ticket after the regular Republican nominee withdrew. In the special election held in November 1927, he was defeated by Democrat Louis J. Jacobson.

New York State Senate
Preceded by Thomas C. Harden	New York State Senate; 7th District; 1913–1918	Succeeded by Charles C. Lockwood
Preceded by Bernard Downing	New York State Senate; 11th District; 1919–1920	Succeeded by Abraham L. Katlin
Preceded by Abraham L. Katlin	New York State Senate; 11th District; 1923–1927	Succeeded by Louis J. Jacobson
