= Thomas C. Harden =

American politician and businessman (c. 1856–1925)

Member of the New York Senate from the 7th district
- In office 1910–1912
- Preceded by: Patrick H. McCarren
- Succeeded by: Daniel J. Carroll

Personal details
- Born: c. 1856
- Died: May 1925 (aged 69)
- Party: Democratic
- Occupation: Businessman, politician

Thomas C. Harden (c. 1856 – May 1925) was an American businessman and politician from New York. He served in the New York State Senate from 1910 to 1912, representing the 7th District in Brooklyn.

== Early life and career ==
Harden owned, along with his brothers, a trucking company in Brooklyn.

== State Senate career ==
On December 21, 1909, Harden was elected to the New York State Senate to fill the vacancy caused by the death of Patrick H. McCarren. He was a member of the State Senate (7th District) from 1910 to 1912, sitting in the 133rd, 134th, and 135th New York State Legislatures.

== Death ==
Harden died in May 1925 at the age of 69.

His brother, Michael George Harden, had died in April 1917.

New York State Senate
Preceded by Patrick H. McCarren	New York State Senate; 7th District; 1910–1912	Succeeded by Daniel J. Carroll
