= Brooklyn and North River Line =

Trolley line in Manhattan and Brooklyn, New York City, United States

The Brooklyn and North River Line, operated by the Brooklyn and North River Railroad, was a trolley line in Manhattan and Brooklyn, New York City, United States. Its route ran from the Desbrosses Street Ferry across Lower Manhattan via the Canal Street Crosstown Line, over a pair of tracks on the east side of the Manhattan Bridge, and to the intersection of Flatbush Avenue and Fulton Street in Downtown Brooklyn. Operation in Manhattan and over the bridge was with conduit electrification, while in Brooklyn it used overhead trolley wire, switching at a plow pit.

The company was formed by a coalition of the three major Manhattan and Brooklyn streetcar operators - New York Railways, the Third Avenue Railway, and Brooklyn Rapid Transit - in competition with the Manhattan Bridge Three Cent Line. The B&NR was operated with Third Avenue cars. The two companies shared trackage on Flatbush Avenue in Brooklyn.

The B&NR originally operated on the west side of the lower deck, now used by subway trains between the BMT Broadway Line and DeKalb Avenue station. When the four tracks on the upper level were completed, the B&NR switched to the two western ones; the Three Cent Line used the eastern pair.

Due to BRT rapid transit operations across the bridge, the B&NR stopped operating by 1919.
