= Manhattan Bridge Three Cent Line =

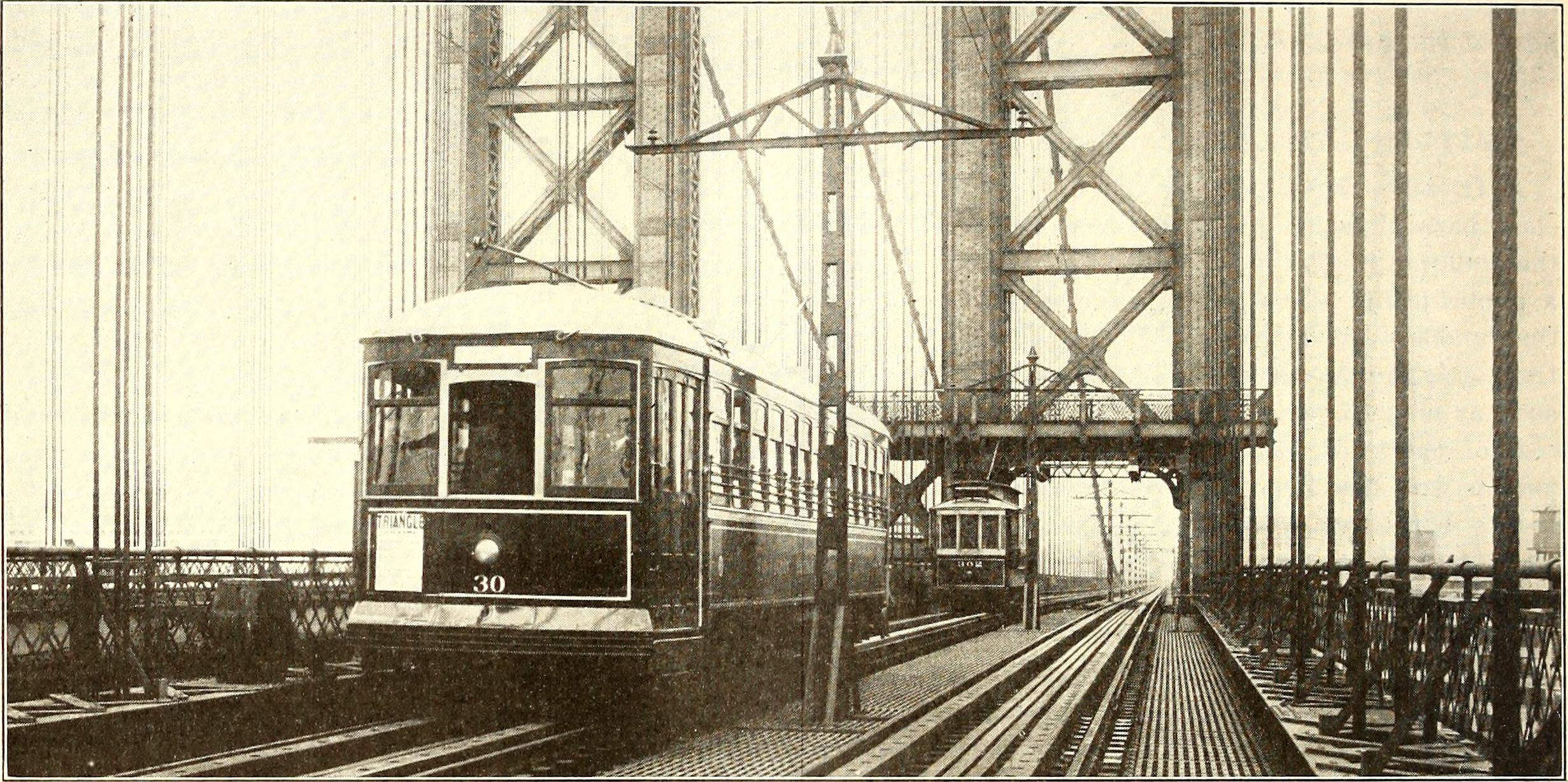
1917 image of a Manhattan Bridge 3¢ Line streetcar on the bridge.

The Manhattan Bridge Three Cent Line was a streetcar company that operated cars over the Manhattan Bridge between the boroughs of Brooklyn and Manhattan in New York City. As the name implied, the fare was only 3 cents per ride.

== History ==
When the Manhattan Bridge was opened on December 31, 1909, it had tracks which were intended to be used by the subways of the Brooklyn Rapid Transit Company (BRT). There were no tracks on either side to connect them to, however. The MBTCL began to run streetcars in 1912, and until 1915 was the only operator of transit over the bridge. In 1915, the trolleys were moved to the upper roadways of the bridge, and the BRT subway lines were connected to the former MBTCL's tracks. The bridge was shared by the Brooklyn and North River Railroad MBTCL intended to sue the B&NR January 1916 over alleged franchise violations.

The MBTCL operated from Fulton Street and Flatbush extension in Downtown Brooklyn to a three track loop at Bowery and Bayard Street in what is today part of Chinatown. The two track terminal at Fulton Street was shared with the Third Avenue Railway System cars that used the north tracks of the bridge. When the bridge first opened, the streetcars used what are now the subway tracks. When the BMT subway was ready to use the bridge, the streetcar tracks were relocated to the upper level, where auto roadways are over the subway tracks today.

The MBTCL continued operating trolleys over the bridge until November 13, 1929, by which time patronage had declined due to the growth of the automobile, as well as rapid transit. The line operated as a shuttle across the bridge using the south tracks of the bridge. The car house was still standing as of 1998.
