= CICE (sea ice model) =

Computer model that simulates sea ice

CICE (/saɪs/) is a computer model that simulates the growth, melt and movement of sea ice. It has been integrated into many coupled climate system models as well as global ocean and weather forecasting models and is often used as a tool in Arctic and Southern Ocean research. CICE development began in the mid-1990s by the United States Department of Energy (DOE), and it is currently maintained and developed by a group of institutions in North America and Europe known as the CICE Consortium. Its widespread use in Earth system science in part owes to the importance of sea ice in determining Earth's planetary albedo, the strength of the global thermohaline circulation in the world's oceans, and in providing surface boundary conditions for atmospheric circulation models, since sea ice occupies a significant proportion (4-6%) of Earth's surface. CICE is a type of cryospheric model.

== Development ==
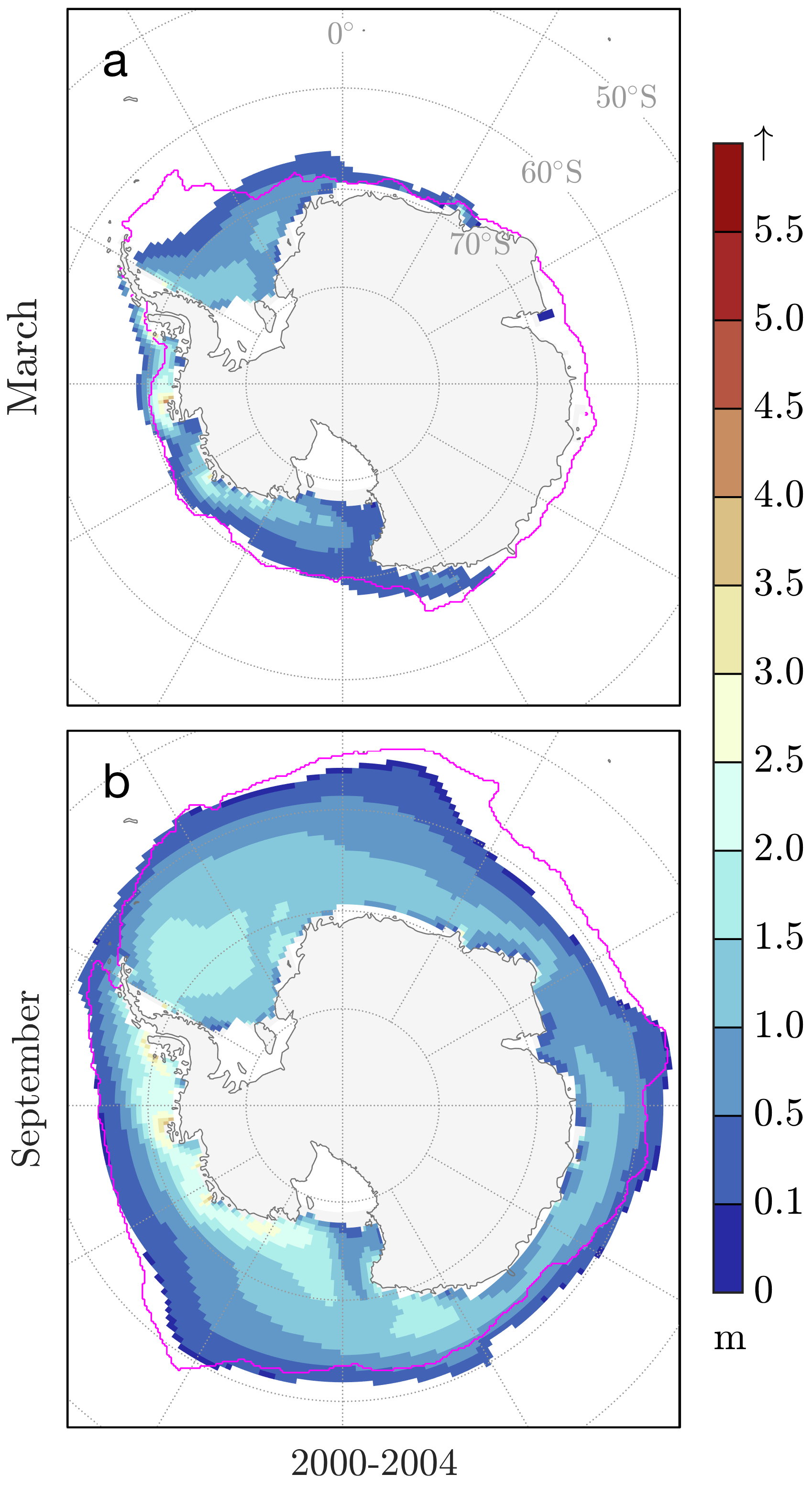
Output from CICE within a coupled climate model: Averaged 2000-2004 (a) March and (b) September Antarctic sea ice thickness and extent (sea ice with greater than 15% concentration) of five ensemble members from the Community Earth System Model (CESM) large ensemble. The magenta contour is the measured ice edge according to the NOAA Climate Data Record.

Development of CICE began in 1994 by Elizabeth Hunke at Los Alamos National Laboratory (LANL). Since its initial release in 1998 following development of the Elastic-Viscous-Plastic (EVP) sea ice rheology within the model, it has been substantially developed by an international community of model users and developers. Enthalpy-conserving thermodynamics and improvements to the sea ice thickness distribution were added to the model between 1998 and 2005. The first institutional user outside of LANL was Naval Postgraduate School in the late-1990s, where it was subsequently incorporated into the Regional Arctic System Model (RASM) in 2011. The National Center for Atmospheric Research (NCAR) was the first to incorporate CICE into a global climate model in 2002, and developers of the NCAR Community Earth System Model (CESM) have continued to contribute to CICE innovations and have used it to investigate polar variability in Earth's climate system. The United States Navy began using CICE shortly after 2000 for polar research and sea ice forecasting and it continues to do so today. Since 2000, CICE development or coupling to oceanic and atmospheric models for weather and climate prediction has occurred at the University of Reading, University College London, the U.K. Met Office Hadley Centre, Environment and Climate Change Canada, the Danish Meteorological Institute, the Commonwealth Science and Industrial Research Organisation, and Beijing Normal University, among other institutions. As a result of model development in the global community of CICE users, the model's computer code now includes a comprehensive saline ice physics and biogeochemistry library that incorporates mushy-layer thermodynamics, anisotropic continuum mechanics, Delta-Eddington radiative transfer, melt-pond physics and land-fast ice. CICE version 6 is open-source software and was released in 2018 on GitHub.

== Keystone Equations ==
There are two main physics equations solved using numerical methods in CICE that underpin the model's predictions of sea ice thickness, concentration and velocity, as well as predictions made with many equations not shown here giving, for example, surface albedo, ice salinity, snow cover, divergence, and biogeochemical cycles. The first keystone equation is Newton's second law for sea ice:

$m\frac{d \mathbf{u}}{d t}=-mf\mathrm{k}\times\mathbf{u}+\tau_a+\tau_w-m\mathrm{\hat{g}}\nabla\mu+\nabla\cdot\mathbf{\sigma}$

where $m$ is the mass per unit area of saline ice on the sea surface, $\mathbf{u}$ is the drift velocity of the ice, $f$ is the Coriolis parameter, $\mathrm{k}$ is the upward unit vector normal to the sea surface, $\tau_a$ and $\tau_w$ are the wind and water stress on the ice, respectively, $\mathrm{\hat{g}}$ is acceleration due to gravity, $\mu$ is sea surface height and $\mathbf{\sigma}$ is internal ice the two-dimensional stress tensor within the ice. Each of the terms require information about the ice thickness, roughness, and concentration, as well as the state of the atmospheric and oceanic boundary layers. Ice mass per unit area $m$ is determined using the second keystone equation in CICE, which describes evolution of the sea ice thickness distribution $g(h)$ for different thicknesses $h$ spread of the area for which sea ice velocity is calculated above:

$\frac{dg}{dt}=\theta + \psi - g(\nabla \cdot \mathbf{u})$

where $\theta$ is the change in the thickness distribution due to thermodynamic growth and melt, $\psi$ is redistribution function due to sea ice mechanics and is associated with internal ice stress $\mathbf{\sigma}$, and $-g(\nabla \cdot \mathbf{u})$ describes advection of sea ice in a Lagrangian reference frame. From this, ice mass is given by:

$m=\rho\int_0^\infty h \, g(h) \, dh$

for density $\rho$ of sea ice.

== Code Design ==
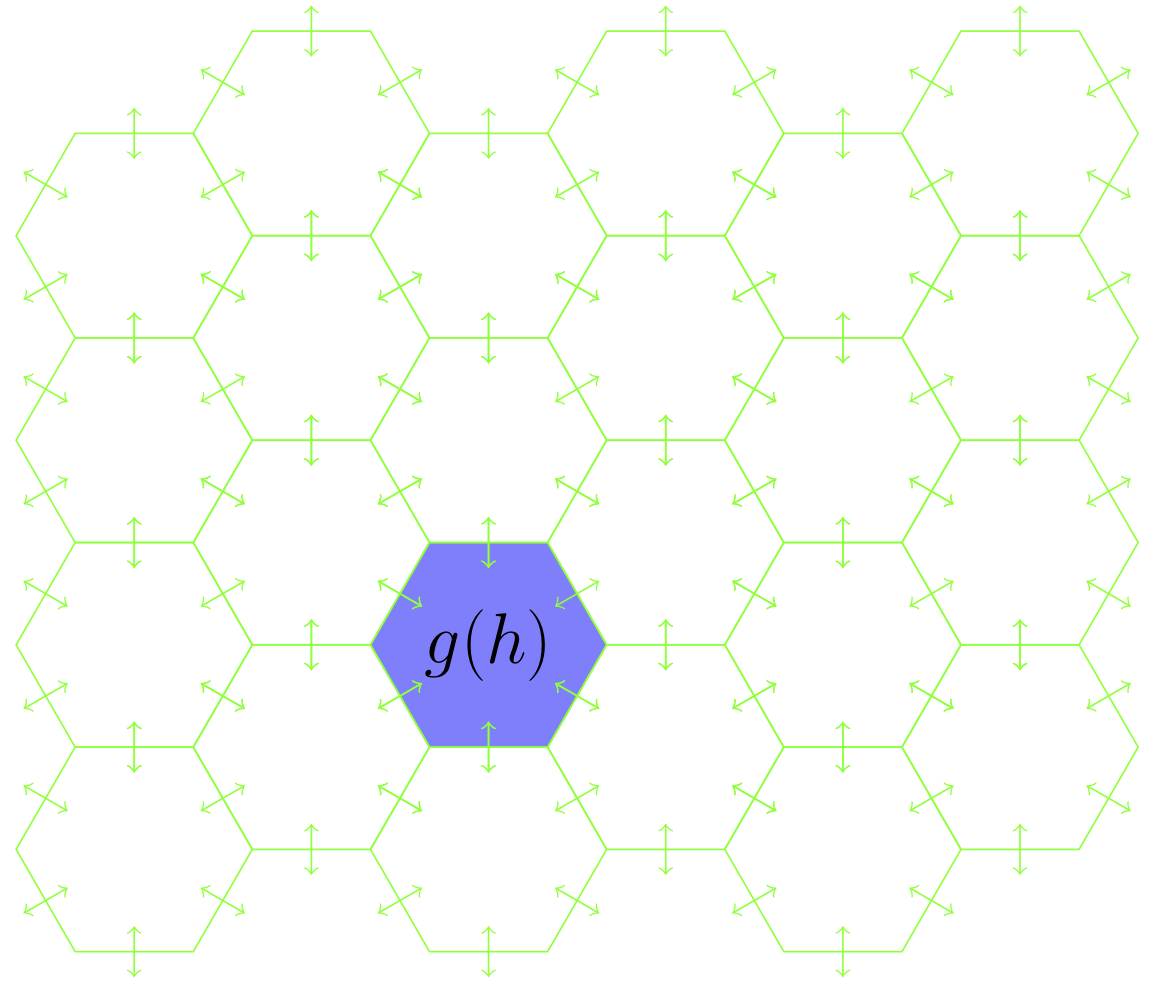
Schematic demonstrating placement of Icepack, in which the thickness distribution $g(h)$ is represented (blue), within the MPAS dycore (green) that solves for momentum evolution and horizontal sea ice advection on the E3SM unstructured grid (arrows)

CICE version 6 is coded in FORTRAN90. It is organized into a dynamical core (dycore) and a separate column physics package called Icepack, which is maintained as a CICE submodule on GitHub. The momentum equation and thickness advection described above are time-stepped on a quadrilateral Arakawa B-grid within the dynamical core, while Icepack solves diagnostic and prognostic equations necessary for calculating radiation physics, hydrology, thermodynamics, and vertical biogeochemistry, including terms necessary to calculate $\tau_a$, $\tau_w$, $\mathbf{\sigma}$, $\theta$, and $\psi$ defined above. CICE can be run independently, as in the first figure on this page, but is frequently coupled with earth systems models through an external flux coupler, such as the CESM Flux Coupler from NCAR for which results are shown in the second figure for the CESM Large Ensemble. The column physics were separated into Icepack for the version 6 release to permit insertion into earth system models that use their own sea ice dynamical core, including the new DOE Energy Exascale Earth System Model (E3SM), which uses an unstructured grid in the sea ice component of the Model for Prediction Across Scales (MPAS), as demonstrated in the final figure.

== See also ==
- Sea ice
- Sea ice microbial communities
- Sea ice emissivity modeling
- Sea ice growth processes
- Sea ice concentration
- Sea ice thickness
- Sea ice physics and ecosystem experiment
- Arctic Ocean
- Southern Ocean
- Climate model
- Weather forecasting
- Northern Sea Route
- Northwest Passage
- Antarctica
