= Polar climate =

Climate classification

Areas of polar climate according to the Köppen climate classification: Tundra climate (ET) Ice cap climate (EF)

Solar radiation has a lower intensity in polar regions because the angle at which it hits the earth is not as direct as at the equator. Another effect is that sunlight has to go through more atmosphere to reach the ground.

The polar climate regions are characterized by a lack of warm summers but with varying winters. Every month a polar climate has an average temperature of less than 10 °C (50 °F). Regions with a polar climate cover more than 20% of the Earth's area. Most of these regions are far from the equator and near the poles, and in this case, winter days are extremely short and summer days are extremely long. They could last for the entirety of each season or longer.

A polar climate consists of cool summers and very cold winters, or, in the case of ice cap climates, no real summer at all, which results in treeless tundras, glaciers, or a permanent or semi-permanent layer of ice. It is identified with the letter E in the Köppen climate classification.

== Subtypes ==
There are two types of polar climate: ET, or tundra climate; and EF, or ice cap climate. A tundra climate is characterized by having at least one month whose average temperature is above 0 °C (32 °F), while an ice cap climate has no months averaging above 0 °C (32 °F). In a tundra climate, even coniferous trees cannot grow, but other specialized plants such as the arctic poppy can grow.

In an ice cap climate, no plants can grow, and ice gradually accumulates until it flows or slides elsewhere. Many high altitude locations on Earth have a climate where no month has an average temperature of 10 °C (50 °F) or higher, but as this is due to elevation, this climate is referred to as Alpine climate. Alpine climate can mimic either tundra or ice cap climate.

== Locations ==
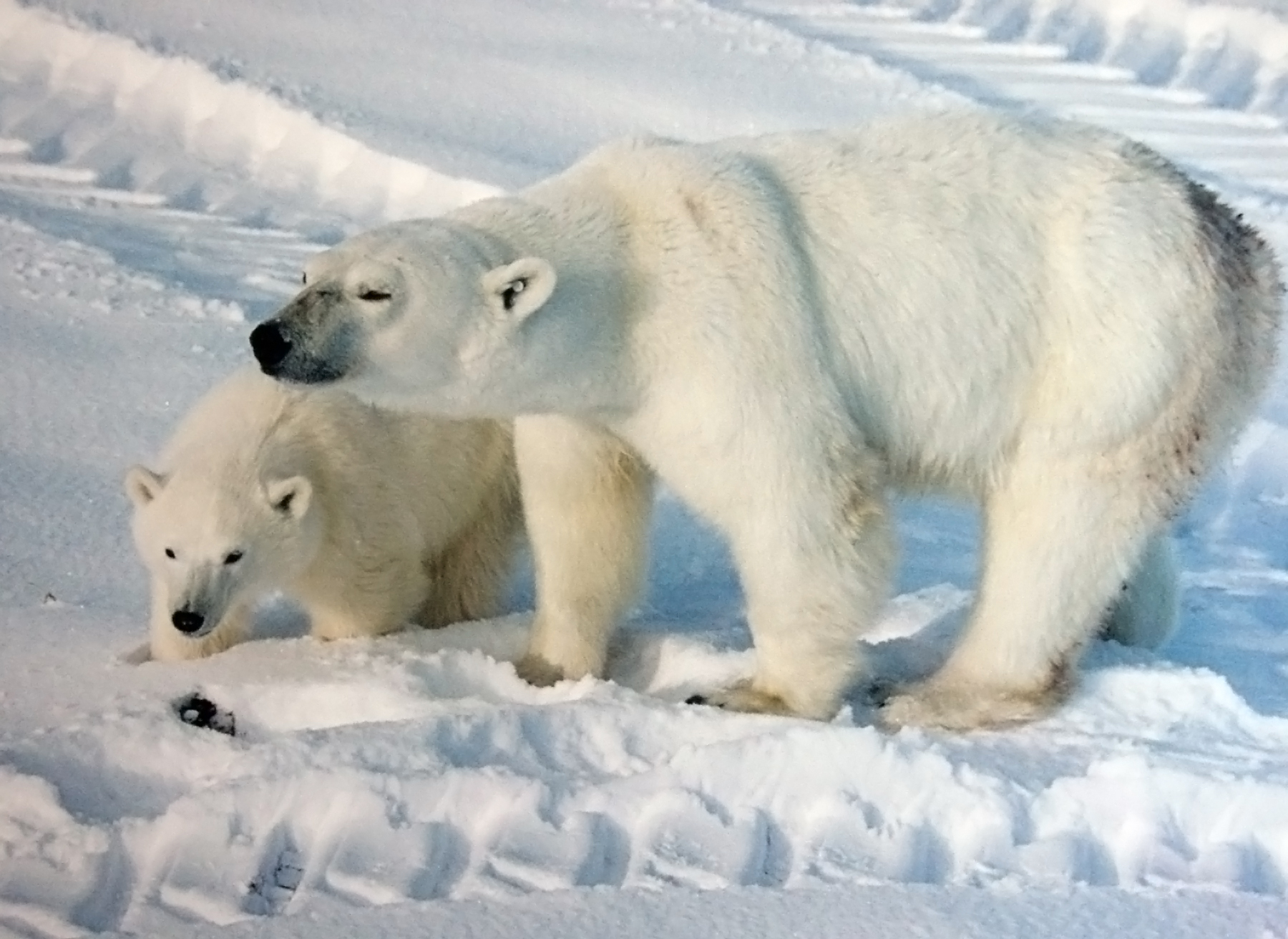
A polar bear with their cub.

On Earth, the only continent where the ice cap polar climate is predominant is Antarctica. All but a few isolated coastal areas on the island of Greenland also have the ice cap climate. Summits of many high mountains also have ice cap climate due to their high elevation. Coastal regions of Greenland that do not have permanent ice sheets have the less extreme tundra climates.

The northernmost part of the Eurasian land mass, from the extreme northeastern coast of Scandinavia and eastwards to the Bering Strait, large areas of northern Siberia and northern Iceland have tundra climate as well. Large areas in northern Canada and northern Alaska have tundra climate, changing to ice cap climate in the most northern parts of Canada.

Southernmost Argentina (Tierra del Fuego where it abuts the Drake Passage) and such subantarctic islands such as the South Shetland Islands and the Falkland Islands have tundra climates of slight temperature range, in which no month is as warm as 10 °C (50 °F). These subantarctic lowlands are found closer to the equator than the coastal tundras of the Arctic basin. Summits of many mountains of Earth also have polar climates, due to their higher elevations.

=== Arctic ===
A map of the Arctic. The red line indicates the 10°C isotherm in July and the white area shows the average minimum extent of sea ice in summer as of 1975.

Some parts of the Arctic are covered by ice (sea ice, glacial ice, or snow) year-round, especially at the most poleward parts; and nearly all parts of the Arctic experience long periods with some form of ice or snow on the surface. Average January temperatures range from about −40 to 0 °C (−40 to 32 °F), and winter temperatures can drop below −50 °C (−58 °F) over large parts of the Arctic. Average July temperatures range from about −10 to 10 °C (14 to 50 °F), with some land areas occasionally exceeding 30 °C (86 °F) in summer.

The Arctic consists of an ocean that is almost surrounded by landmasses like Russia and Canada. As such, the climate of much of the Arctic is moderated by the ocean water, which can never have a temperature below −2 °C (28 °F). In winter, this relatively warm water, even though covered by the polar ice pack, keeps the North Pole from being the coldest place in the Northern Hemisphere, and it is also part of the reason that Antarctica is so much colder than the Arctic. In summer, the presence of the nearby water keeps coastal areas from warming as much as they might otherwise, just as it does in temperate regions with maritime climates.

=== Antarctica ===
The climate of Antarctica is the coldest on Earth. Antarctica has the lowest naturally occurring temperature ever recorded: −89.2 °C (−128.6 °F) at Vostok Station in 1983. It is also extremely dry, technically a desert, or so called polar desert, averaging 166 millimetres (6.5 in) of precipitation per year, as weather fronts rarely penetrate far into the continent.

=== Mountains ===
Summits of most mountains also have polar climates, despite being in lower latitudes, due to their high elevations. The highest mountains of the Rocky Mountains, Alps, and the Caucasus have tundra climate. Some mountains of the Andes, the Saint Elias Mountains, and most mountains of the Himalayas, the Karakoram, the Hindu Kush Range, Pamir Mountains, the Tian Shan Mountains, and the Alaska Range also have ice cap climates at extremely high elevations, in addition to tundra climates at relatively lower elevations. Only the summit of Mount Rainier has an ice cap climate in the Cascade Range.

== Quantifying polar climate ==
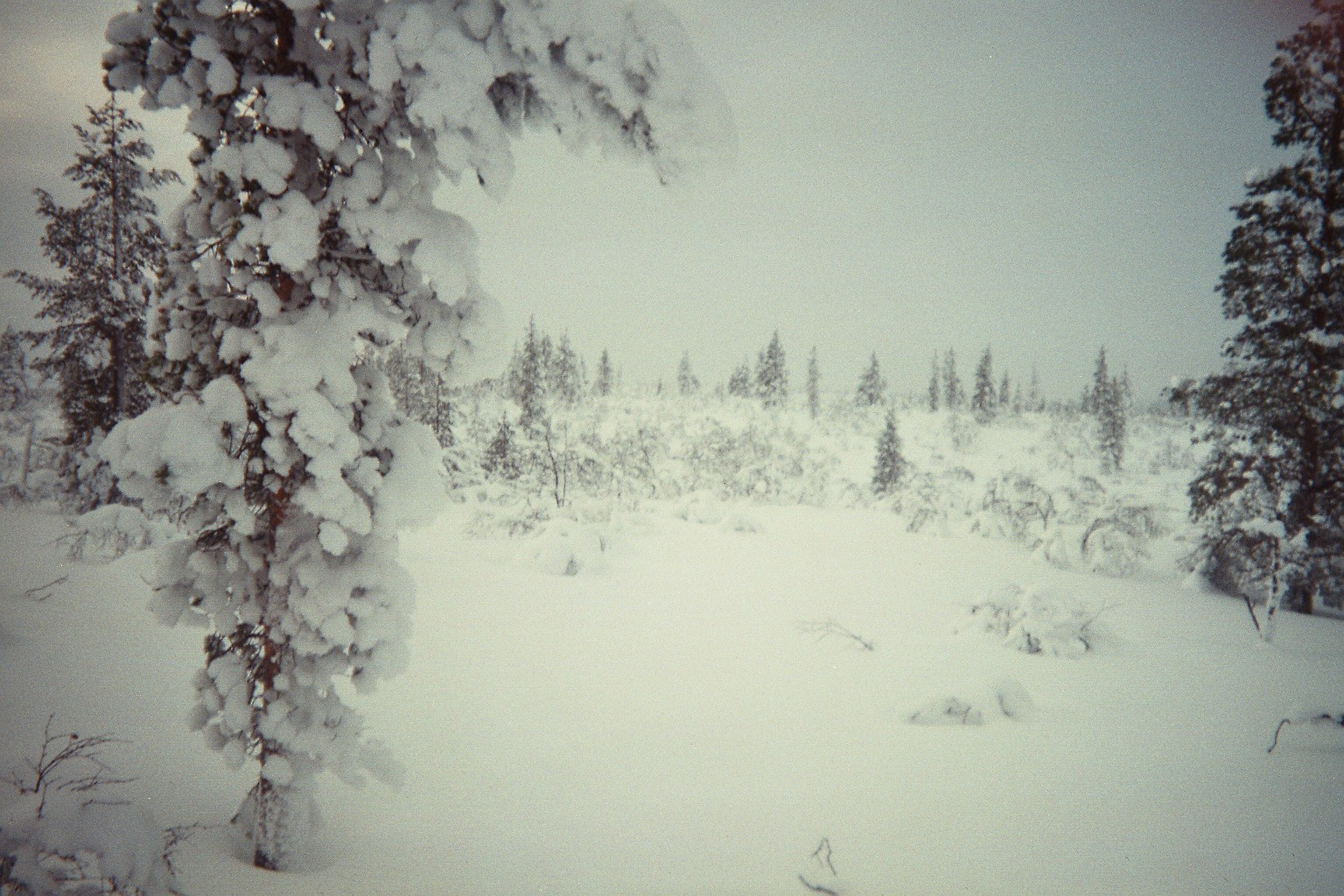
A snowy landscape of Inari located in Lapland, Finland.

There have been several attempts at quantifying what constitutes a polar climate.

Climatologist Wladimir Köppen demonstrated a relationship between the Arctic and Antarctic tree lines and the 10 °C (50 °F) summer isotherm; i.e., places where the average temperature in the warmest calendar month of the year is below the fixed threshold of 10 °C (50 °F) cannot support forests. See Köppen climate classification for more information.

Otto Nordenskjöld theorized that winter conditions also play a role: His formula is W = 9 − 0.1 C, where W is the average temperature in the warmest month and C the average of the coldest month, both in degrees Celsius. For example, if a particular location had an average temperature of −20 °C (−4 °F) in its coldest month, the warmest month would need to average 11 °C (52 °F) or higher for trees to be able to survive there as 9 − 0.1(−20) = 11.

Nordenskiöld's line tends to run to the north of Köppen's near the west coasts of the Northern Hemisphere continents, south of it in the interior sections, and at about the same latitude along the east coasts of both Asia and North America. In the Southern Hemisphere, all of Tierra del Fuego lies outside the polar region in Nordenskiöld's system, but part of the island (including Ushuaia, Argentina) is reckoned as being within the Antarctic under Köppen's.

In 1947, Holdridge improved on these schemes, by defining biotemperature: the mean annual temperature, where all temperatures below 0 °C or 32 °F (and above 30 °C or 86 °F) are treated as 0 °C, because it makes no difference to plant life, being dormant. If the mean biotemperature is between 1.5 and 3 °C (34.7 and 37.4 °F), Holdridge quantifies the climate as subpolar, or alpine, if the low temperature is caused by elevation.

== See also ==
- Arctic oscillation
- Climate change in the Arctic
- Global warming in Antarctica
