= Measurement of sea ice =

Records made for navigational safety and environmental monitoring

Dr. Claire Parkinson explains how and why NASA studies Arctic sea ice.

Animation of Minimum Annual Sea Ice Extent over the Arctic from 1979 to 2012.

In this animation, the daily Arctic sea ice and seasonal land cover change progress through time, from May 16, 2013, through September 12, 2013, when the sea ice reached its minimum area of coverage for 2013.

Measurement of sea ice is important for safety of navigation and for monitoring the environment, particularly the climate. Sea ice extent interacts with large climate patterns such as the North Atlantic oscillation and Atlantic Multidecadal Oscillation, to name just two, and influences climate in the rest of the globe.

The amount of sea ice coverage in the arctic has been of interest for centuries, as the Northwest Passage was of high interest for trade and seafaring. There is a longstanding history of records and measurements of some effects of the sea ice extent, but comprehensive measurements were sparse till the 1950s and started with the satellite era in the late 1970s. Modern direct records include data about ice extent, ice area, concentration, thickness, and the age of the ice. The current trends in the records show a significant decline in Northern Hemisphere sea ice and a small but statistically significant increase in the winter Southern Hemisphere sea ice.

Furthermore, current research comprises and establishes extensive sets of multi-century historical records of arctic and subarctic sea ice and uses, among others high-resolution paleo-proxy sea-ice records. The arctic sea ice is a dynamic climate-system component and is linked to the Atlantic multidecadal variability and the historical climate over various decades. There are circular changes of sea ice patterns but so far no clear patterns based on modeling predictions.

== Methods of measuring sea ice ==
=== Early observations ===
Records assembled by Vikings showing the number of weeks per year that ice occurred along the north coast of Iceland date back to A.D. 870, but a more complete record exists since 1600. More extensive written records of Arctic sea ice date back to the mid-18th century. The earliest of those records relate to Northern Hemisphere shipping lanes, but records from that period are sparse. Air temperature records dating back to the 1880s can serve as a stand-in (proxy) for Arctic sea ice, but such temperature records were initially collected at only 11 locations. Russia's Arctic and Antarctic Research Institute has compiled ice charts dating back to 1933. Today, scientists studying Arctic sea ice trends can rely on a fairly comprehensive record dating back to 1953, using a combination of satellite records, shipping records, and ice charts from several countries.

In the Antarctic, direct data prior to the satellite record are even more sparse. To try to extend the historical record of Southern Hemisphere sea ice extent further back in time, scientists have been investigating various proxies for sea ice extent. One is records kept by Antarctic whalers that document the location of all whales caught and relate to sea ice observations directly. There seems to be an abrupt mid-twentieth-century decline in Antarctic sea-ice extent from whaling records, the direct global estimates of the Antarctic sea-ice cover from satellite observations, since the 1970 provide no clear trends. Because whales tend to congregate near the sea ice edge to feed, their locations could be a proxy for the ice extent. Other proxies use the presence of phytoplankton-derived organic compounds and other extremophiles traces in Antarctic ice cores and sediments. Since phytoplankton grow most abundantly along the edges of the ice pack, the concentration of this sulfur-containing organic compounds and their geochemistry provide indicators of how far the ice edge extended from the continent. There are further extensive sets of multicentury historical records of arctic and subarctic sea ice and uses, among others high-resolution paleo proxy sea-ice records.

=== Satellites ===
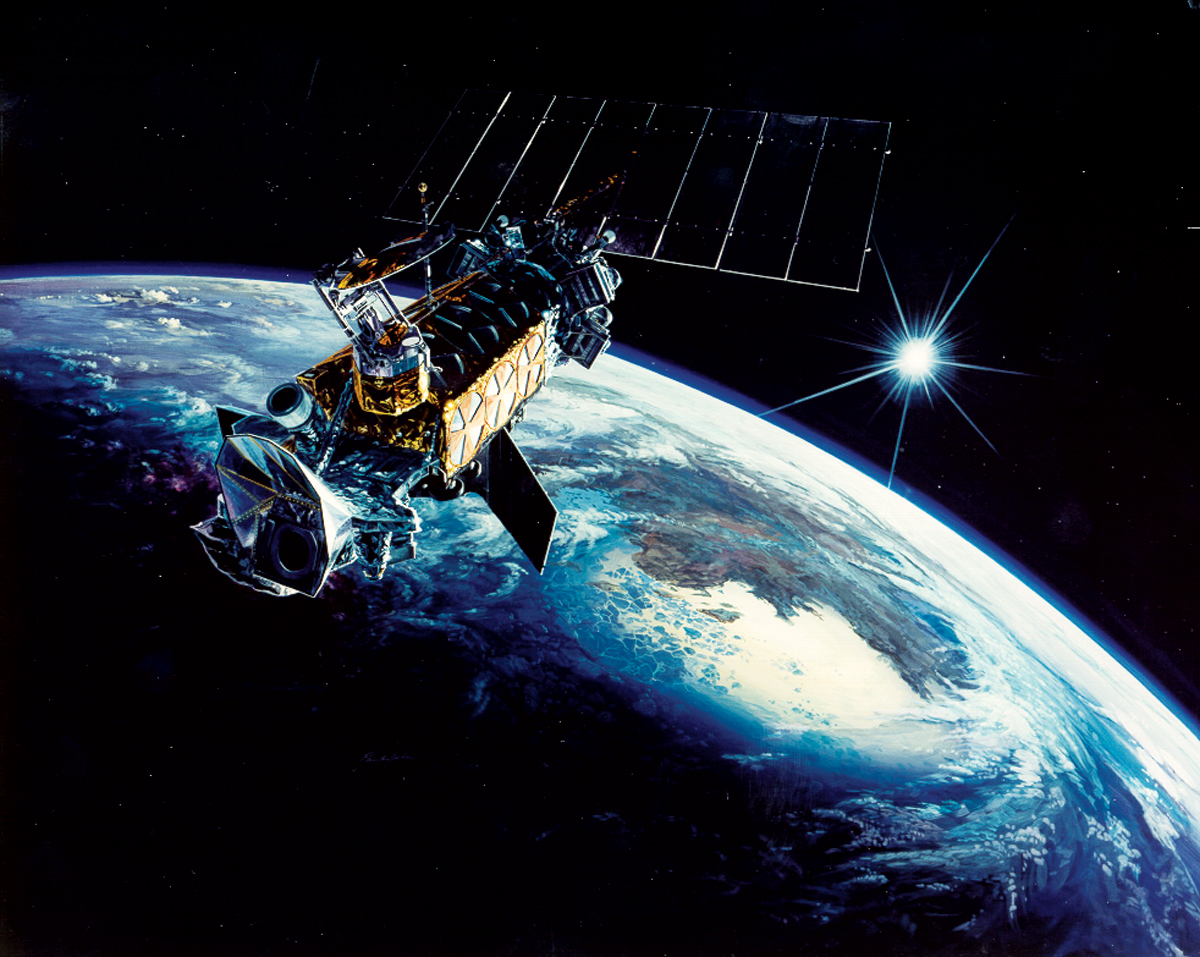
DMSP satellite

Useful satellite data concerning sea ice began in December 1972 with the Electrically Scanning Microwave Radiometer (ESMR) instrument. However, this was not directly comparable with the later SMMR/SSMI, and so the practical record begins in late 1978 with the launch of NASA's Scanning Multichannel Microwave Radiometer (SMMR) satellite., and continues with the Special Sensor Microwave/Imager (SSMI). Advanced Microwave Scanning Radiometer (AMSR) and Cryosat-2 provide separate records.

Since 1979, satellites have provided a consistent continuous record of sea ice. However, the record relies on stitching together measurements from a series of different satellite-borne instruments, which can lead to errors associated with intercalibration across the sensor changes. Satellite images of sea ice are made from observations of microwave energy radiated from the Earth's surface. Because ocean water emits microwaves differently from sea ice, ice "looks" different from water to the satellite sensor—see sea ice emissivity modelling. The observations are processed into digital picture elements, or pixels. Each pixel represents a square surface area on Earth. The first instruments provided approximately 25 kilometers by 25 kilometers resolution; later instruments higher. Algorithms examine the microwave emissions, and their vertical and horizontal polarisations, and estimate the ice area.

Sea ice may be considered in terms of total volume, or in terms of areal coverage. Estimates of ice volume are harder to obtain as they require a knowledge of the ice thickness, which is complicated to measure directly; efforts such as PIOMAS use a combination of observations and modelling to estimate total volume.

There are two ways to express the total polar ice cover: ice area and ice extent. To estimate ice area, scientists calculate the percentage of sea ice in each pixel, multiply by the pixel area, and total the amounts. Scientists set a threshold percentage to estimate ice extent, and count every pixel meeting or exceeding that threshold as "ice-covered." The common threshold is 15%.

The threshold-based approach may seem less accurate, but it has the advantage of being more consistent. When scientists are analyzing satellite data, it is easier to say whether there is or is not at least 15% ice cover in a pixel than it is to say, for example, whether the ice cover is 70 percent or 75 percent. By reducing the uncertainty in the amount of ice, scientists can be more certain that changes in sea ice cover over time are real.

A careful analysis of satellite radar altimetry echoes can distinguish between those backscattered from the open ocean, new ice, or multi-year ice. The difference between the elevation of the echoes from snow/sea ice and open water gives the elevation of the ice above the ocean; the ice thickness can be computed from this. The technique has a limited vertical resolution and is easily confused by the presence of even small amounts of open water. Hence it has mostly been used in the Arctic, where the ice is thicker and more continuous. Recent advancements led to the development of new experimental sea-ice thickness products from satellite radar altimetry during the Arctic melt season.

=== Submarines ===
Starting in 1958 U. S. Navy submarines collected upward-looking sonar profiles, for navigation and defense, and converted the information into estimates of ice thickness. Data from U. S. and Royal Navy submarines available from the NSIDC includes maps showing submarine tracks. Data are provided as ice draft profiles and as statistics derived from the profile data. Statistics files include information concerning ice draft characteristics, keels, level ice, leads, undeformed and deformed ice.

=== Buoys ===
Buoys are placed on the ice to measure ice properties and weather conditions by the participants of the International Arctic Buoy Program and its sister, the International Programme for Antarctic Buoys. Buoys can have sensors to measure air temperature, atmospheric pressure, snow and ice thickness, snow and ice temperature, ocean currents, sea ice motion, sea level pressure, sea surface temperature and salinity, skin temperature, surface winds, water temperature, longwave and shortwave radiation. Ice mass balance (IMB) buoys measure air, snow, ice and seawater in situ temperature and temperature after internal heating cycles. Such heating cycles allow more accurate identification of snow-ice and ice-water interfaces. Temperature buoys allow to estimate conductive, latent and ocean heat fluxes for undeformed ice and for pressure ridges.

=== Upward looking sonar ===
Upward looking sonar (ULS) devices can be deployed under polar ice over a period of months or even years, and can provide a complete profile of ice thickness for a single site. Sonars are directly measuring sea ice draft, so accurate estimate of sea ice thickness requires knowledge about snow thickness, snow and sea-ice density. The accuracy of sonar measurements also depends on the salinity of the seawater between sonar and sea ice, and many sonar installations also include CTD and ADCP. Upward looking or multibeam sonars can be also mounted on remotely operated underwater vehicles (ROV) to investigate sea ice draft over the diameter of several hundreds of meters and several months.

=== Auxiliary observations ===
Auxiliary observations of sea ice are made from shore stations, ships, and from aircraft.

Although in recent years remotely sensed data has come to play a major role in sea ice analysis, it is not yet possible to compile a complete and accurate picture of sea ice conditions from this data source alone. Auxiliary sea ice observations play a major role in confirming remotely sensed ice information or providing important corrections to the overall picture of ice conditions.

The most important auxiliary sea ice observation is the location of the ice edge. Its value reflects both the importance of the ice edge location in general and the difficulty of accurately locating the ice edge with remotely sensed data. It is also useful to provide a description of the ice edge in terms of indications of freezing or thawing, wind-driven advance or retreat, and compactness or diffuseness. Other important auxiliary information includes the location of the icebergs, floebergs, ice islands, old ice, ridging and hummocking. These ice features are poorly monitored by remote sensing techniques but are very important aspects of the ice cover.

== Types of measurements ==
=== Sea ice extent ===
Sea Ice Extent over the Arctic (OSI SAF data). View source data.

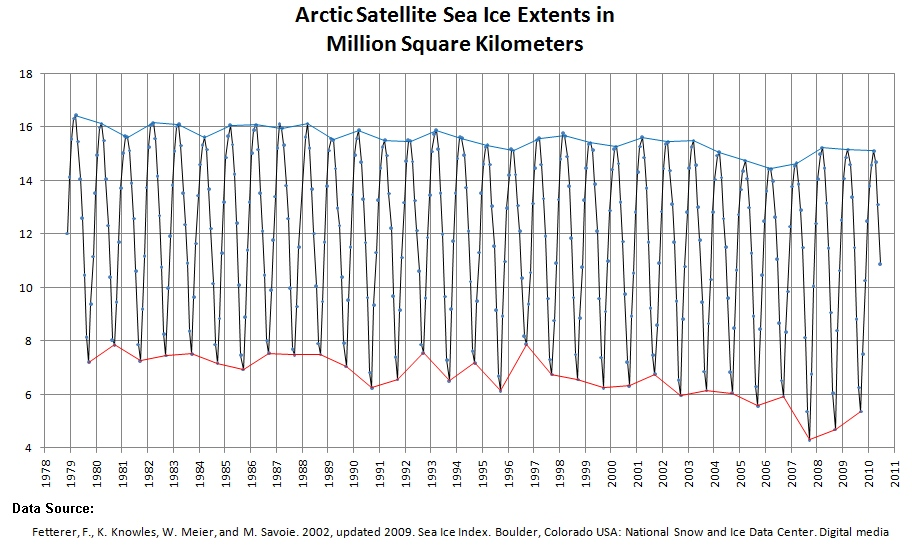
Sea Ice in the Arctic Ocean fluctuates with the seasons.

Sea ice extent is the area of sea with a specified amount of ice, usually 15%. To satellite microwave sensors, surface melt appears to be open water rather than water on top of sea ice. So, while reliable for measuring area most of the year, the microwave sensors are prone to underestimating the actual ice concentration and area when the surface is melting.

=== Sea ice area ===
To estimate ice area, scientists calculate the percentage of sea ice in each pixel, multiply by the pixel area, and total the amounts. To estimate ice extent, scientists set a threshold percentage, and count every pixel meeting or exceeding that threshold as "ice-covered." The National Snow and Ice Data Center, one of NASA's Distributed Active Archive Centers, monitors sea ice extent using a threshold of 15 percent.

=== Sea ice concentration ===
Sea ice concentration is the percentage of an area that is covered with sea ice.

=== Sea ice thickness ===
Sea ice thickness decreases over time, and increases when winds and currents push the ice together. The European Space Agency's Cryosat-2 satellite was launched in April 2010 on a quest to map the thickness and shape of the Earth's polar ice cover. Its single instrument – a SAR/Interferometric Radar Altimeter is able to measure the sea ice freeboard.

=== Sea ice age ===
The age of the ice is another key descriptor of the state of the sea ice cover, since older ice tends to be thicker and more resilient than younger ice. Sea ice rejects salt over time and becomes less salty resulting in a higher melting point. A simple two-stage approach classifies sea ice into first year and multiyear ice. First-year is ice that has not yet survived a summer melt season, while multi-year ice has survived at least one summer and can be several years old. See sea ice growth processes.

=== Sea ice mass balance ===
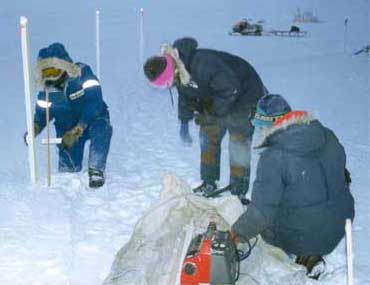
Measuring Sea Ice Mass Balance

Sea ice mass balance is the balance of how much the ice grows in the winter and melts in the summer. For Arctic sea ice virtually all of the growth occurs on the bottom of the ice. Melting occurs on both the top and the bottom of the ice. In the vast majority of cases all of the snow melts during the summer, typically in just a couple of weeks. The mass balance is a powerful concept since it is the great integrator of the heat budget. If there is a net increase of heat, then the ice will thin. A net cooling will result in thicker ice.

Making direct measurements of the mass balance is simple. An array of stakes and thickness gauges is used to measure ablation and accumulation of ice and snow at the top and bottom of the ice cover. In spite of the importance of mass balance measurements and the relatively simple equipment involved in making them, there are few observational results. This is due, in large part, to the expense involved in operating a long-term field camp to serve as the base for these studies.

=== Sea ice volume ===
Blue: Seasonal variation and long-term decrease of Arctic sea ice volume as determined by measurement backed numerical modelling.

There are no Arctic-wide or Antarctic-wide measurements of the volume of sea ice, but the volume of the Arctic sea ice is calculated using the Pan-Arctic Ice Ocean Modeling and Assimilation System (PIOMAS) developed at the University of Washington Applied Physics Laboratory/Polar Science Center. PIOMAS blends satellite-observed sea ice concentrations into model calculations to estimate sea ice thickness and volume. Comparison with submarine, mooring, and satellite observations help increase the confidence of the model results.

ICESat was a laser altimeter equipped satellite, which could measure the freeboard of ice flows. Its active service period was from February 2003 to October 2009. Together with a set of auxiliary data like ice density, snow cover thickness, air pressure, water salinity one can calculate the flow thickness and thus its volume. Its data have been compared with the respective PIOMAS data and a reasonably agreement has been found.

Cryosat-2, launched in April 2010, has the ability to measure the freeboard of ice flows, just like ICESat, only that it uses radar instead of laser pulses. Data is calculated with the PIOMAS model.

== Trends in the data ==
Reliable and consistent records for all seasons are only available during the satellite era, from 1979 onwards.

=== Northern hemisphere ===
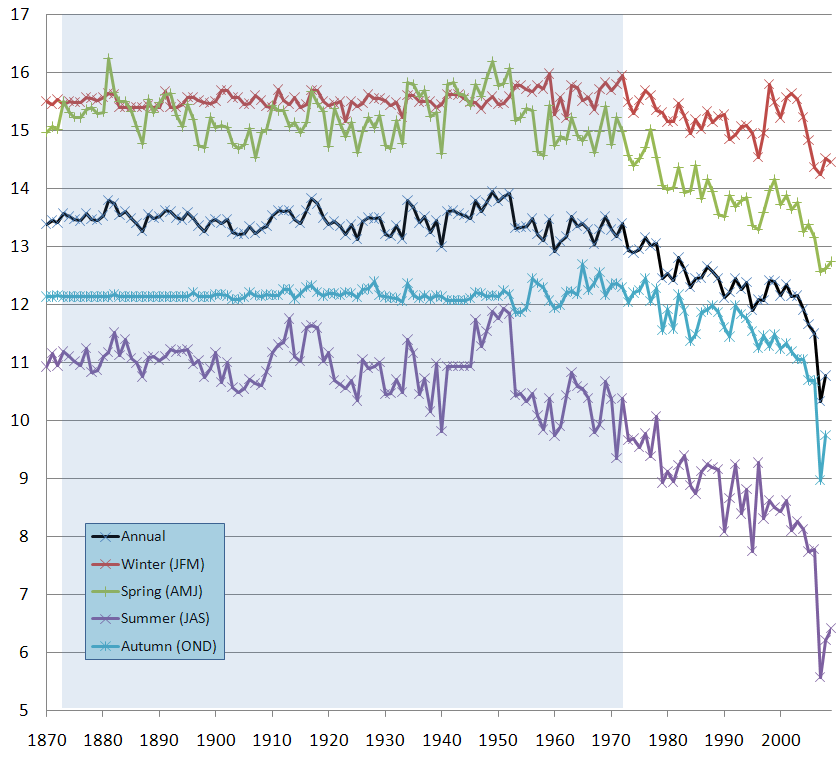
1870–2000 Northern hemisphere sea ice extent in million square kilometers. Blue shading indicates the pre-satellite era; data then is less reliable. In particular, the near-constant level extent in Autumn up to 1940 reflects lack of data rather than a real lack of variation.

According to scientific measurements, both the thickness and extent of summer sea ice in the Arctic have shown a dramatic decline over the past thirty years.

=== Southern hemisphere ===
Records before the satellite era are sparse. William K. de la Mare, 1997, in Abrupt mid-twentieth-century decline in Antarctic sea-ice extent from whaling records found a southwards shift in ice edge based on whaling records; these findings have been questioned, but later papers by de la Mare and by Cotte support the same conclusion.

The satellite-derived Antarctic sea ice trends show pronounced increase in the central Pacific sector by ~4–10% per decade and a decrease in the Bellingshausen/western Weddell sector with similar percentages but lower extent. There is a close connection to the Antarctic Oscillation of the further and impacts of positive polarities of the El Niño-Southern Oscillation (ENSO) for the latter. The magnitude of the ice changes associated with the AAO and ENSO are smaller than the regional ice trends and local (or less understood large) scale processes still need to be investigated for a complete explanations.

=== Use of 1981 to 2010 as a baseline ===
Scientists use the 1981 to 2010 average because it provides a consistent baseline for year-to-year comparisons of sea ice extent. Thirty years is considered a standard baseline period for weather and climate, and the satellite record is now long enough to provide a thirty-year baseline period.

== See also ==
- Polar amplification
- Polar vortex
