= CICE =

CICE may refer to:

- a callsign for TVO in Ontario, Canada
- CICE (sea ice model)
- Crédit d'impôt pour la compétitivité et l'emploi, a tax exemption towards French businesses
