= ICESat-2 =

NASA Earth observation satellite

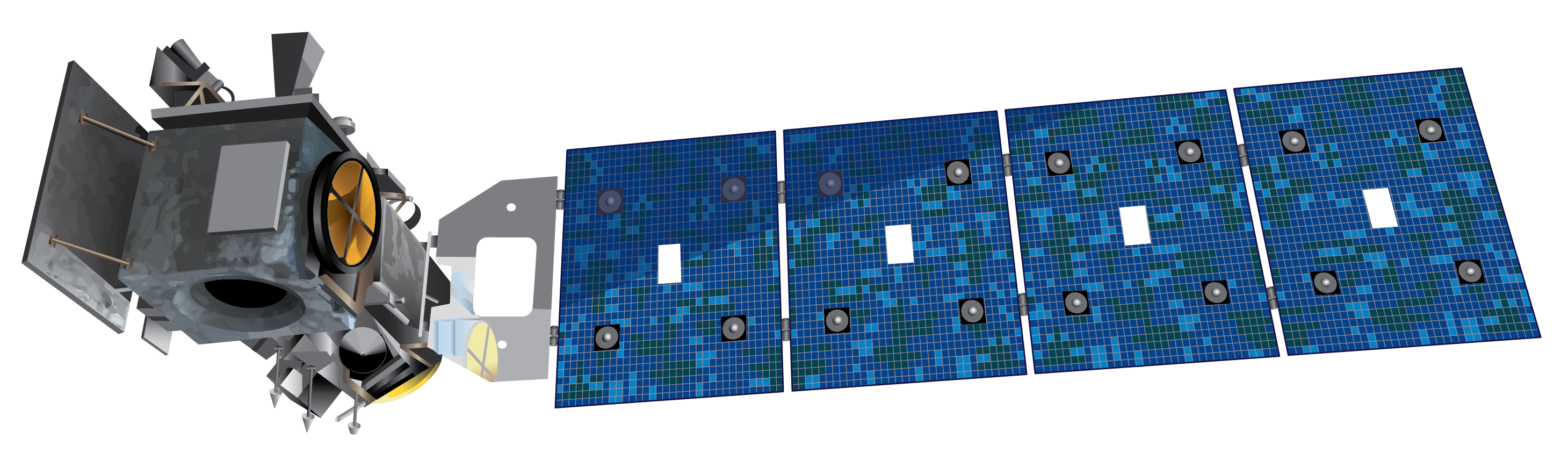
- Artist's impression of ICESat-2 in orbit
- Mission type: Remote sensing
- Operator: NASA
- COSPAR ID: 2018-070A
- SATCAT no.: 43613
- Website: icesat-2.gsfc.nasa.gov
- Mission duration: Planned: 3 years Elapsed: 7 years, 9 months, 2 days

Spacecraft properties
- Bus: LEOStar-3
- Manufacturer: Orbital Sciences/Orbital ATK
- Launch mass: 1,514 kg (3,338 lb)
- Payload mass: 298 kg (657 lb)
- Dimensions: At launch: 2.5 × 1.9 × 3.8 m (8.2 × 6.2 × 12.5 ft)
- Power: 1200 W

Start of mission
- Launch date: 15 September 2018, 13:02 UTC
- Rocket: Delta II 7420-10C
- Launch site: Vandenberg SLC-2W
- Contractor: United Launch Alliance

Orbital parameters
- Reference system: Geocentric
- Regime: Low Earth
- Semi-major axis: 6,859.07 km (4,262.03 mi)
- Eccentricity: 0.0002684
- Perigee altitude: 479.10 km (297.70 mi)
- Apogee altitude: 482.78 km (299.99 mi)
- Inclination: 92.0002°
- Period: 94.22 minutes
- Velocity: 6.9 km/s (4.3 mi/s)
- Epoch: 8 March 2019, 15:04:15 UTC
Instruments
- ATLAS: Advanced Topographic Laser Altimeter System
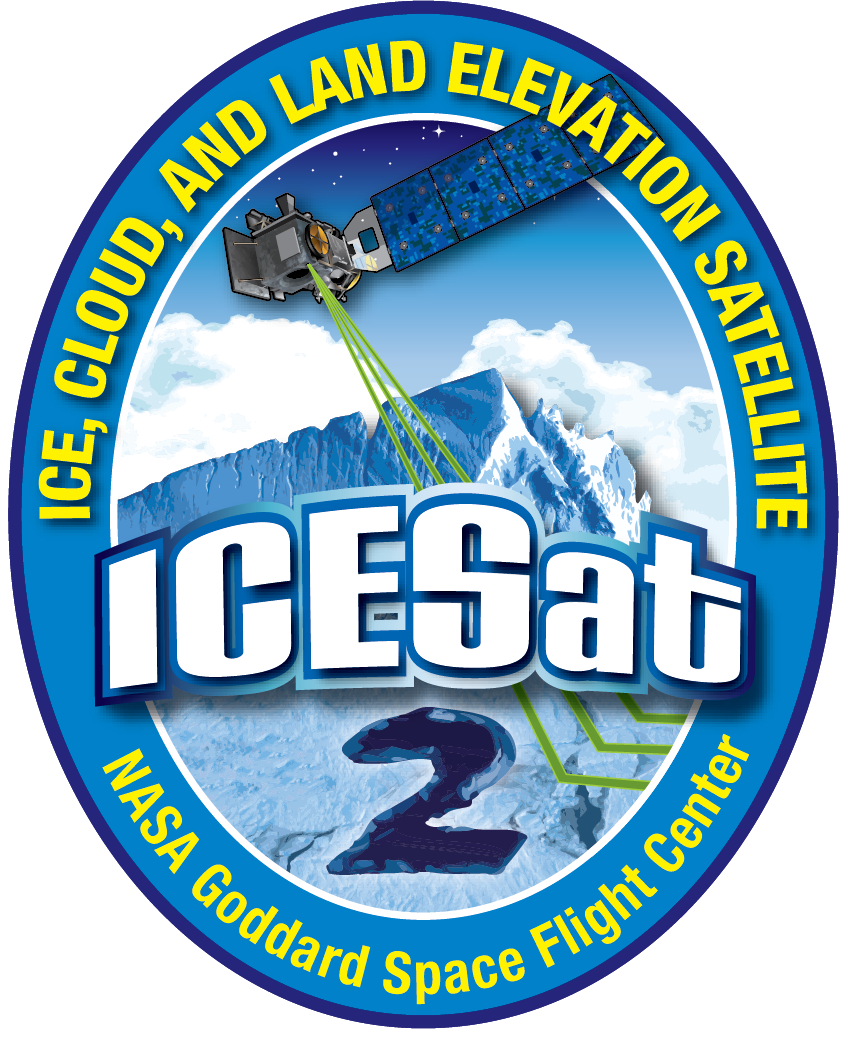

ICESat-2 (Ice, Cloud, and land Elevation Satellite 2), part of NASA's Earth Observing System, is a satellite mission for measuring ice sheet elevation and sea ice thickness, as well as land topography, vegetation characteristics, and clouds. ICESat-2, a follow-on to the ICESat mission, was launched on 15 September 2018 onboard Delta II as the final flight from Vandenberg Air Force Base in California, into a near-circular, near-polar orbit with an altitude of approximately 496 km (308 mi). It was designed to operate for three years and carry enough propellant for seven years. The satellite orbits Earth at a speed of 6.9 kilometers per second (4.3 mi/s).

The ICESat-2 mission was designed to provide elevation data needed to determine ice sheet mass balance as well as vegetation canopy information. For over six years, it has delivered precise topographic data across ice sheets, oceans, land, lakes, reservoirs and cities worldwide, in addition to focused polar coverage. ICESat-2 also has the ability to detect seafloor topography up to 100 feet (30m) below the surface in clear watered coastal areas. Because the great changes of polar ice cover in global warming are not quantified, one of the main purposes of ICESat-2 is measuring the changing of the elevation of ice sheets by its laser system and lidar to quantify the influence of melting ice sheet in sea-level raising. Additionally, the high accuracy of multiple pulses allows collecting measurement of the heights of sea ice to analyze its change rate during the time.

The ICESat-2 spacecraft was built and tested by Northrop Grumman Innovation Systems in Gilbert, Arizona, while the on board instrument, ATLAS, was built and managed by Goddard Space Flight Center in Greenbelt, Maryland. The ATLAS instrument was designed and built by the center, and the bus was built by and integrated with the instrument by Orbital Sciences (later Orbital ATK). The satellite was launched on a Delta II rocket provided by United Launch Alliance. This was the last launch of the Delta II rocket, and the last launch of a rocket derived from the PGM-17 Thor missile.

== Satellite instruments ==
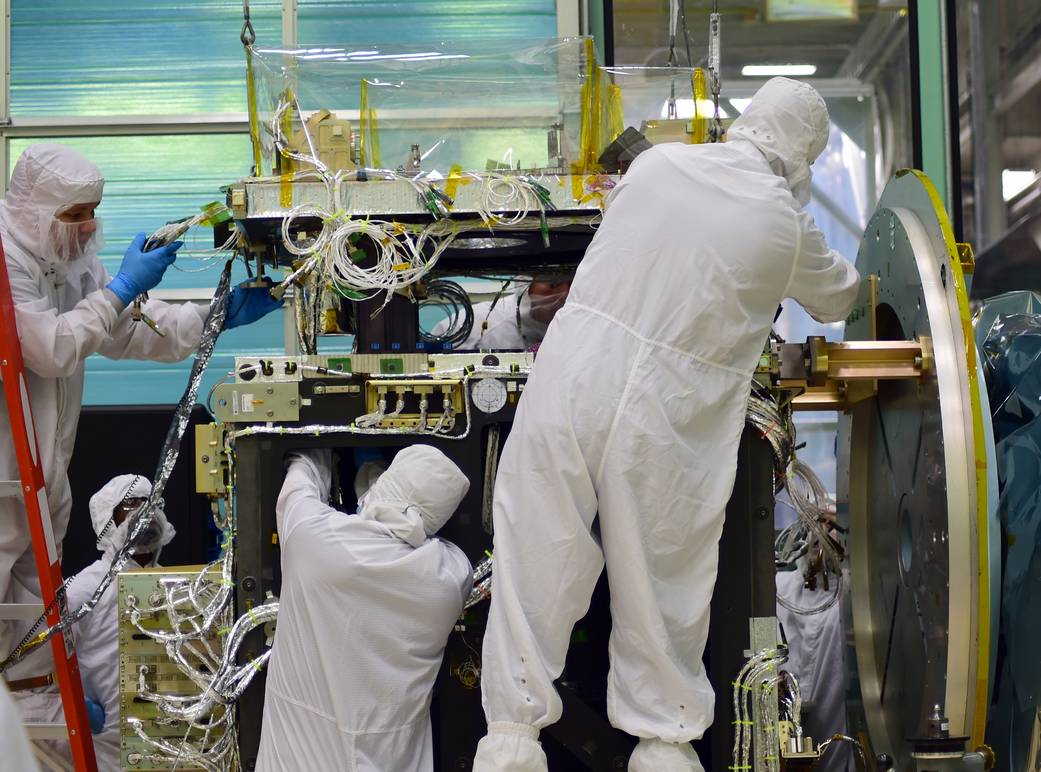
ATLAS instrument assembly at NASA GSFC

The sole instrument on ICESat-2 is the Advanced Topographic Laser Altimeter System (ATLAS), a space-based lidar. It was designed and built at Goddard Space Flight Center, with the laser generation and detection systems provided by Fibertek. ATLAS measures the travel time of laser photons from the satellite to Earth and back; computer programs use the travel time from multiple pulses to determine elevation.

ATLAS emits visible laser pulses at 532 nm wavelength (Green). As ICESat-2 orbits, ATLAS generates six beams arranged in three pairs in order to better determine the surface's slope and provide more ground coverage. Its predecessor, ICESat, had only one laser beam. The greater number of lasers allows for improved coverage of Earth's surface. Each beam pair is 3.3 km (2.1 mi) apart across the beam track, and each beam in a pair is separated by 2.5 km (1.6 mi) along the beam track. The laser array is rotated 2 degrees from the satellite's ground track so that a beam pair track is separated by about 90 m (300 ft). The laser pulse rate combined with satellite speed results in ATLAS taking an elevation measurement every 70 cm (28 in) along the satellite's ground path.

The laser fires at a rate of 10 kHz. Each pulse sends out about 20 trillion photons, almost all of which are dispersed or deflected as the pulse travels to Earth's surface and bounces back to the satellite. About a dozen photons from each pulse return to the instrument and are collected with a 79 cm (2.6 ft) beryllium telescope. Beryllium has high specific strength and holds its shape across a large range of temperatures. The telescope collects photons with wavelength of 532 nm, thus filters out irrelevant light in the atmosphere. Computer programs further identify 532 nm photons in the dataset; only reflected photons of the laser are kept for analysis.

A notable attribute of ATLAS is that engineers enabled the satellite to control how it is positioned in space, which is relevant because ATLAS records the distance from itself to the ground, and if its position is off, the measurement recorded for Earth's elevation will be off as well. Engineers also constructed the laser reference system, which confirms that the laser is adjusted in accordance to the telescope. If either the telescope or the laser is off, the satellite can make its own adjustments accordingly.

The National Snow and Ice Data Center Distributed Active Archive Center manages ICESat-2 science data.

== Mission science ==
ICESat-2 has four science objectives:

1. Quantify polar ice sheet contributions to current and recent sea-level change and the linkages to climate conditions;
2. Quantify regional signatures of ice-sheet changes to assess the mechanisms driving those changes and improve predictive ice sheet models; this includes quantifying the regional evolution of ice sheet changes, such as how changes at outlet glacier termini propagate inward;
3. Estimate sea-ice thickness to examine ice/ocean/atmosphere exchanges of energy, mass and moisture;
4. Measure vegetation canopy height as a basis for estimating large-scale biomass and biomass change. For this mission, the data of heights of vegetation canopy are highly accurate by using the multibeam system and micropulse lidar (photon-counting) technology in Advanced Topographic Laser Altimeter System (ATLAS).

In addition, ICESat-2 will take measurements of clouds and aerosols, the height of oceans, inland water bodies like reservoirs and lakes, cities, and ground movements after events like earthquakes or landslides.

== Project development ==
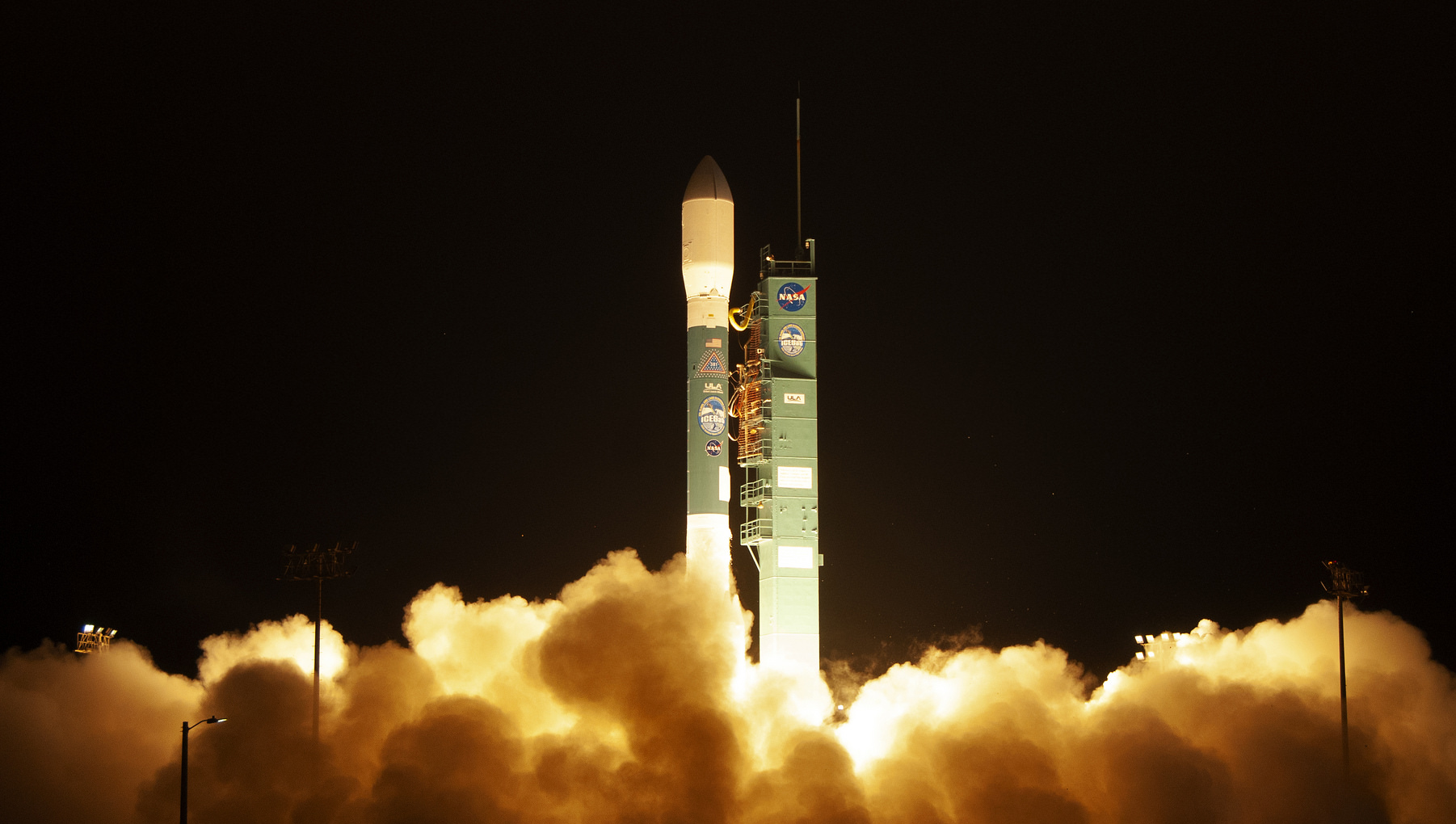
Launch of ICESat-2

ICESat-2 is a follow-up to the original ICESat mission, which was decommissioned in 2010. When the project entered its first phase in 2010, it was expected to be ready for launch as soon as 2015. In December 2012, NASA reported that they expected the project to launch in 2016. In the following years, technical issues with the mission's only onboard instrument, ATLAS, delayed the mission further, pushing the expected launch back from late 2016 to May 2017. In July 2014, NASA submitted a report to Congress detailing the reasons for the delay and a projected budget overrun, as is required by law for NASA projects which spend at least 15% over budget. In order to finance the budget overrun, NASA diverted funds from other planned satellite missions, such as the Plankton, Aerosol, Cloud, ocean Ecosystem (PACE) satellite.

The launch of ICESat-2 took place on 15 September 2018 at 13:02 UTC from Vandenberg Air Force Base Space Launch Complex 2 aboard a Delta II 7420-10C. To maintain a degree of data continuity between the decommissioning of ICESat and the launch of ICESat-2, NASA's airborne Operation IceBridge used a variety of aircraft to collect polar topography and measure ice thickness using suites of laser altimeters, radars, and other systems.

== Applications ==
ICESat-2's Applications program is designed to engage people and organizations who plan to use the data, before the satellite launches. Selected from a pool of applicants, this Science Definition Team represents experts in a wide variety of scientific fields including hydrology, atmospheric science, oceanography, and vegetation science. Early Adopters in the program, including ice scientists, ecologists, and the Navy, work with the ICESat-2 applications team to provide information on how the satellite observations can be used. The goal of this group is to communicate the vast capabilities of the ICESat-2 mission with the greater scientific community, with the aim to diversify and innovate new methods and techniques from the collected data. For example, scientists in the ecology field will be able to use the measurement of vegetation height, biomass, and canopy cover derived from ICESat-2's photon counting lidar (PCL).

In the spring of 2020, NASA selected the ICESat-2 Science Team through a competitive application process, to replace the pre-launch Science Definition Team. This group acts as an advisory board to the mission post-launch, in an effort to ensure the mission science requirements are met.

== See also ==
- CryoSat – European Space Agency (ESA) equivalent to Operation IceBridge and ICESat
- CryoSat-2 – Follow-on mission to CryoSat
