= SIPEX =

SIPEX may refer to:

- Sea Ice Physics and Ecosystem eXperiment
- Sixth International Philatelic Exhibition held in Washington, D.C.
