= Freeboard (nautical) =

Distance from the waterline to the upper deck level of a ship

A graphical representation of the dimensions used to describe a ship. f is the freeboard.

In sailing and boating, a vessel's freeboard is the distance from the waterline to the upper deck level, measured at the lowest point of sheer where water can enter the boat or ship. In commercial vessels, the latter criterion measured relative to the ship's load line, regardless of deck arrangements, is the mandated and regulated meaning.

In yachts, a low freeboard is often found on racing boats, for increased speed (by reducing weight and therefore drag). A higher freeboard will give more room in the cabin, but will increase weight and drag, compromising speed. A higher freeboard, such as used on ocean liners, also helps weather waves and so reduce the likelihood of being washed over by full water waves. A low-freeboard vessel is susceptible to taking in water in rough seas. Freighter ships and warships use high freeboard designs to increase internal volume, which also allows them to satisfy International Maritime Organization (IMO) damage stability regulations, due to increased reserve buoyancy.

== See also ==
- Gunwale
- For the term as used in measuring sea ice, see Sea ice thickness.
