= Arctic ice pack =

Sea-ice cover of the Arctic Ocean and its vicinity

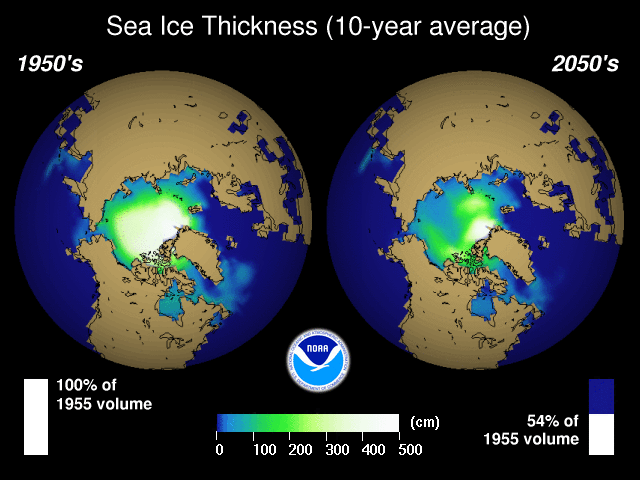
NOAA projected Arctic changes

Variation of Arctic sea ice from 1984 to 2019. Younger ice (first-year ice) is shown in darker shades, while older ice (four-year or older) is shown in white.

This visual shows the Arctic sea ice change and the corresponding absorbed solar radiation change during June, July, and August from 2000 through 2014.

The Arctic ice pack is the sea ice cover of the Arctic Ocean and its vicinity. The Arctic ice pack undergoes a regular seasonal cycle in which ice melts in spring and summer, reaches a minimum around mid-September, then increases during autumn and winter. Summer ice cover in the Arctic is about 50% of winter cover. Some of the ice survives from one year to the next. Currently, 28% of Arctic basin sea ice is multi-year ice, thicker than seasonal ice: up to 3–4 m (9.8–13.1 ft) thick over large areas, with ridges up to 20 m (65.6 ft) thick. Besides the regular seasonal cycle there has been an underlying trend of declining sea ice in the Arctic in recent decades as well.

== Climatic importance ==
=== Energy balance effects ===
Sea ice has an important effect on the heat balance of the polar oceans, since it insulates the (relatively) warm ocean from the much colder air above, thus reducing heat loss from the oceans. Sea ice is highly reflective of solar radiation, reflecting about 60% of incoming solar radiation when bare and about 80% when covered with snow. This is due to a feedback known as the albedo effect. This is much greater than the reflectivity of the sea (about 10%) and thus the ice also affects the absorption of sunlight at the surface.

=== Hydrological effects ===
The sea ice cycle is also an important source of dense (saline) "bottom water." When sea water freezes it leaves most of its salt content behind. The remaining surface water, made dense by the extra salinity, sinks and produces dense water masses such as North Atlantic Deep Water. This production of dense water is essential in maintaining the thermohaline circulation, and the accurate representation of these processes is important in climate modelling.

=== Odden ===
In the Arctic, a key area where pancake ice forms the dominant ice type over an entire region is the so-called Odden ice tongue in the Greenland Sea. The Odden (the word is Norwegian for the headland) grows eastward from the main East Greenland ice edge in the vicinity of 72–74°N during the winter because of the presence of very cold polar surface water in the Jan Mayen Current, which diverts some water eastward from the East Greenland Current at that latitude. Most of the old ice continues south, driven by the wind, so a cold open water surface is exposed on which new ice forms as frazil and pancake in the rough seas.

== Extent and volume of sea ice and their trends ==
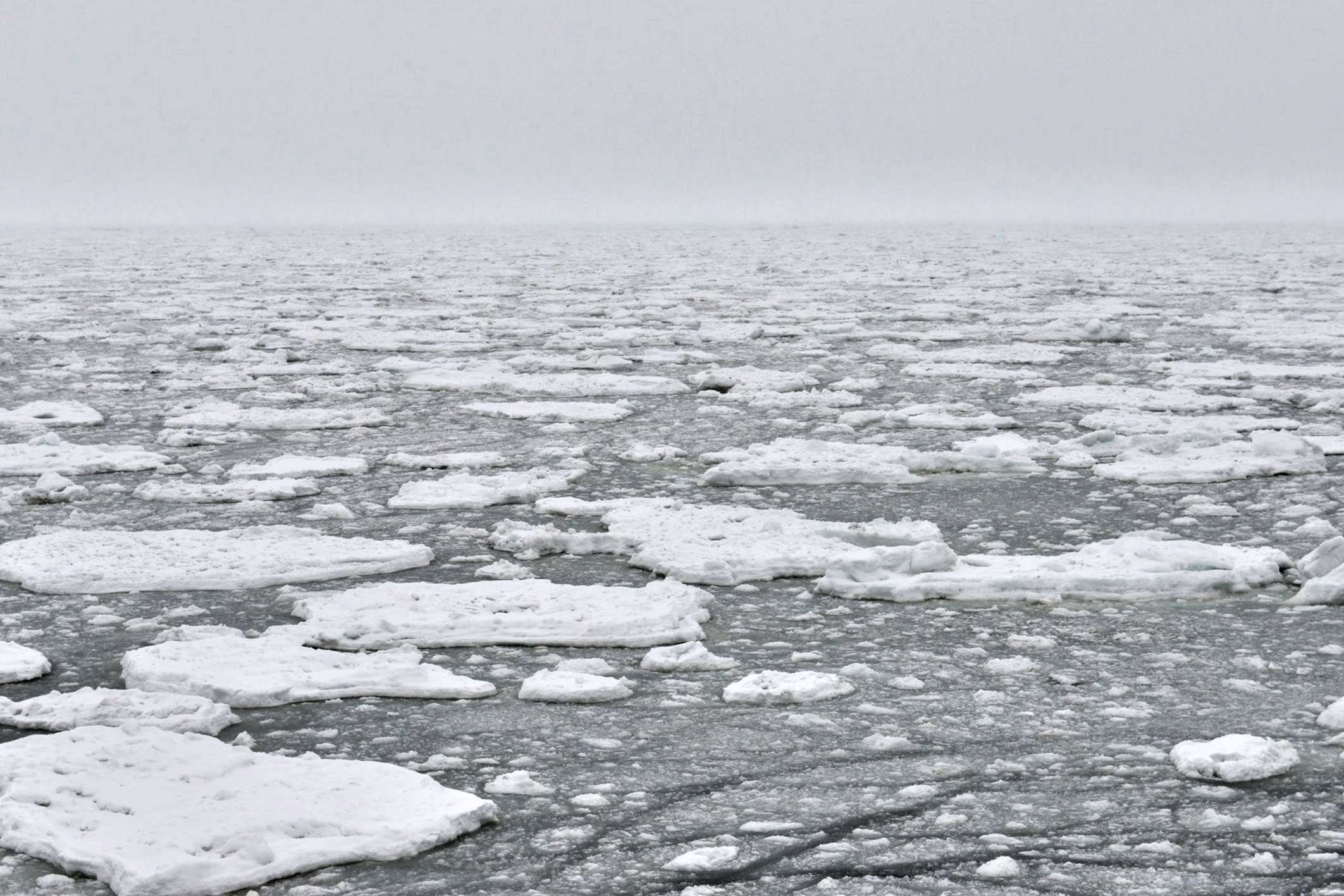
Photo from MS Hanseatic, 27 August 2014: Polar ice limit (Record position 85°40.7818′ N, 135°38.8735′ E)

In this animation, the Earth rotates slowly as the Arctic sea ice advances over time from 21 March 2014 to 3 August 2014.

Extent of Arctic ice

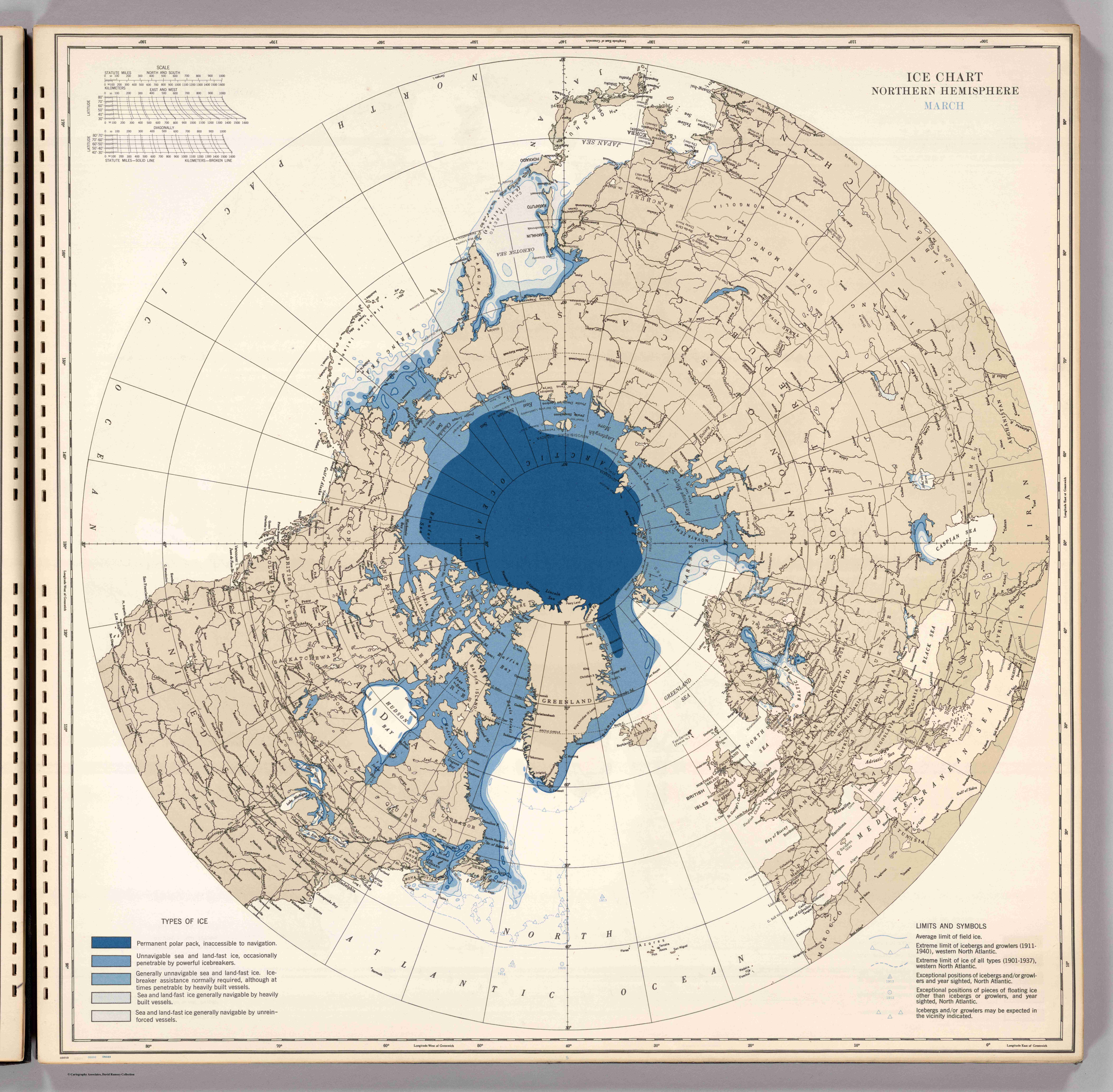
Extent of Arctic ice, March 1946 (U.S. Navy)

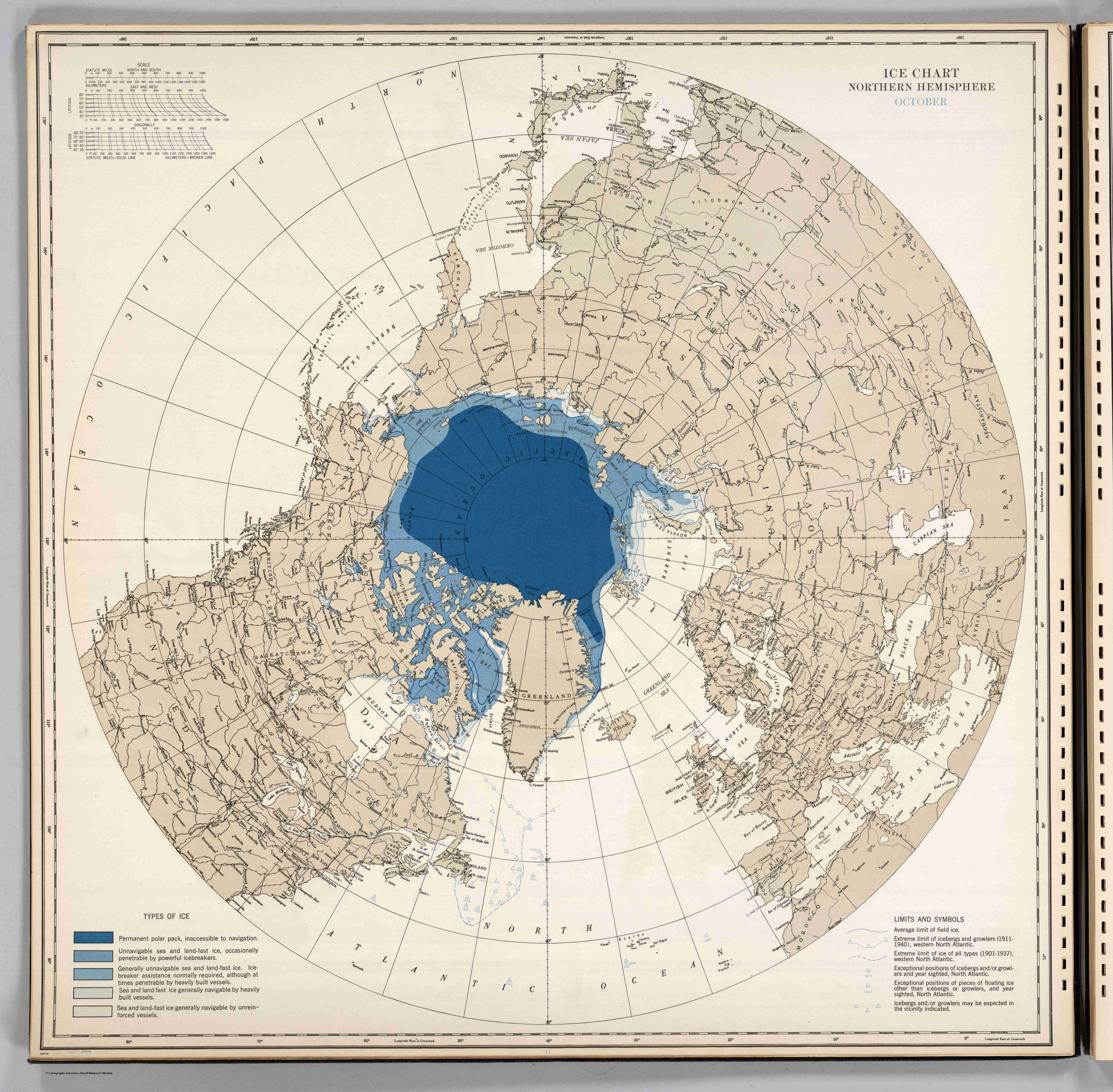
Extent of Arctic ice, October 1946 (U.S. Navy)

David Rumsey Map Collection

Records of Arctic Sea ice from the United Kingdom's Hadley Centre for Climate Prediction and Research go back to the turn of the 20th century, although the quality of the data before 1950 is debatable. Reliable measurements of sea ice edge begin within the satellite era. From the late 1970s, the Scanning Multichannel Microwave Radiometer (SMMR) on Seasat (1978) and Nimbus 7 (1978–87) satellites provided information that was independent of solar illumination or meteorological conditions. The frequency and accuracy of passive microwave measurements improved with the launch of the DMSP F8 Special Sensor Microwave/Imager (SSMI) in 1987. Both the sea ice area and extent are estimated, with the latter being larger, as it is defined as the area of ocean with at least 15% sea ice.

A modeling study of the 52-year period from 1947 to 1999 found a statistically significant trend in Arctic ice volume of −3% per decade; splitting this into wind-forced and temperature forced components shows it to be essentially all caused by the temperature forcing. A computer-based, time-resolved calculation of sea ice volume, fitted to various measurements, revealed that monitoring the ice volume is much more significant for evaluating sea ice loss than pure area considerations.

The ice extent trends from 1979 to 2002, have been a statistically significant Arctic sea ice decrease of −2.5% ± 0.9% per decade during those 23 years. Climate models simulated this trend in 2002. The September minimum ice extent trend for 1979–2011 declined by 12.0% per decade during 32 years. In 2007, the minimum extent fell by more than a million square kilometers, the biggest decline since accurate satellite data has been available, to 4,140,000 km^{2} (1,600,000 sq mi). New research shows the Arctic Sea ice to be melting faster than predicted by any of the 18 computer models used by the Intergovernmental Panel on Climate Change in preparing its 2007 assessments. In 2012, a new record low of about 3,500,000 km^{2} (1,400,000 sq mi) was reached.

In the overall mass balance, the volume of sea ice depends on the thickness of the ice as well as the areal extent. While the satellite era has enabled better measurement of trends in areal extent, accurate ice thickness measurements remain a challenge. "Nonetheless, the extreme loss of this summer's sea ice cover and the slow onset of freeze-up portends lower than normal ice extent throughout autumn and winter, and the ice that grows back is likely to be fairly thin". As more and more of the sea ice is thinner first-year ice the greater effect storms have on its stability with turbulence resulting from major extratropical cyclones resulting in extensive fractures of sea ice.

Decade-by-decade progression of arctic sea ice melting shows continued ice loss since 1980, with the greatest percentage loss rate experienced in the late summer and early autumn.

The development of Arctic sea ice volume as determined by measurement corrected numerical simulation shows probability of total sea ice loss in summer for the near future.

The area of Arctic sea ice reached a minimum in September 2012, but recent years have shown less area than 2012 in other months. Late summer shows the greatest percentage loss.

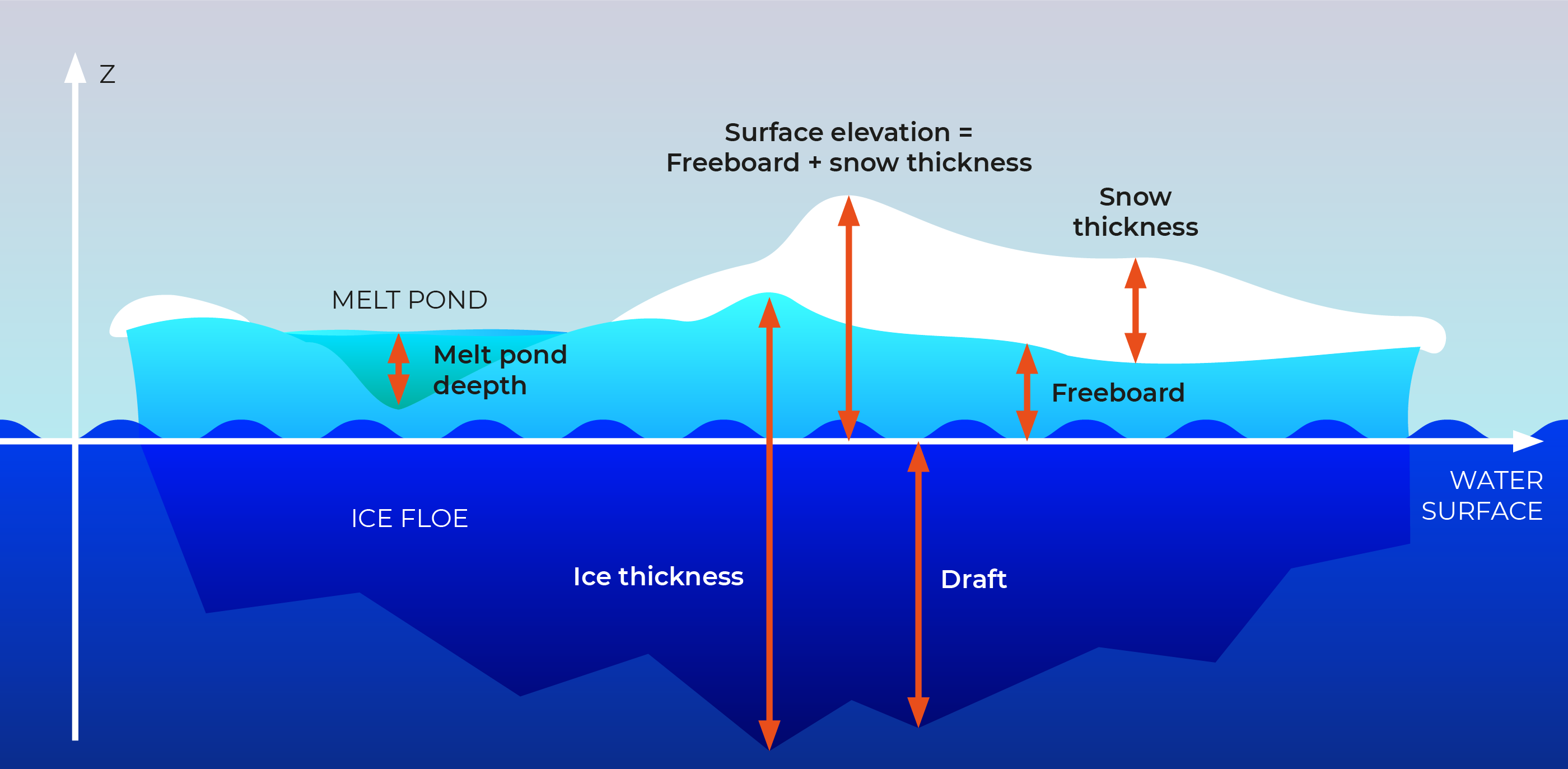
Scientific parameter to quantify the extent of sea ice
Sea Ice Extent over the Arctic (OSI SAF data). View source data.

== See also ==
- Arctic sea ice ecology and history
- Climate change
- Iceberg
- Polar ice cap
- Polynya
- Shelf ice
- Antarctic sea ice
