= Sea ice emissivity modelling =

With increased interest in sea ice and its effects on the global climate, efficient methods are required to monitor both its extent and exchange processes. Satellite-mounted, microwave radiometers, such SSMI, AMSR and AMSU, are an ideal tool for the task because they can see through cloud cover, and they have frequent, global coverage. A passive microwave instrument detects objects through emitted radiation since different substance have different emission spectra. To detect sea ice more efficiently, there is a need to model these emission processes. The interaction of sea ice with electromagnetic radiation in the microwave range is still not well understood. In general is collected information limited because of the large-scale variability due to the emissivity of sea ice.

== General ==
Satellite microwave data (and visible, infrared data depending on the conditions) collected from sensors assumes that ocean surface is a binary (ice covered or ice free) and observations are used to quantify the radiative flux. During the melt seasons in spring and summer, sea ice surface temperature goes above freezing. Thus, passive microwave measurements are able to detect rising brightness temperatures, as the emissivity increases to almost that of a blackbody, and as liquid starts to form around the ice crystals, but when melting continues, slush forms and then melt ponds and the brightness temperature goes down to that of ice free water. Because the emissivity of sea ice changes over time and often in short time spans, data and algorithms used to interpret findings are crucial.

== Effective permittivity ==
As established in the previous section, the most important quantity in radiative transfer calculations of sea ice is the relative permittivity. Sea ice is a complex composite composed of pure ice and included pockets of air and highly saline brine. The electro-magnetic properties of such a mixture will be different from, and normally somewhere in between (though not always—see, for instance, metamaterial), those of its constituents. Since it is not just the relative composition that is important, but also the geometry, the calculation of effective permittivities introduces a high level of uncertainty.

Vant et al. have performed actual measurements of sea ice relative permittivities at frequencies between 0.1 and 4.0 GHz which they have encapsulated in the following formula:

$\epsilon^* = a V_b + b$

where $\epsilon^*$ is the real or imaginary effective relative permittivity, V_{b} is the relative brine volume—see sea ice growth processes—and a and b are constants. This empirical model shows some agreement with dielectric mixture models based on Maxwell's equations in the low frequency limit, such as this formula from Sihvola and Kong

$\epsilon_{eff}=\epsilon_1+\frac{V_b \epsilon_1 (\epsilon_2-\epsilon_1)/ (\epsilon_1+ P(\epsilon_2-\epsilon1)}{1-P V_b(\epsilon_2-\epsilon_1)/ \left [\epsilon_1+P (\epsilon_2-\epsilon_1) \right ]}$

where $\epsilon_1$ is the relative permittivity of the background material (pure ice), $\epsilon_2$ is the relative permittivity of the inclusion material (brine) and P is a depolarization factor based on the geometry of the brine inclusions. Brine inclusions are frequently modelled as vertically oriented needles for which the depolarization factor is P=0.5 in the vertical direction and P=0. in the horizontal. The two formulas, while they correlate strongly, disagree in both relative and absolute magnitudes.

Pure ice is an almost perfect dielectric with a real permittivity of roughly 3.15 in the microwave range which is fairly independent of frequency while the imaginary component is negligible, especially in comparison with the brine which is extremely lossy. Meanwhile, the permittivity of the brine, which has both a large real part and a large imaginary part, is normally calculated with a complex formula based on Debye relaxation curves.

== Electromagnetic properties of ice ==
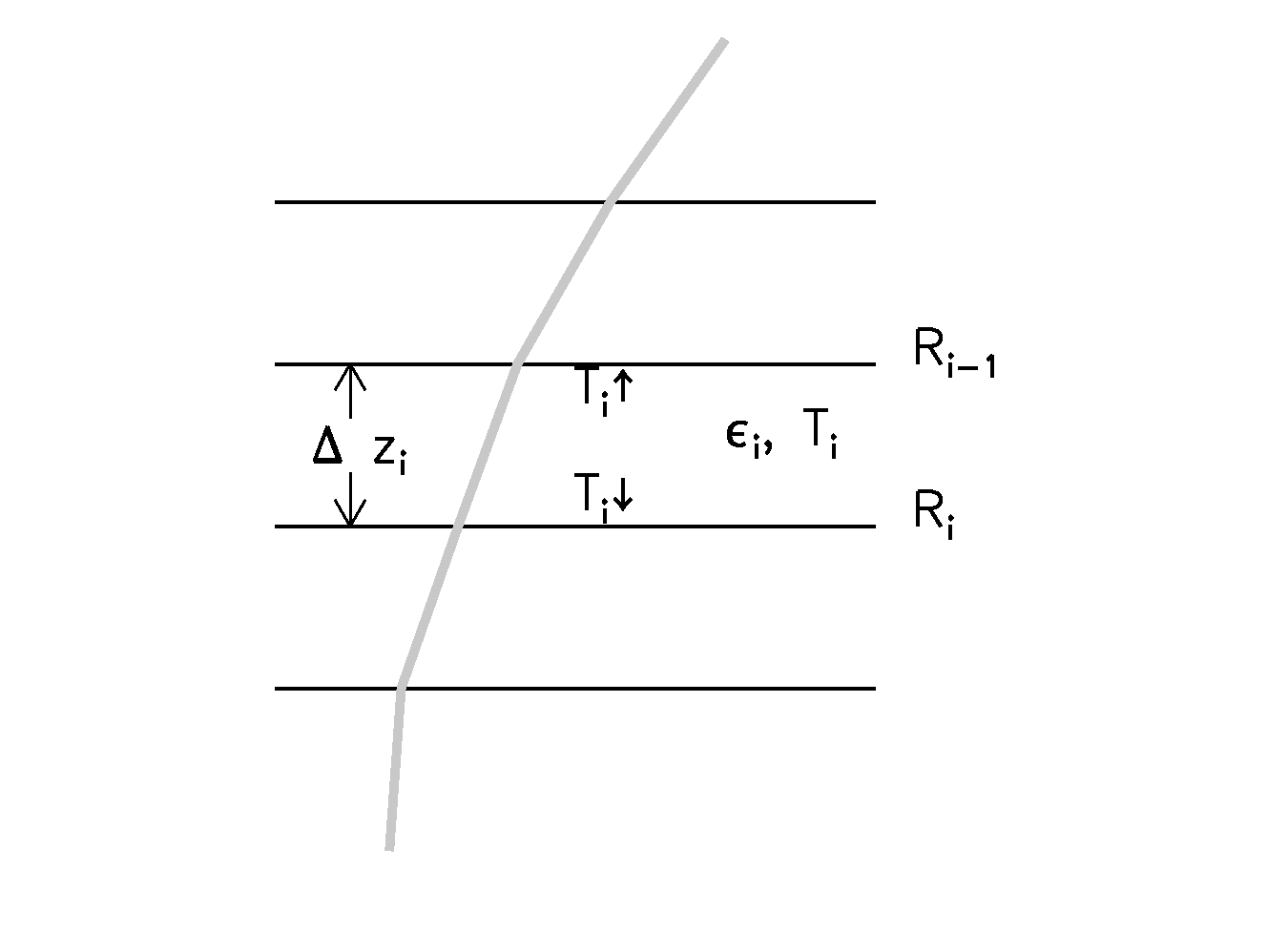
Diagram illustrating radiative transfer in a discontinuous medium, such as sea ice.

When scattering is neglected, sea ice emissivity can be modelled through radiative transfer. The diagram to the right shows a ray passing through an ice sheet with several layers. These layers represent the air above the ice, the snow layer (if applicable), ice with different electro-magnetic properties and the water below the ice. Interfaces between the layers may be continuous (in the case of ice with varying salt content along the vertical axis, but formed in the same way and in the same time period), in which case the reflection coefficients, R_{i} will be zero, or discontinuous (in the case of the ice-snow interface), in which case reflection coefficients must be calculated—see below. Each layer is characterized by its physical properties: temperature, T_{i}, complex permittivity, $\epsilon_i$ and thickness, $\Delta z_i$, and will have an upwards component of the radiation, $T_i \uparrow$, and a downwards component, $T_i \downarrow$, passing through it. Since we assume plane-parallel geometry, all reflected rays will be at the same angle and we need only account for radiation along a single line-of-sight.

Summing the contributions from each layer generates the following sparse system of linear equations:

$$T_i \uparrow - \tau_i (1-R_i) T_{i+1} \uparrow - \tau_i R_i T_i \downarrow
= (1 - \tau_i) T_i$$
$$T_i \downarrow - \tau_i (1-R_{i-1}) T_{i-1} \downarrow - \tau_i R_{i-1} T_i \uparrow
= (1 - \tau_i) T_i$$

where R_{i} is the ith reflection coefficient, calculated via the Fresnel equations and $\tau_i$ is the ith transmission coefficient:

$$\tau_i = \exp \left (- \frac{\alpha_i \, \Delta z_i}{\cos \theta_i} \right )$$

where $\theta_i$ is the transmission angle in the ith layer, from Snell's law, $\Delta z_i$ is the layer thickness and $\alpha_i$ is the attenuation coefficient:

$$\alpha_i = \frac{4 \pi \nu}{c} \mathrm{Imag}\, n_i$$

where $\nu$ is the frequency and c is the speed of light—see Beer's law. The most important quantity in this calculation, and also the most difficult to establish with any certainty, is the complex refractive index, n_{i}. Since sea ice is non-magnetic, it can be calculated from relative permittivity alone:

$n_i=\sqrt{\epsilon_i}$

== Scattering ==
Emissivity calculations based strictly on radiative transfer tend to underestimate the brightness temperatures of sea ice, especially in the higher frequencies, because both included brine and air pockets within the ice will tend to scatter the radiation. Indeed, as ice becomes more opaque with higher frequency, radiative transfer becomes less important while scattering processes begin to dominate. Scattering in sea ice is frequently modelled with a Born approximation such as in strong fluctuation theory.

Scattering coefficients calculated at each layer must also be vertically integrated. The Microwave Emission Model of Layered Snowpack (MEMLS) uses a six-flux radiative transfer model to integrate both the scattering coefficients and the effective permittivities with scattering coefficients calculated either empirically or with a distorted Born approximation.

Scattering processes in sea ice are relatively poorly understood and scattering models poorly validated empirically.

== Other factors ==
There are many other factors not accounted for in the models described above. Mills and Heygster, for instance, show that sea ice ridging may have a significant effect on the signal. In such case, the ice can no longer be modelled using plane-parallel geometry. In addition to ridging, surface scattering from smaller-scale roughness must also be considered.

Since the microstructural properties of sea ice tend to be anisotropic, permittivity is ideally modelled as a tensor. This anisotropy will also affect the signal in the higher Stokes components, relevant for polarimetric radiometers such as WINDSAT. Both a sloping ice surface, as in the case of ridging—see polarization mixing, as well as scattering, especially from non-symmetric scatterers, will cause a transfer of intensity between the different Stokes components—see vector radiative transfer.

== See also ==
- Arctic sea ice decline
- Metamaterial
- Sea ice growth processes
- Sea ice concentration
- Sea ice thickness
