= International Programme for Antarctic Buoys =

The International Programme for Antarctic Buoys (IPAB) is a component of the WCRP.

== Programme ==
It aims to establish and maintain a network of drifting buoys in the Antarctic sea-ice zone which monitor ice motion, pressure and temperature. This is to support research in the region related to global climate processes, provide real-time operational meteorological data for numerical weather forecast centres and establish a basis for on-going monitoring of atmospheric and oceanic climate in the Antarctic sea-ice zone. IPAB was established in June 1994. The operational area of the Programme is south of 55 degrees south latitude, and includes that region of the Southern Ocean and Antarctic marginal seas within the maximum seasonal sea-ice extent.
