= Sea ice growth processes =

Sea ice is a complex composite composed primarily of pure ice in various states of crystallization, but including air bubbles and pockets of brine. Understanding its growth processes is important for climate modellers and remote sensing specialists, since the composition and microstructural properties of the ice affect how it reflects or absorbs sunlight.

A thin section of sea ice seen through cross-polarized light. All crystals (they have different interference colors) contain inclusions of brine (saline solution) and air - these lie within the (0001) crystallographic plane.

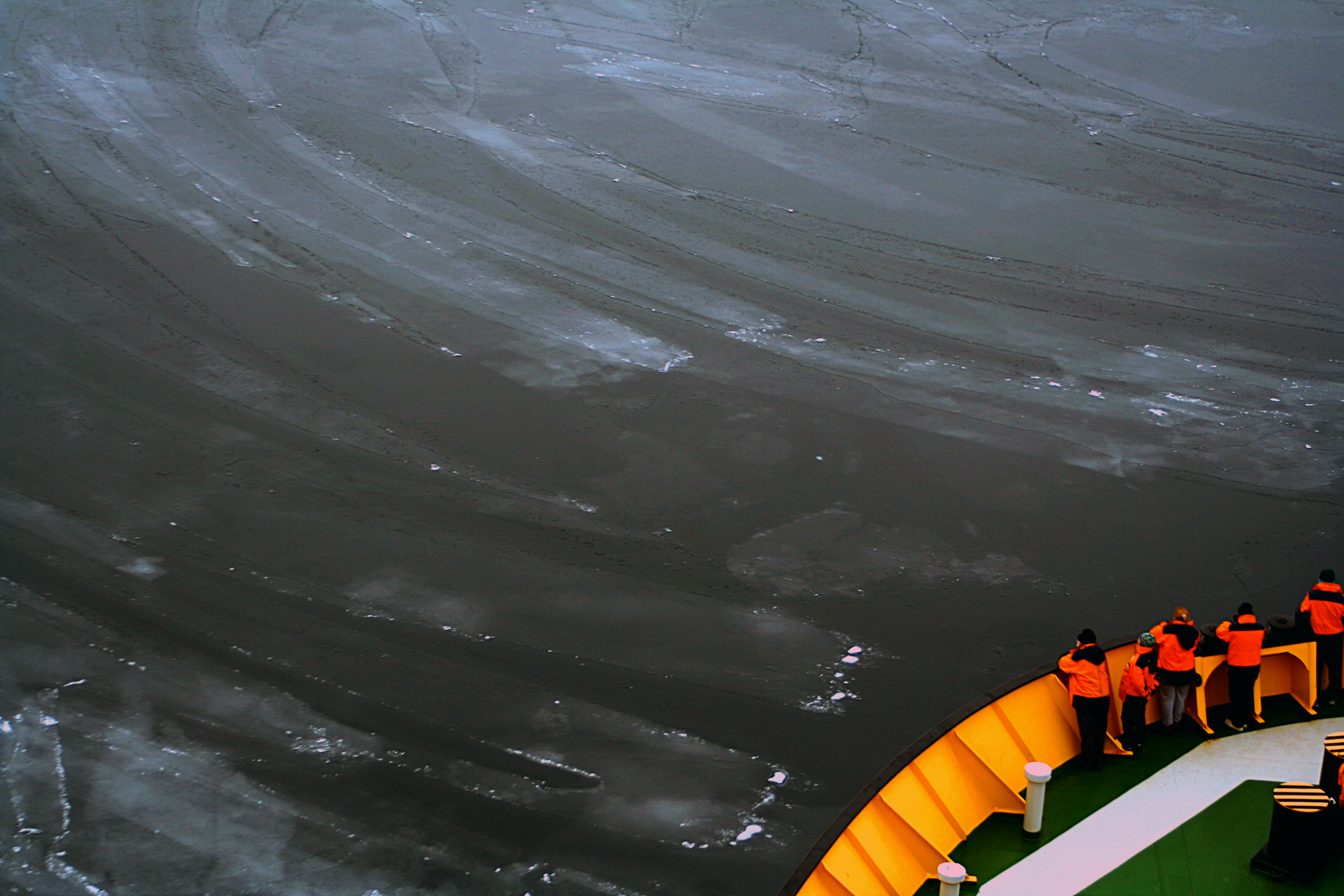
Nilas Ice formation at sea.

Sea ice growth models for predicting the ice distribution and extent are also valuable for shipping. An ice growth model can be combined with remote sensing measurements in an assimilation model as a means of generating more accurate ice charts.

== Overview ==
Several formation mechanisms of sea ice have been identified. At its earliest stages, sea ice consists of elongated, randomly oriented crystals. This is called frazil, and mixed with water in the unconsolidated state is known as grease ice. If wave and wind conditions are calm these crystals will consolidate at the surface, and by selective pressure begin to grow preferentially in the downward direction, forming nilas. In more turbulent conditions, the frazil will consolidate by mechanical action to form pancake ice, which has a more random structure. Another common formation mechanism, especially in the Antarctic where precipitation over sea ice is high, is from snow deposition: on thin ice the snow will weigh down the ice enough to cause flooding. Subsequent freezing will form ice with a much more granular structure.

One of the more interesting processes to occur within consolidated ice packs is changes in the saline content. As the ice freezes, most of the salt content gets rejected and forms highly saline brine inclusions between the crystals. With decreasing temperatures in the ice sheet, the size of the brine pockets decreases while the salt content goes up. Since ice is less dense than water, increasing pressure causes some of the brine to be ejected from both the top and bottom, producing the characteristic C-shaped salinity profile of first-year ice. Brine will also drain through vertical channels, particularly in the melt season. Thus multi-year ice will tend to have both lower salinity and lower density than first-year ice. Sea-ice density is relatively stable during winter with values close to 910 kg/m^{3}, but may decrease up to 720 kg/m^{3} during warming mainly due to increase in air volume. Air volume of sea ice in can be as high as 15% in summer and 4% in late autumn.

The main physical processes of sea-ice desalination are gravity drainage and flushing of surface meltwater and melt ponds. During winter, desalination is governed mostly by gravity drainage, while flushing becomes important during summer. Gravity drainage can be triggered both by atmospheric heat and bottom melt from oceanic heat. A typical salinity of first-year ice by the end of winter season is 4–6, while typical salinities of multiyear ice is 2–3. Snowmelt, surface flooding, and the presence of under-ice meltwater may affect sea-ice salinity. During the melt season, the only process of ice growth is related to the formation of false bottoms.

== Vertical growth ==
The downward growth of consolidated ice under the assumption of zero heat flux from the ocean is determined by the rate of conductive heat flux, Q^{*}, at the ice-water interface. The ocean heat fluxes substantially vary spatially and temporally and strongly contribute to the summer sea ice melt and the absence of sea ice in some parts of the Arctic Ocean. If we also assume a linear temperature profile within ice and no effect from ice thermal inertia, we can determine latent heat flux Q^{*} by solving the following equation:

$$Q^* = k_i \frac{T_{si} - T_w}{h_i} = k_s \frac{T_{s} - T_{si}}{h_s}$$

where T_{si} is the snow-ice interface temperature, T_{s} is the air-snow interface temperature, h_{i} and h_{s} are the ice and snow thicknesses. The water temperature T_{w} is assumed to be at or near freezing (Stefan problem). We can approximate the ice and snow thermal conductivities k_{i} and k_{s}, as an average over the layers. The surface heat budget defines the snow surface temperature T_{s} and includes four atmospheric heat fluxes:

$$Q^* = Q_E \left [e(T_s) \right] + Q_H(T_s) + Q_{LW}(T_s^4) + Q_{SW}$$

which are latent, sensible, longwave and shortwave radiation fluxes, respectively. For a description of the approximate parameterizations, see determining surface flux under sea ice thickness. The equation can be solved using a numerical root-finding algorithm such as bisection: the functional dependencies on surface temperature are given, with e being the equilibrium vapor pressure. Shortwave radiation may increase ocean surface temperatures and corresponding ocean heat fluxes, affecting heat balance at the ice-ocean interface. This process is a part of Ice–albedo feedback.

While Cox and Weeks assume thermal equilibrium, Tonboe uses a more complex thermodynamic model based on numerical solution of the heat equation. This would be appropriate when the ice is thick or the weather conditions are changing rapidly.

The rate of ice growth can be calculated from heat flux by the following equation:

$$g=\frac{dh_i}{dt}=\frac{Q^*}{L \rho}$$

where L is the latent heat of fusion for water and $\rho$ is the density of ice (for pure ice). For sea ice, L is the effective latent heat of sea ice and $\rho$ is the density of sea ice. These two parameters depend on sea-ice salinity, temperature, and volumetric gas fraction, as well as sea-ice thermal conductivity. The growth rate of sea ice in turn determines the saline content of the newly frozen ice. Empirical equations for determining the initial brine entrapment in sea ice have been derived by Cox and Weeks and Nakawo and Sinha and take the form:

$$S=S_0 f(g)$$

where S is ice salinity, S_{0} is the salinity of the parent water, and f is an empirical function of ice growth rate, e.g.:

$$f(g) = \frac{0.12}{0.12+0.88 \exp(-4.2 \times 10^4 g)}$$

where g is in cm/s.

== Salt content ==
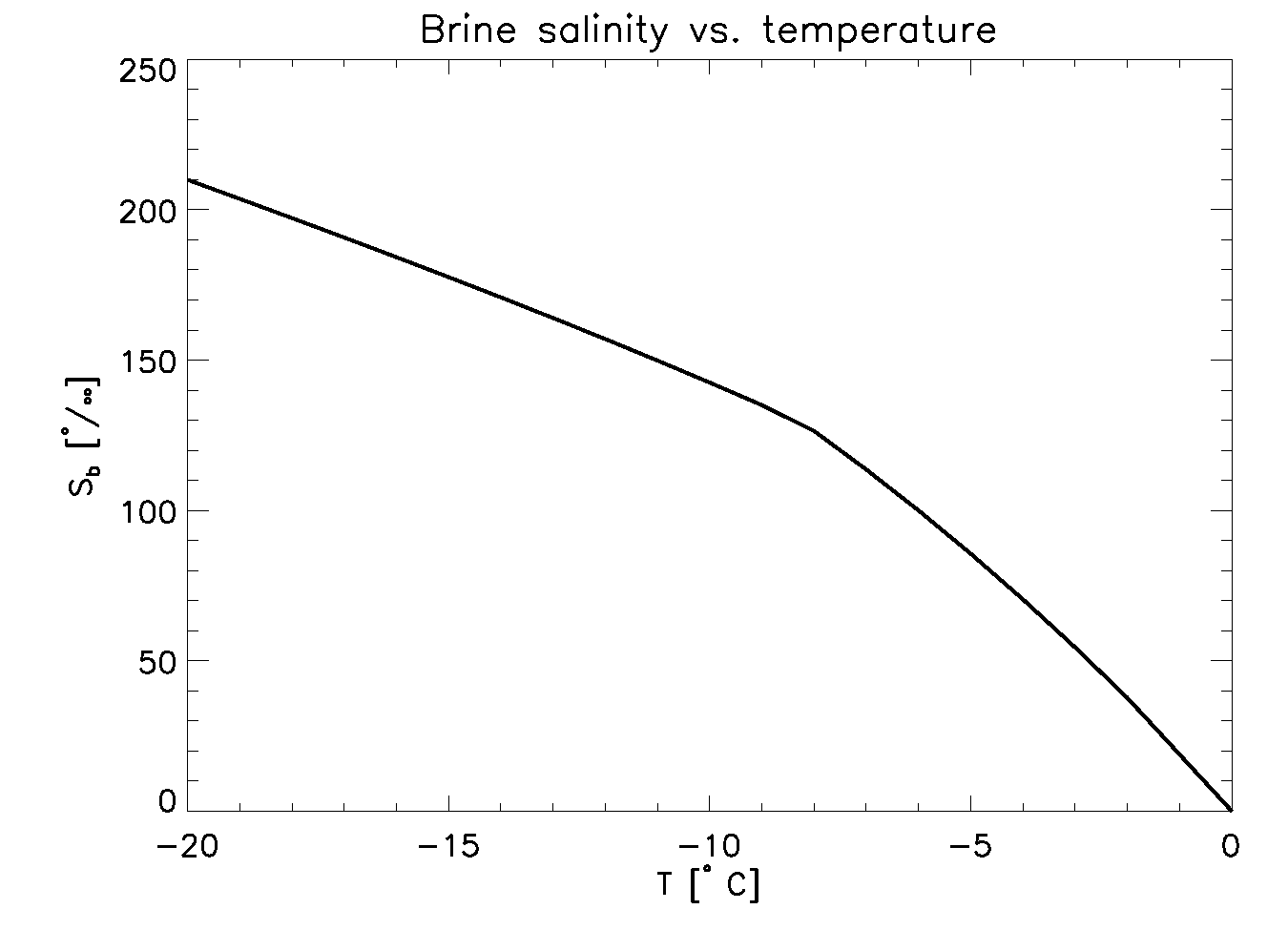
Brine salinity as a function of temperature

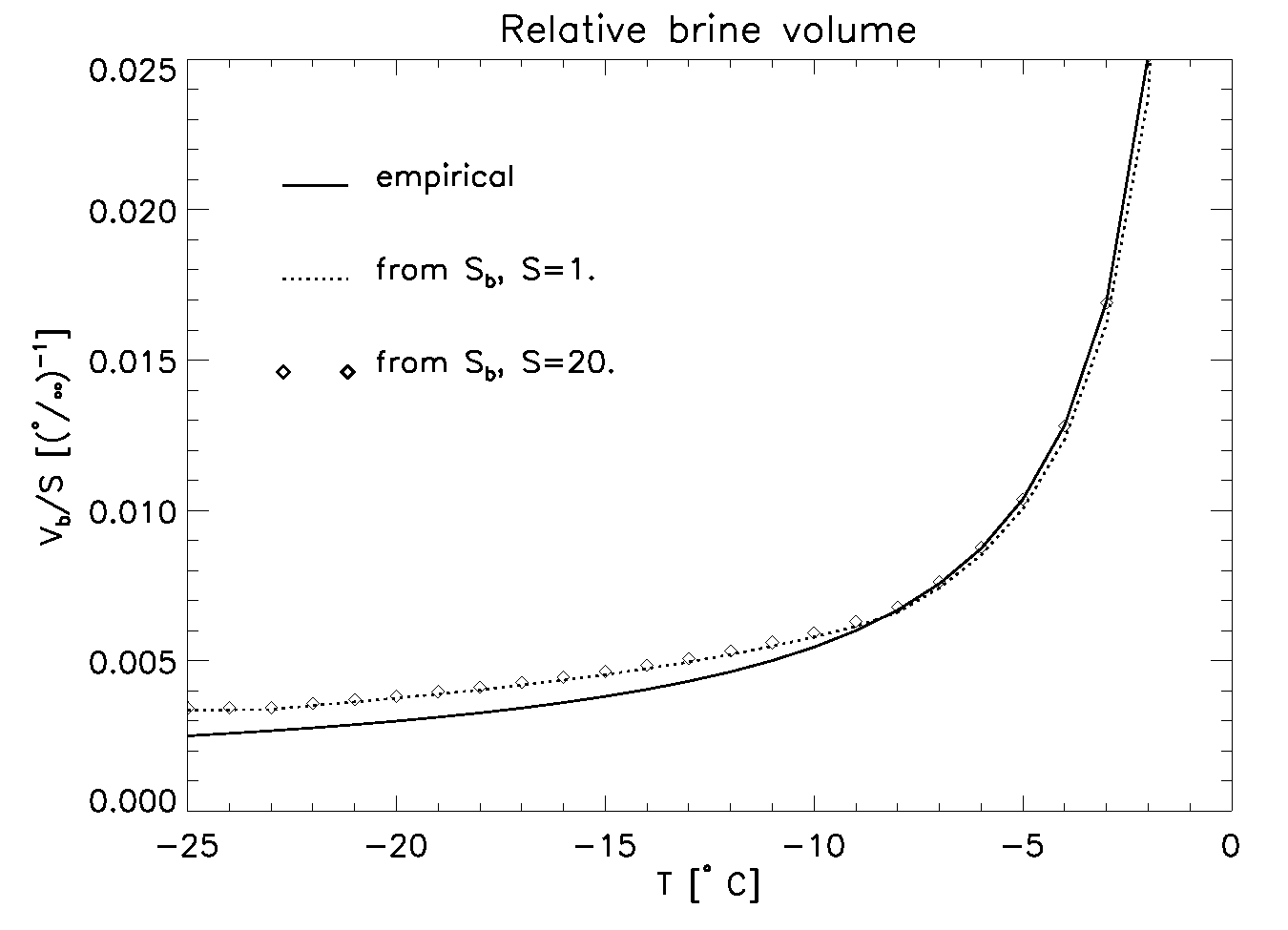
Ratio of brine volume to total salinity as a function of temperature

Brine entrapped in sea ice will always be at or near freezing, since any departure will either cause some of the water in the brine to freeze, or melt some of the surrounding ice. Thus, brine salinity is variable and can be determined based strictly on temperature—see freezing point depression. There are empirical formulas relating sea ice temperature to brine salinity.

The relative brine volume, V_{b}, is defined as the fraction of brine relative to the total volume. It too is highly variable, however its value is more difficult to determine since changes in temperature may cause some of the brine to be ejected or move within the layers, particularly in new ice. Writing equations relating the salt content of the brine, the total salt content, the brine volume, the density of the brine and the density of the ice and solving for brine volume produces the following relation:

$$V_b=\frac{S \rho_i}{S_b \rho_b - S \rho_b + S \rho_i}$$

where S is sea ice salinity, S_{b} is brine salinity, $\rho_i$ is the density of the ice and $\rho_b$ is brine density. Compare with this empirical formula from Frankenstein and Garner:

$$V_b = 10^{-3}S\left(-\frac{49.185}{T}+0.532\right)$$

where T is ice temperature in degrees Celsius and S is ice salinity in parts per thousand.

In new ice, the amount of brine ejected as the ice cools can be determined by assuming that the total volume stays constant and subtracting the volume increase from the brine volume. Note that this is only applicable to newly formed ice: any warming will tend to generate air pockets as the brine volume will increase more slowly than the ice volume decreases, again due to the density difference. Cox and Weeks provide the following formula determining the ratio of total ice salinity between temperatures, T_{1} and T_{2} where T_{2} < T_{1}:

$$\frac{S(T_2)}{S(T_1)}=\frac{S_b(T_2) \left (1-1/\rho_i \right)}{S_b(T_1)}\frac{\rho_b(T_2)}{\rho_b(T_1)}
\exp \left \lbrace \frac{c}{\rho_i \left[S_b(T_1) - S_b(T_2)\right ]} \right \rbrace$$

where c=0.8 kg m^{−3} is a constant. As the ice goes through constant warming and cooling cycles it becomes progressively more porous, through ejection of the brine and drainage through the resulting channels.

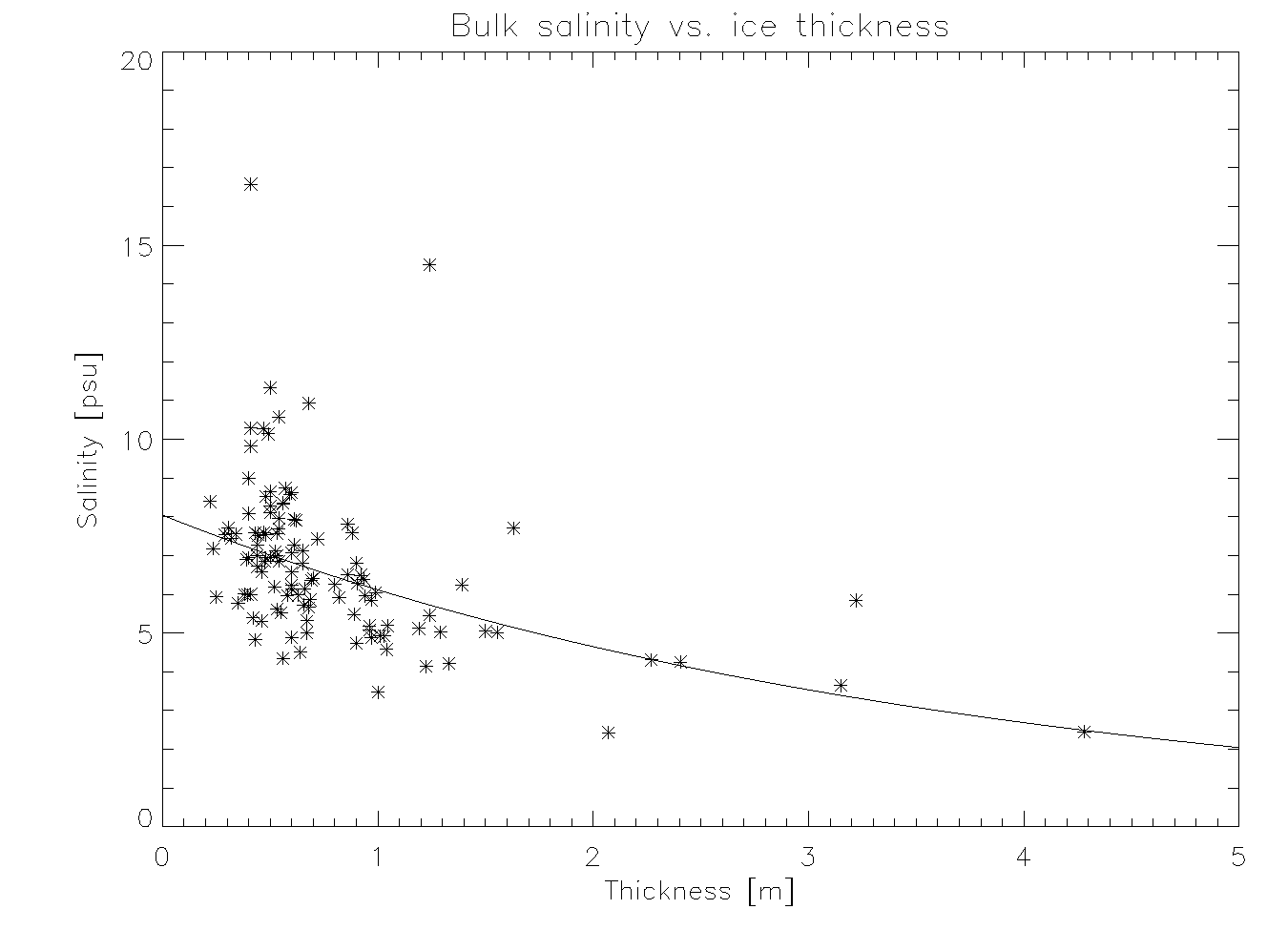
Plot of bulk salinity versus ice thickness for ice cores taken from the Weddell Sea. Courtesy Hajo Eicken

The figure above shows a scatter plot of salinity versus ice thickness for ice cores taken from the Weddell Sea, Antarctica, with an exponential fit of the form, $S = \exp(a h + b)$, overlaid, where h is ice thickness and a and b are constants.

== Horizontal motion ==
The horizontal motion of sea ice is quite difficult to model because ice is a non-Newtonian fluid. Sea ice will deform primarily at fracture points which in turn will form at the points of greatest stress and lowest strength, or where the ratio between the two is a maximum. Ice thickness, salinity and porosity will all affect the strength of the ice. The motion of the ice is driven primarily by ocean currents, though to a lesser extent by wind. Note that stresses will not be in the direction of the winds or currents, but rather will be shifted by Coriolis effects—see, for instance, Ekman spiral.

== See also ==
- Sea ice
- Sea ice thickness
- Sea ice concentration
- Sea ice emissivity modelling
