= Sea Ice Physics and Ecosystem eXperiment =

The Sea Ice Physics and Ecosystem eXperiment (SIPEX) was an Australian contribution to the International Polar Year (IPY). The expedition studied the sea ice in the Antarctica zone in September and October 2007, investigating links between the sea ice and the Southern Ocean ecosystems.

Taking part were 45 scientists from 8 different countries, each a specialist on some aspect of the Antarctic sea ice zone. Travelling aboard the research vessel Aurora Australis, the researchers covered East Antarctica between 110°E and 130°E. Experiments dealt with ice thickness and snow cover, the sympagic fauna and flora and examined the effects of ocean currents and wind.

The extent and distribution of sea ice in the polar regions is a sensitive indicator of global climate change. Global warming has been implicated in significant reductions in the extent of sea ice and this trend is set to continue. An improved understanding of sea ice may lead to improved conservation policies in Antarctica.
