= ICESat =

NASA satellite to observe ice sheets, clouds, and land (2003–2010)

ICESat-1
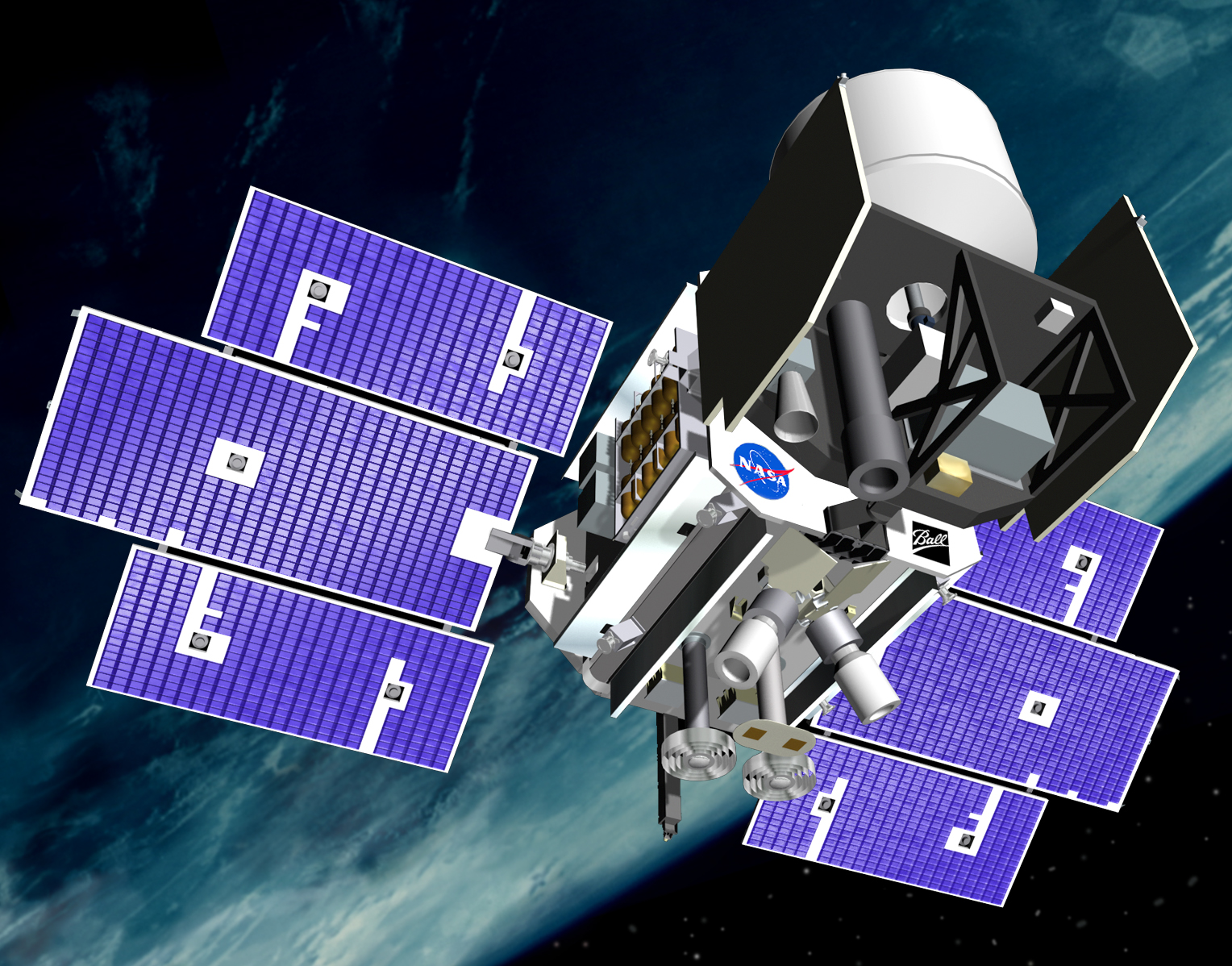
- Artist's rendering of the ICESat-1 satellite
- Names: Ice, Cloud, and land Elevation Satellite
- Mission type: Earth observation
- Operator: NASA
- COSPAR ID: 2003-002A
- SATCAT no.: 27642
- Website: ICESat
- Mission duration: 5 years (planned); 7 years, 1 month (achieved)

Spacecraft properties
- Bus: BCP-2000
- Manufacturer: Ball Aerospace
- Launch mass: 970 kg (2,140 lb)
- Dimensions: 2 × 2 × 3.1 m (6 ft 7 in × 6 ft 7 in × 10 ft 2 in)
- Power: 640 watts

Start of mission
- Launch date: 13 January 2003, 00:45:00 UTC
- Rocket: Delta II 7320-10; D-294
- Launch site: Vandenberg, SLC-2W
- Contractor: Boeing
- Entered service: 2003

End of mission
- Declared: October 11 2009
- Deactivated: 14 August 2010, 17:37 UTC
- Decay date: 30 August 2010, 08:49 UTC

Orbital parameters
- Reference system: Geocentric orbit
- Regime: Low Earth orbit
- Perigee altitude: 586 km (364 mi)
- Apogee altitude: 594 km (369 mi)
- Inclination: 94.00°
- Period: 96.60 minutes
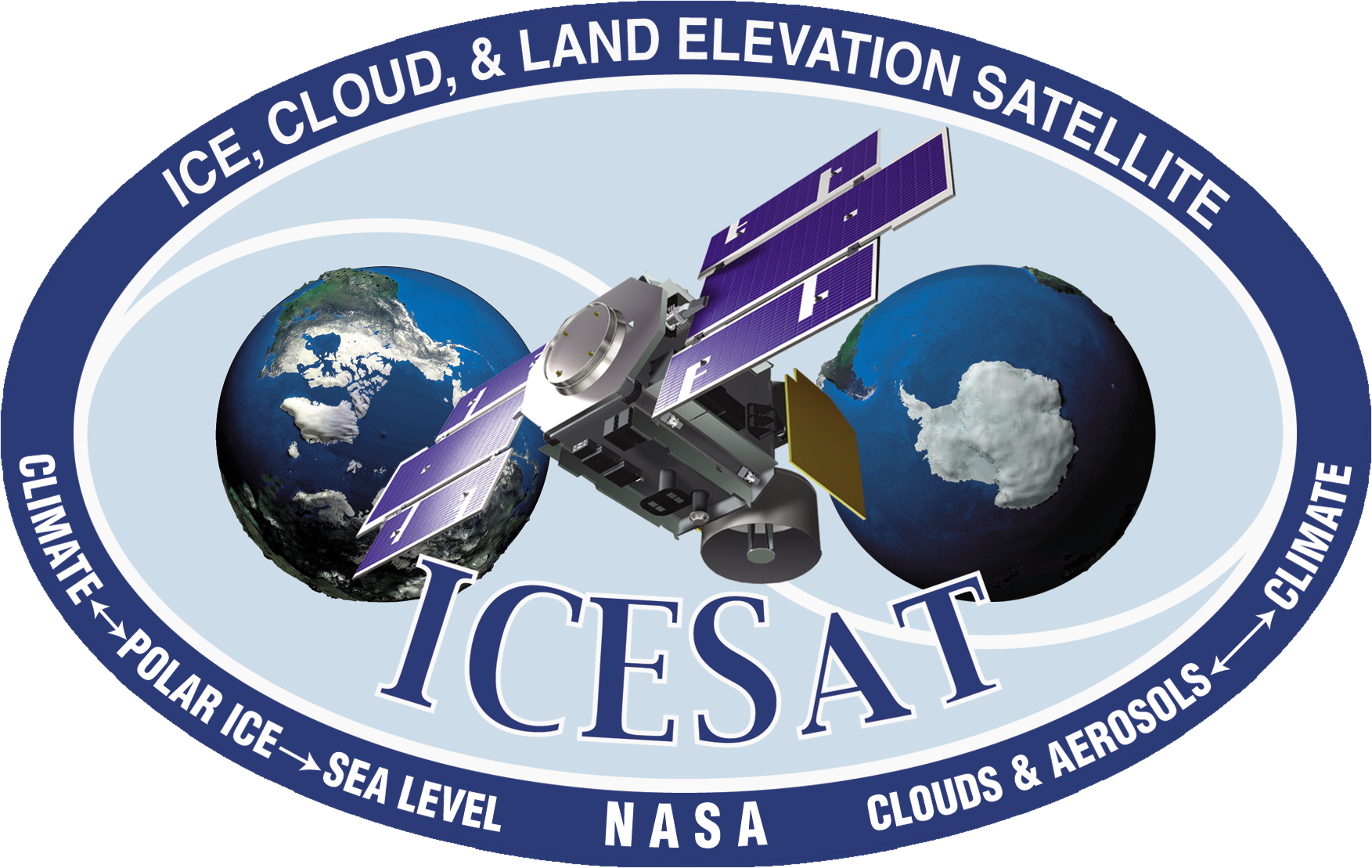
- ICESat mission patch Large Strategic Science Missions; Earth Science Division Earth Observing System

ICESat (Ice, Cloud, and land Elevation Satellite) was a NASA satellite mission for measuring ice sheet mass balance, cloud and aerosol heights, as well as land topography and vegetation characteristics. It operated as part of NASA's Earth Observing System (EOS). ICESat was launched 13 January 2003 on a Delta II launch vehicle from Vandenberg Air Force Base in California into a near-circular, near-polar orbit with an altitude of approximately 600 km (370 mi). It operated for seven years before being retired in February 2010, after its scientific payload shut down and scientists were unable to restart it.

The ICESat mission was designed to provide elevation data needed to determine ice sheet mass balance as well as cloud property information, especially for stratospheric clouds common over polar areas. It provides topography and vegetation data around the globe, in addition to the polar-specific coverage over the Greenland and Antarctic ice sheets. The satellite was found useful in assessing important forest characteristics, including tree density.

== Satellite instruments ==
The sole instrument on ICESat was the Geoscience Laser Altimeter System (GLAS), a space-based lidar. GLAS combined a precision surface lidar with a sensitive dual-wavelength cloud and aerosol lidar. The GLAS lasers emit infrared and visible laser pulses at 1064- and 532-nm wavelengths. As ICESat orbited, GLAS produced a series of approximately 70 m (230 ft) diameter laser spots that were separated by nearly 170 m (560 ft) along the spacecraft's ground track. During the commissioning phase of the mission, the ICESat was placed into an orbit which allowed the ground track to repeat every 8 days. During August and September 2004, the satellite was maneuvered into a 91-day repeating ground track for the main portion of the mission.

== Operational history ==
ICESat was designed to operate for three to five years. Testing indicated that each GLAS laser should last for two years, requiring GLAS to carry three lasers in order to fulfill the nominal mission length. During the initial on orbit test operation, a pump diode module on the first GLAS laser failed prematurely on 29 March 2003. A subsequent investigation indicated that a corrosive degradation of the pump diodes, due to an unexpected but known reaction between indium solder and gold bonding wires, had possibly reduced the reliability of the lasers. Consequentially, the total operational life for the GLAS instrument was expected to be as little as less than a year as a result. After the two months of full operation in the fall of 2003, the operational plan for GLAS was changed, and it was operated for one-month periods out of every three to six months in order to extend the time series of measurements, particularly for the ice sheets. The last laser failed on 11 October 2009, and following attempts to restart it, the satellite was retired in February 2010. Between 23 June 2010 and 14 July 2010, the spacecraft was maneuvered into a lower orbit in order to speed up orbital decay. On 14 August 2010, it was decommissioned, and at 08:49 UTC on 30 August 2010 it reentered the atmosphere.

== Follow-on satellite ==
A follow-on mission, ICESat-2, was developed by NASA to continue studying polar ice changes, and the biomass and carbon in vegetation. The satellite was launched on 15 September 2018 aboard a Delta II launch vehicle. For the period of time in between the two satellites, NASA's Operation IceBridge used a Douglas DC-8 aircraft as a stopgap to measure ice thickness and collect other data.
