= Sea ice thickness =

Measurement of the spatial extent of sea ice

Sea ice thickness spatial extent, and open water within sea ice packs can vary rapidly in response to weather and climate. Sea ice concentration is measured by satellites, with the Special Sensor Microwave Imager / Sounder (SSMIS), and the European Space Agency's Cryosat-2 satellite to map the thickness and shape of the Earth's polar ice cover. The sea ice volume is calculated with the Pan-Arctic Ice Ocean Modeling and Assimilation System (PIOMAS), which blends satellite-observed data, such as sea ice concentrations into model calculations to estimate sea ice thickness and volume. Sea ice thickness determines a number of important fluxes such as heat flux between the air and ocean surface—see below—as well as salt and fresh water fluxes between the ocean since saline water ejects much of its salt content when frozen—see sea ice growth processes. It is also important for navigators on icebreakers since there is an upper limit to the thickness of ice any ship can sail through.

== Measurement ==
Ice thickness can be measured in various ways, directly by taking an ice core and measuring it, remotely using point measurements from ice mass balance buoys, or more efficiently with satellite measurements. Measurements of ice depth below the waterline (or draft) by submarine sonar or radar systems can give good estimates of ice thickness provided there isn't too much snow (which is less dense than ice) on top.

Sea ice freeboard is the difference between the height of the surface of sea ice and the water in open leads. Since 85–95% of snow-free sea ice is usually located below the waterline, the computation of the thickness is fairly simple; however, accurate measurement of ice freeboard is hindered by several factors including snow cover, and modeling of this data is being constantly improved.

=== Satellites ===
The Ice, Cloud, and land Elevation Satellite (ICESat), measured ice sheet mass balance, cloud and aerosol heights, and land topography and vegetation characteristics, with an active service period from February 2003 to October 2009.

The European Space Agency Soil Moisture and Ocean Salinity (SMOS) mission is the first orbital mission to measure salinity of the Earth’s surface and able to show data through most clouds and during darkness.

The sea ice volume is calculated with the Pan-Arctic Ice Ocean Modeling and Assimilation System (PIOMAS).

=== Other methods ===
The E-M Bird ice thickness meter, designed by the Alfred Wegener Institute for Polar and Marine Research, is carried aloft by helicopter and measures ice thickness with a combination of a pair of inductance coils that measure the ice-water interface based inductance variations—similar to a metal detector—and a laser altimeter which measures the ice surface. It was used on a small scale in 2007 to supplement microwave radiometer measurements during the Pol-Ice campaign and on a much larger scale during the GreenICE (Greenland Arctic Shelf Ice and Climate Experiment) campaign conducted in 2004 and 2005.

== See also ==
- Sea ice concentration
- Sea ice growth processes
