= Sea ice =

Outcome of seawater as it freezes

Broken pieces of Arctic sea ice with a snow cover

Sea ice forms as seawater freezes. Because ice is less dense than liquid water, it floats on the ocean's surface (just like fresh water ice). Sea ice covers about 7% of the Earth's surface and about 12% of the world's oceans. Much of the world's sea ice is enclosed within the polar ice packs in the Earth's polar regions: the Arctic ice pack of the Arctic Ocean and the Antarctic ice pack of the Southern Ocean. Polar packs naturally undergo significant yearly cycling, reaching their greatest surface extent in winter and retreating in summer.

Within the ice, salty brine channels provide habitat for microorganisms that form the base of unique food webs. The presence or absence of sea ice also shapes navigation routes, regional weather, and global ocean circulation. Sea ice plays a key role in Earth's climate. Its white surface reflects the Sun's energy back into space, helping to keep the planet cool in a process known as the albedo effect. Sea ice also insulates the ocean below, limiting the transfer of heat, water vapor, and gases such as carbon dioxide between the sea and the atmosphere.

Satellite records have shown a marked decline in Arctic sea ice extent and thickness in recent decades, a trend linked to global climate change. Antarctic sea ice shows more regional variability but is recently also experiencing declines.

Sea ice is dynamic, due to the action of winds, currents and temperature fluctuations, which lead to a wide variety of ice types and features. Sea ice differs from icebergs, which are chunks of ice shelves or glaciers that calve into the ocean. Depending on location, sea ice may contain embedded icebergs.

== Features and types ==
Hypothetical sea ice dynamics scenario showing some of the most common sea ice features (the bear provides an approximate scale)

Sea ice does not simply grow and melt. During its lifespan, it is very dynamic. Due to the combined action of winds, currents, water temperature and air temperature fluctuations, sea ice expanses typically undergo a significant amount of deformation. Sea ice is classified according to whether or not it is able to drift and according to its age.

=== Physical properties ===
Sea ice is a composite material made up of pure ice, liquid brine, air, and salt. The volumetric fractions of these components—ice, brine, and air—determine the key physical properties of sea ice, including thermal conductivity, heat capacity, latent heat, density, elastic modulus, and mechanical strength. Brine volume fraction depends on sea-ice salinity and temperature, while sea-ice salinity mainly depends on ice age and thickness. During the ice growth period, its bulk brine volume is typically below 5%. Air volume fraction during ice growth period is typically around 1–2 %, but may substantially increase upon ice warming. Air volume of sea ice in can be as high as 15 % in summer and 4 % in autumn. Both brine and air volumes influence sea-ice density values, which are typically around 840–910 kg/m^{3} for first-year ice. First-year ice has a strong seasonality of its density, with higher values around 910–920 kg/m^{3} in winter and lower values around 860–880 kg/m^{3} in summer. Density of second- and multiyear ice typically has a weaker seasonality and lower density than for first-year ice. Sea-ice density is a significant source of errors in sea-ice thickness retrieval using radar and laser satellite altimetry, resulting in uncertainties of 0.3–0.4 m.

=== Fast ice versus drift (or pack) ice ===
Sea ice can be classified according to whether or not it is attached (or frozen) to the shoreline (or between shoals or to grounded icebergs). If attached, it is called landfast ice, or more often, fast ice (as in fastened). Alternatively and unlike fast ice, drift ice occurs further offshore in very wide areas and encompasses ice that is free to move with currents and winds. The physical boundary between fast ice and drift ice is the fast ice boundary. The drift ice zone may be further divided into a shear zone, a marginal ice zone (MIZ) and a central pack. MIZ is the transition region between the open ocean and the more consolidated pack ice. It is commonly characterised by fragmented sea ice composed of individual floes that span a wide range of sizes. The statistical distribution of floe sizes, referred to as the floe size distribution (FSD), is an important property of the ice cover influencing processes such as wave–ice interaction, lateral melting, and momentum and heat exchange between the ocean and atmosphere.Drift ice consists of floes, individual pieces of sea ice 20 metres (66 ft) or more across. There are names for various floe sizes: small – 20 to 100 m (66 to 328 ft); medium – 100 to 500 m (330 to 1,640 ft); big – 500 to 2,000 m (1,600 to 6,600 ft); vast – 2 to 10 kilometres (1.2 to 6.2 mi); and giant – more than 10 km (6.2 mi). The term pack ice is used either as a synonym of drift ice, or to designate drift ice zone in which the floes are densely packed. The overall sea ice cover is termed the ice canopy from the perspective of submarine navigation.

=== Classification by age ===
Another classification used by scientists to describe sea ice is based on age, that is, on its development stages. These stages are: new ice, nilas, young ice, first-year and old.

==== New ice, nilas and young ice ====
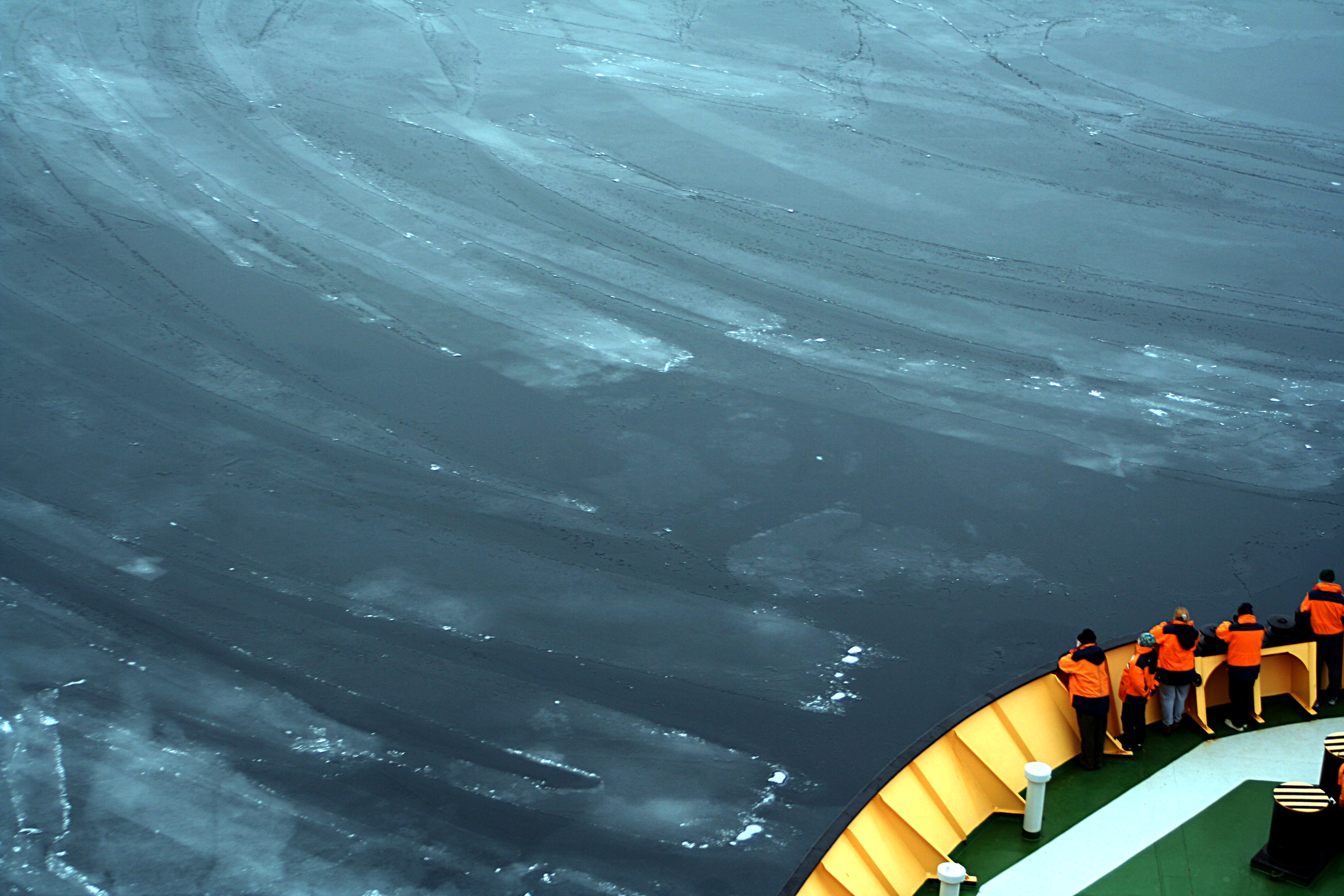
Nilas in Baffin Bay

New ice is a general term used for recently frozen sea water that does not yet make up solid ice. It may consist of frazil ice (plates or spicules of ice suspended in water), slush (water saturated snow), or shuga (spongy white ice lumps a few centimeters across). Other terms, such as grease ice and pancake ice, are used for ice crystal accumulations under the action of wind and waves. When sea ice begins to form on a beach with a light swell, ice eggs up to the size of a football can be created.

Nilas designates a sea ice crust up to 10 centimetres (3.9 in) in thickness. It bends without breaking around waves and swells. Nilas can be further subdivided into dark nilas – up to 5 cm (2.0 in) in thickness and very dark and light nilas – over 5 cm (2.0 in) in thickness and lighter in color.

Young ice is a transition stage between nilas and first-year ice and ranges in thickness from 10 cm (3.9 in) to 30 cm (12 in), Young ice can be further subdivided into grey ice – 10 cm (3.9 in) to 15 cm (5.9 in) in thickness and grey-white ice – 15 cm (5.9 in) to 30 cm (12 in) in thickness. Young ice is not as flexible as nilas, but tends to break under wave action. Under compression, it will either raft (at the grey ice stage) or ridge (at the grey-white ice stage).

==== First-year sea ice ====
Distinction between first-year sea ice (FY), second-year (SY), multiyear (MY) and old ice

First-year sea ice is ice that is thicker than young ice but has no more than one year growth. In other words, it is ice that grows in the fall and winter (after it has gone through the new ice – nilas – young ice stages and grows further) but does not survive the spring and summer months (it melts away). The thickness of this ice typically ranges from 0.3 m (0.98 ft) to 2 m (6.6 ft). First-year ice may be further divided into thin (30 cm (0.98 ft) to 70 cm (2.3 ft)), medium (70 cm (2.3 ft) to 120 cm (3.9 ft)) and thick (>120 cm (3.9 ft)).

==== Old sea ice ====
Old sea ice is sea ice that has survived at least one melting season (i.e. one summer). For this reason, this ice is generally thicker than first-year sea ice. The thickness of old sea ice typically ranges from 2 to 4 m. Old ice is commonly divided into two types: second-year ice, which has survived one melting season and multiyear ice, which has survived more than one. (In some sources, old ice is more than two years old.) Multi-year ice is much more common in the Arctic than it is in the Antarctic. The reason for this is that sea ice in the south drifts into warmer waters where it melts. In the Arctic, much of the sea ice is land-locked.

=== Leads and polynyas ===
Leads and polynyas are areas of open water that occur within sea ice expanses even though air temperatures are below freezing. They provide a direct interaction between the ocean and the atmosphere, which is important for the wildlife. Leads are narrow and linear, varying in width from meters to kilometers. During the winter, the water in leads quickly freezes up. They are also used for navigation purposes – even when refrozen, the ice in leads is thinner, allowing icebreakers access to an easier sail path and submarines to surface more easily. Polynyas are more uniform in size than leads and are also larger – two types are recognized: 1) Sensible-heat polynyas, caused by the upwelling of warmer water and 2) Latent-heat polynyas, resulting from persistent winds from the coastline.

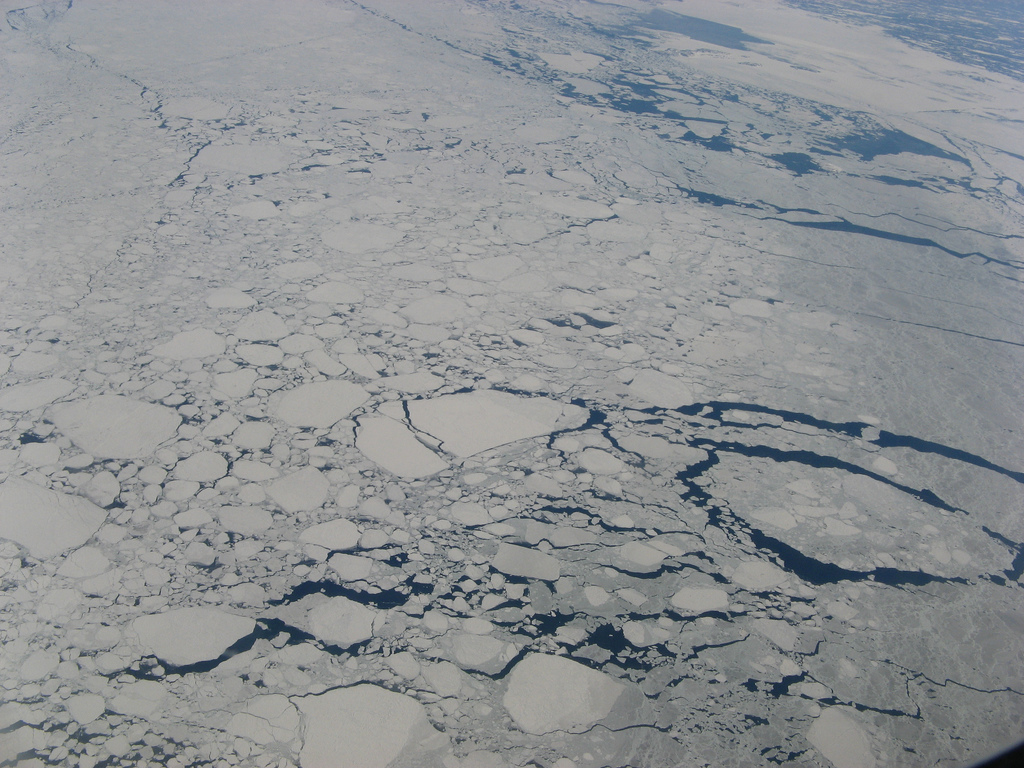
Aerial view showing an expanse of drift ice offshore Labrador (Eastern Canada) displaying floes of various sizes loosely packed, with open water in several networks of leads. (Scale not available.)

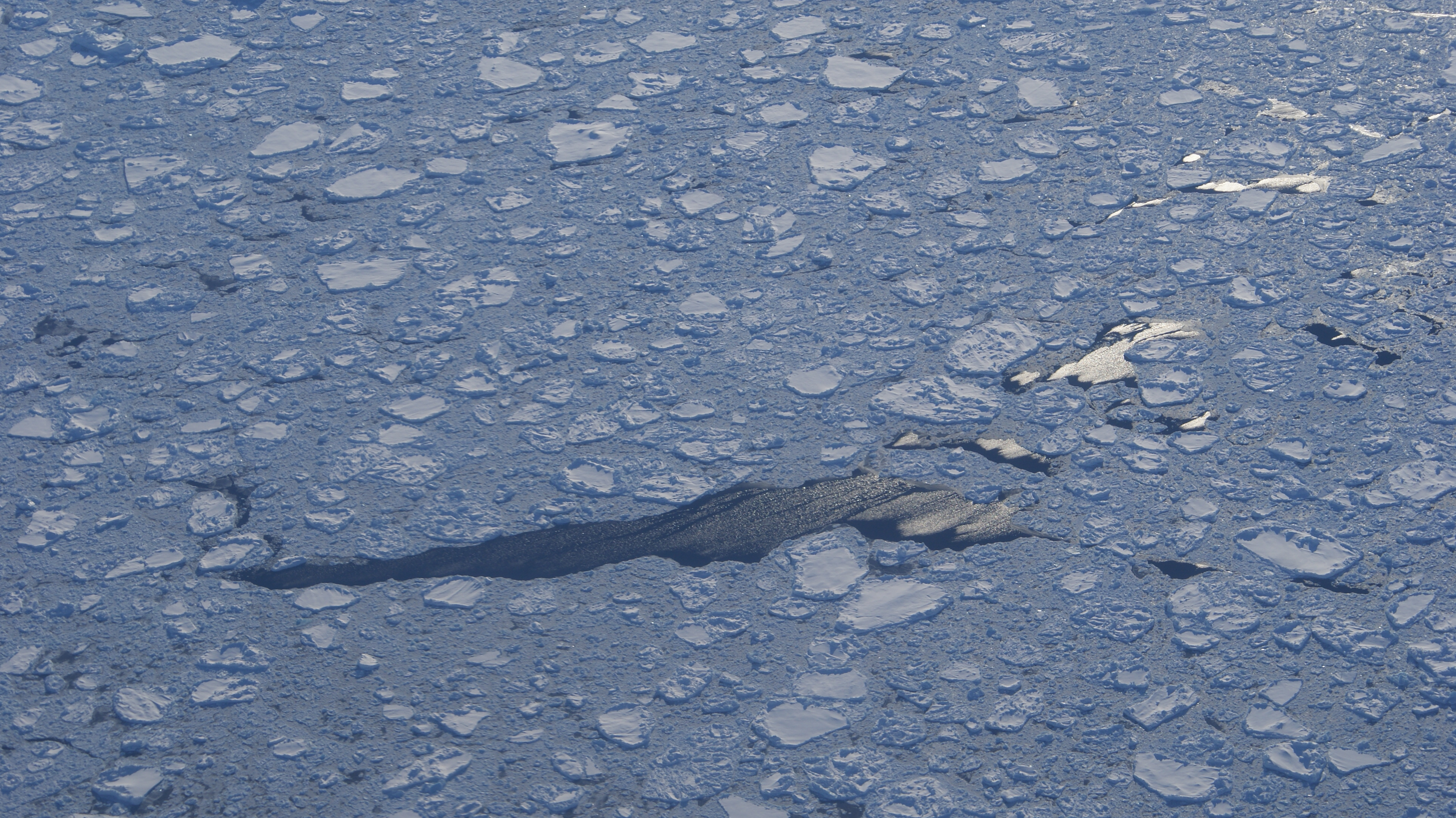
Aerial view showing an expanse of drift ice in southeastern Greenland, comprising loosely packed floes of various sizes, with a lead developing in the centre.(Scale not available.)

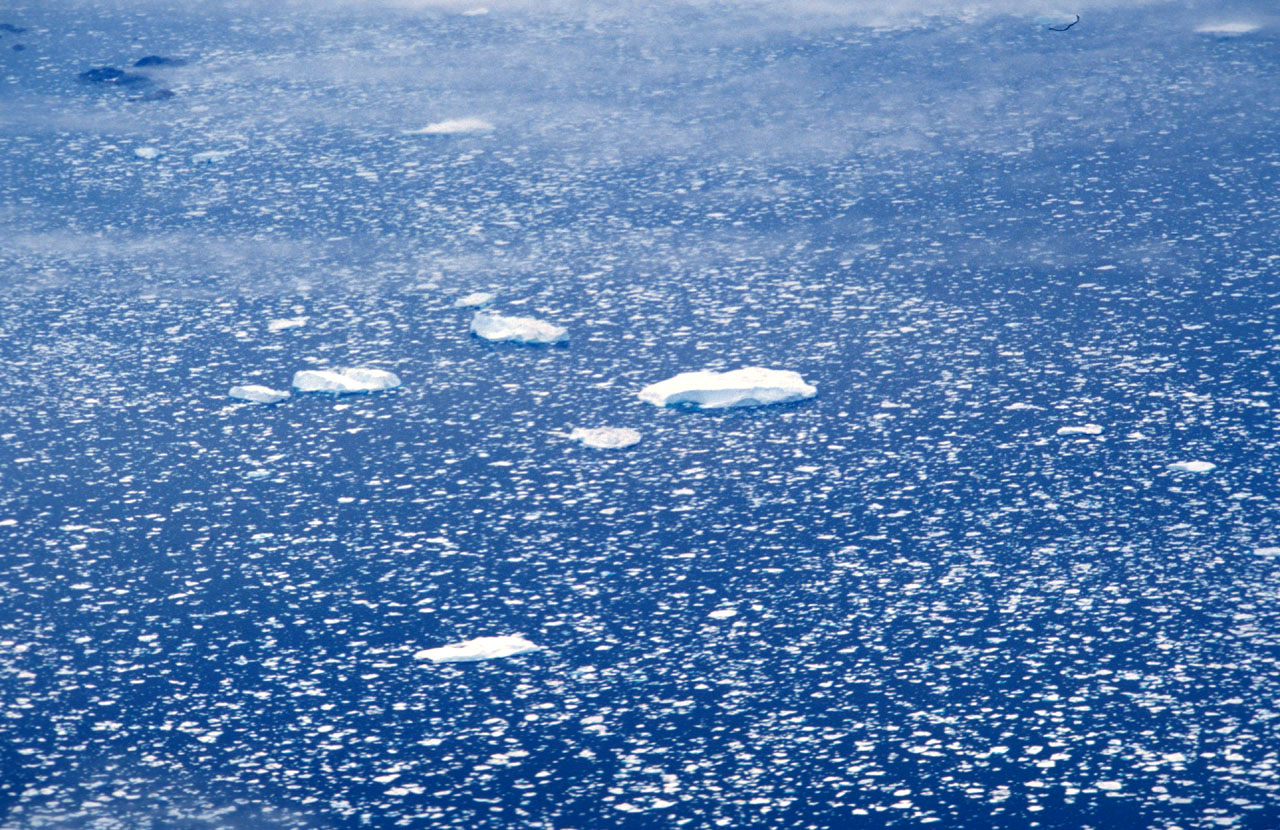
Aerial view showing an expanse of drift ice consisting mostly of water. (Scale not available.)

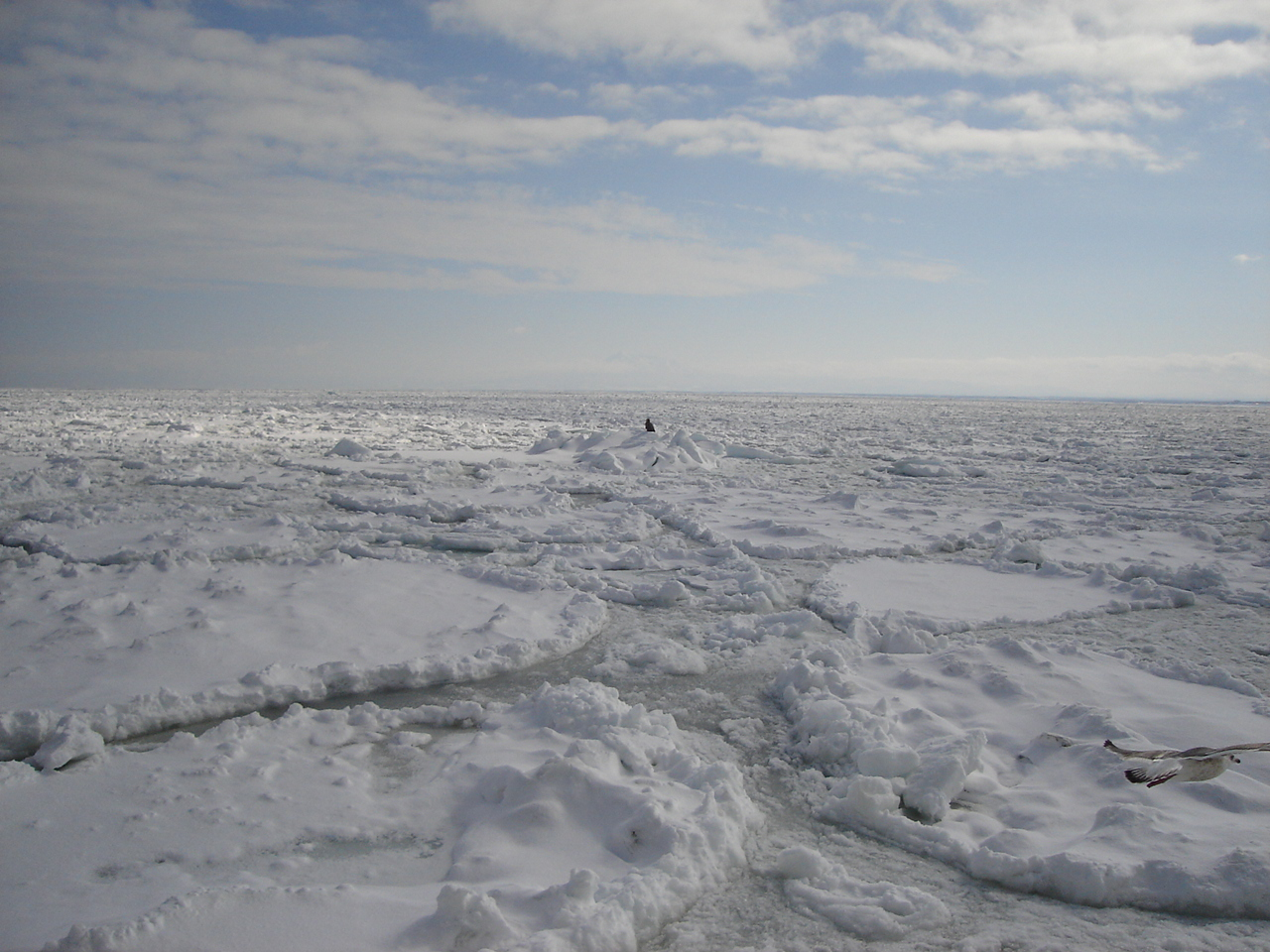
Close-up view inside a drift ice zone: several small rounded floes are separated from each other by slush or grease ice. (Bird at lower right for scale.)

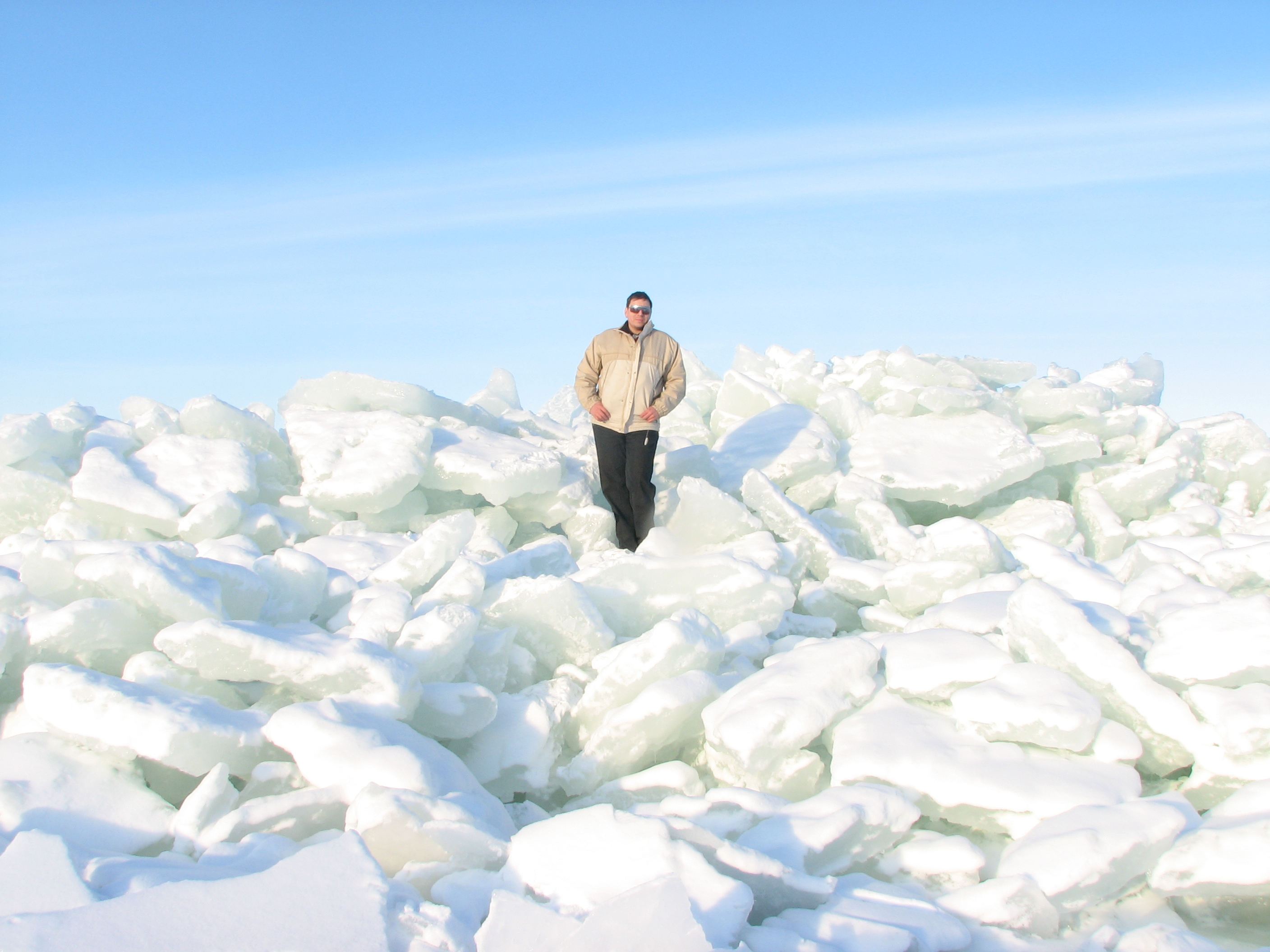
Example of hummocky ice: an accumulation of ice blocks, here about 20 to 30 cm (7.9 to 11.8 in) in thickness (with a thin snow cover).

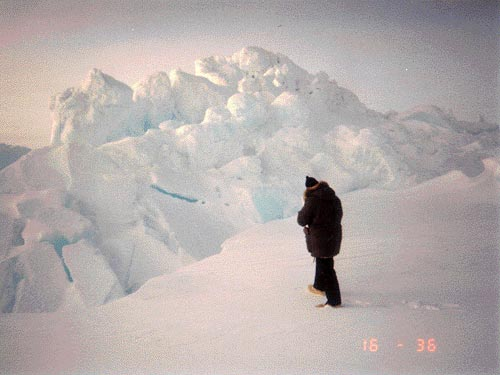
Field example of a pressure ridge. Only the sail (the part of the ridge above the ice surface) is shown in this photograph – the keel is more difficult to document.

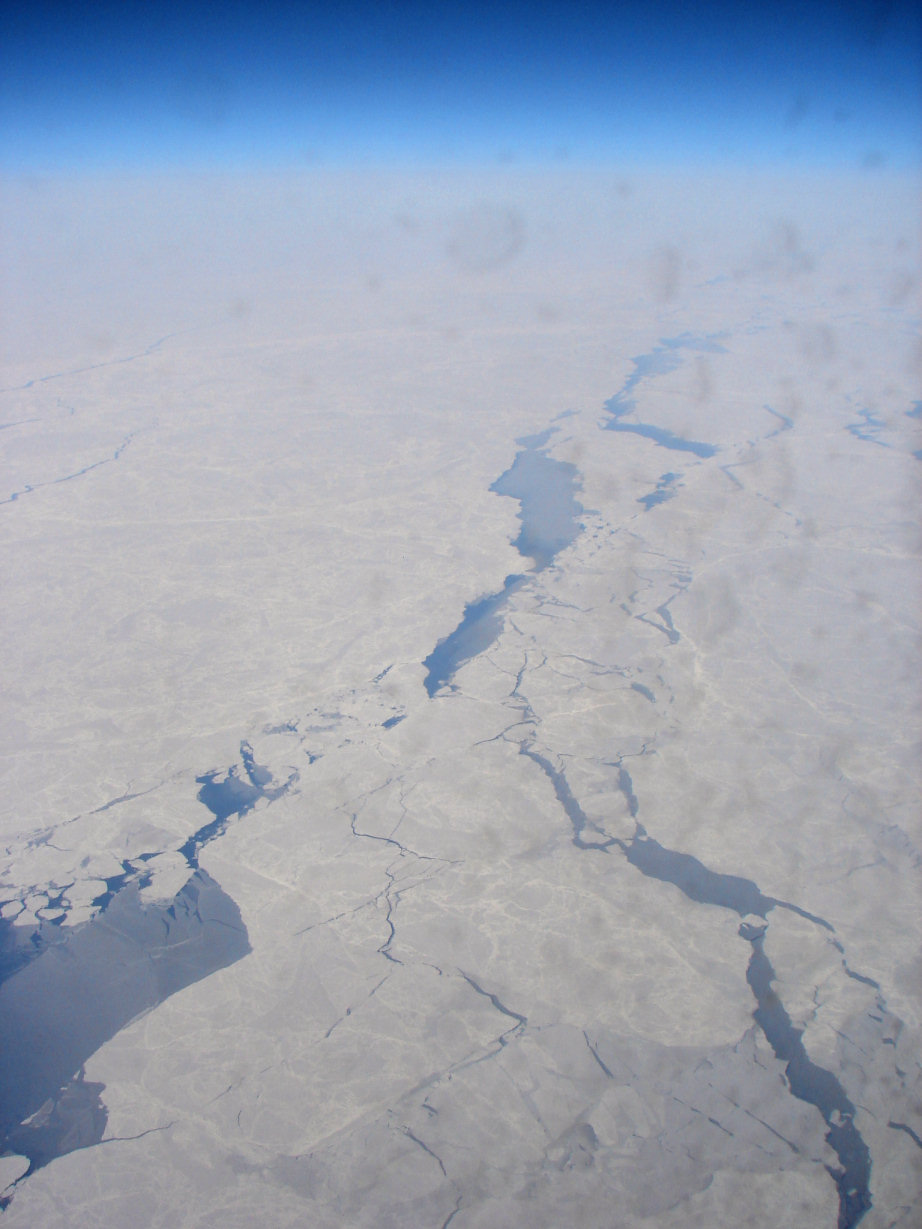
Aerial view of the Chukchi Sea between Chukotka and Alaska, displaying a pattern of leads. Much of the open water inside those leads is already covered by new ice (indicated by a slightly lighter blue color)(scale not available).

== Dynamics and cycles ==
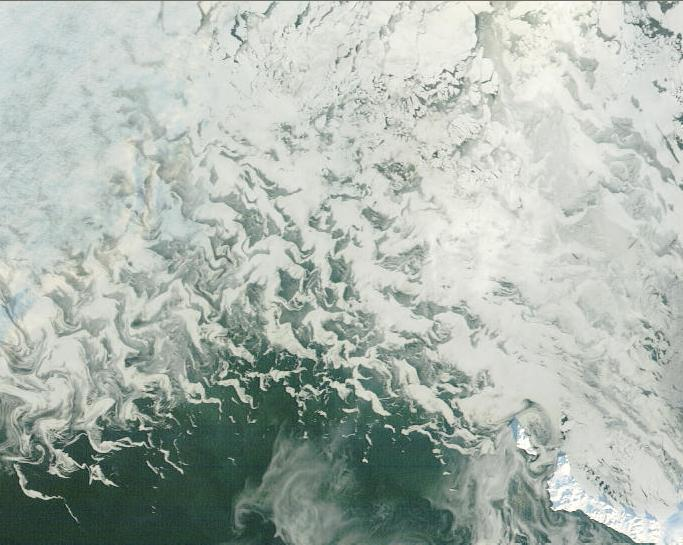
Satellite image of sea ice forming near St. Matthew Island in the Bering Sea

=== Formation ===
Only the top layer of water needs to cool to the freezing point. Convection of the surface layer involves the top 100–150 m (330–490 ft), down to the pycnocline of increased density.

In calm water, the first sea ice to form on the surface is a skim of separate crystals which initially are in the form of tiny discs, floating flat on the surface and of diameter less than 0.3 cm (0.12 in). Each disc has its c-axis vertical and grows outwards laterally. At a certain point such a disc shape becomes unstable and the growing isolated crystals take on a hexagonal, stellar form, with long fragile arms stretching out over the surface. These crystals also have their c-axis vertical. The dendritic arms are very fragile and soon break off, leaving a mixture of discs and arm fragments. With any kind of turbulence in the water, these fragments break up further into random-shaped small crystals which form a suspension of increasing density in the surface water, an ice type called frazil or grease ice. In quiet conditions the frazil crystals soon freeze together to form a continuous thin sheet of young ice; in its early stages, when it is still transparent – that is the ice called nilas. Once nilas has formed, a quite different growth process occurs, in which water freezes on to the bottom of the existing ice sheet, a process called congelation growth. This growth process yields first-year ice.

In rough water, fresh sea ice is formed by the cooling of the ocean as heat is lost into the atmosphere. The uppermost layer of the ocean is supercooled to slightly below the freezing point, at which time tiny ice platelets (frazil ice) form. With time, this process leads to a mushy surface layer, known as grease ice. Frazil ice formation may also be started by snowfall, rather than supercooling. Waves and wind then act to compress these ice particles into larger plates, of several meters in diameter, called pancake ice. These float on the ocean surface and collide with one another, forming upturned edges. In time, the pancake ice plates may themselves be rafted over one another or frozen together into a more solid ice cover, known as consolidated pancake ice. Such ice has a very rough appearance on top and bottom.

If sufficient snow falls on sea ice to depress the freeboard below sea level, sea water will flow in and a layer of ice will form of mixed snow/sea water. This is particularly common around Antarctica.

=== Ice motion ===
While fast ice is relatively stable (because it is attached to the shoreline or the seabed), drift (or pack) ice undergoes relatively complex deformation processes that ultimately give rise to sea ice's typically wide variety of landscapes. Wind is the main driving force, along with ocean currents. The Coriolis force and sea ice surface tilt have also been invoked. These driving forces induce a state of stress within the drift ice zone. An ice floe converging toward another and pushing against it will generate a state of compression at the boundary between both. The ice cover may also undergo a state of tension, resulting in divergence and fissure opening. If two floes drift sideways past each other while remaining in contact, this will create a state of shear.

=== Deformation ===
Sea ice deformation results from the interaction between ice floes as they are driven against each other. The result may be of three types of features: 1) Rafted ice, when one piece is overriding another; 2) Pressure ridges, a line of broken ice forced downward (to make up the keel) and upward (to make the sail); and 3) Hummock, a hillock of broken ice that forms an uneven surface. A shear ridge is a pressure ridge that formed under shear – it tends to be more linear than a ridge induced only by compression. A new ridge is a recent feature – it is sharp-crested, with its side sloping at an angle exceeding 40 degrees. In contrast, a weathered ridge is one with a rounded crest and with sides sloping at less than 40 degrees. Stamukhi are yet another type of pile-up but these are grounded and are therefore relatively stationary. They result from the interaction between fast ice and the drifting pack ice.

Level ice is sea ice that has not been affected by deformation and is therefore relatively flat.

=== Yearly freeze and melt cycle ===
Seasonal variation and annual decrease of Arctic sea ice volume as estimated by measurement backed numerical modeling

Decade-by-decade progression of arctic sea ice melting shows continued ice loss since 1980, with the greatest percentage loss rate experienced in the late summer and early autumn.

The extent (area) of Antarctic sea ice reached a new low in 2023. Chart shows how little sea ice remains in the Antarctic summer, which at one point in February 2023 was only about 60% of its 1981–2010 average.

The area of Arctic sea ice reached a minimum in September 2012, but recent years have shown less area than 2012 in other months. Late summer shows the greatest percentage loss.

The annual freeze and melt cycle is set by the annual cycle of solar insolation and of ocean and atmospheric temperature and of variability in this annual cycle.

In the Arctic, the area of ocean covered by sea ice increases over winter from a minimum in September to a maximum in March or sometimes February, before melting over the summer. In the Antarctic, where the seasons are reversed, the annual minimum is typically in February and the annual maximum in September or October. The presence of sea ice abutting the calving fronts of ice shelves has been shown to influence glacier flow and potentially the stability of the Antarctic ice sheet.

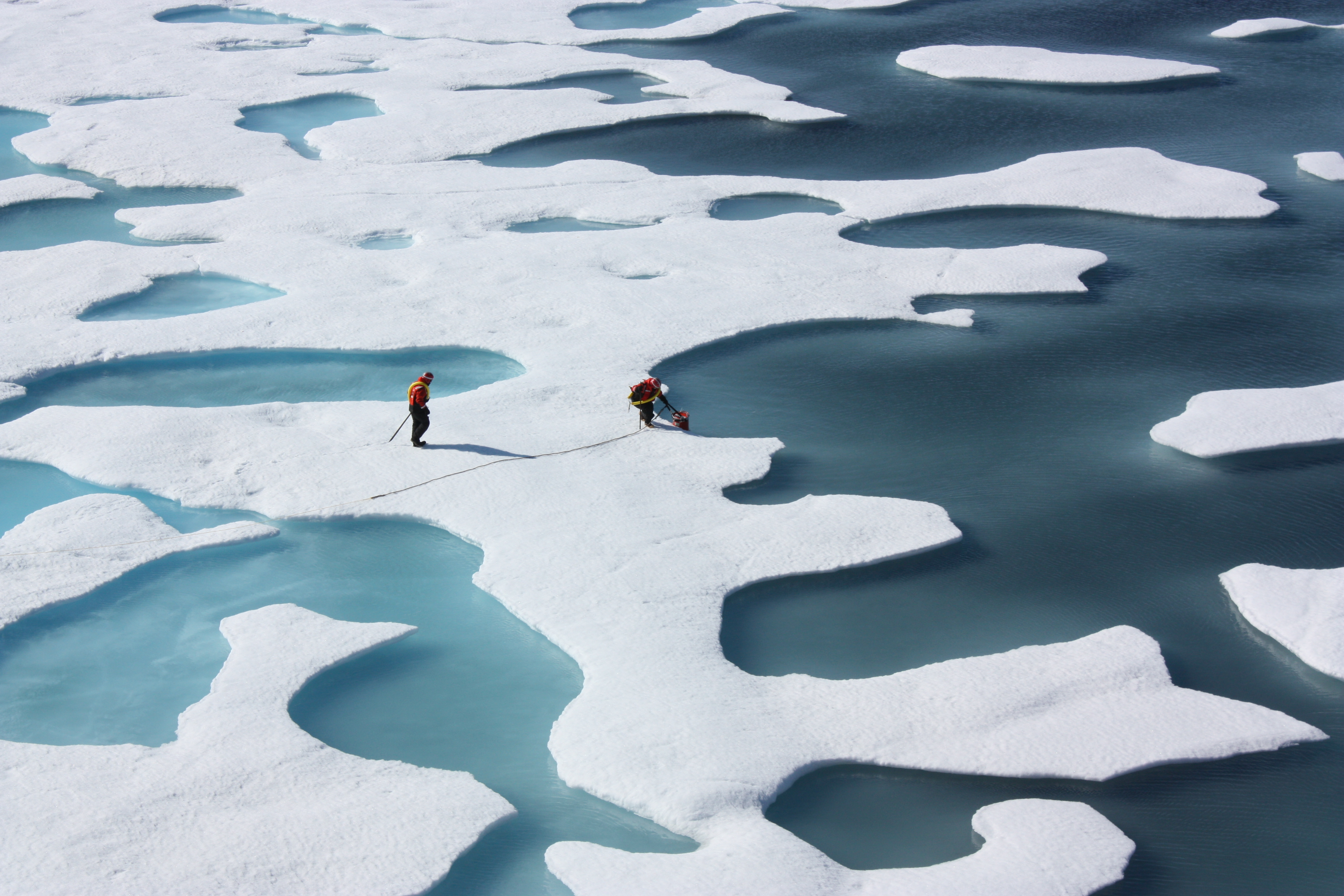
As ice melts, the liquid water collects in depressions on the surface and deepens them, forming these melt ponds in the Arctic. These freshwater ponds are separated from the salty sea below and around it, until breaks in the ice merge the two.

The growth and melt rate are also affected by the state of the ice itself. During growth, the ice thickening due to freezing (as opposed to dynamics) is itself dependent on the thickness, so that the ice growth slows as the ice thickens. Likewise, during melt, thinner sea ice melts faster. This leads to different behaviour between multiyear and first year ice. In addition, melt ponds on the ice surface during the melt season lower the albedo such that more solar radiation is absorbed, leading to a feedback where melt is accelerated. The presence of melt ponds is affected by the permeability of the sea ice (i.e. whether meltwater can drain) and the topography of the sea ice surface (i.e. the presence of natural basins for the melt ponds to form in). First year ice is flatter than multiyear ice due to the lack of dynamic ridging, so ponds tend to have greater area. They also have lower albedo since they are on thinner ice, which blocks less of the solar radiation from reaching the dark ocean below.

== Monitoring and trends ==
Changes in sea ice conditions are best demonstrated by the rate of melting over time. A composite record of Arctic ice demonstrates that the floes' retreat began around 1900, experiencing more rapid melting beginning within the past 50 years. Satellite study of sea ice began in 1979 and became a much more reliable measure of long-term changes in sea ice.

September Arctic sea ice extent is currently decreasing at about 12% per decade, compared to the 1981-2010 average. In comparison to the extended record, the sea-ice extent in the Arctic region by September 2007 was only half the recorded mass that had been estimated to exist within the 1950–1970 period. In September 2012 Arctic sea ice reached its lowest level ever recorded, covering just 24% of the Arctic Ocean, down from the previous record low of 29% in 2007. A new second-lowest extent was later set in 2020. Predictions of when the first "ice free" Arctic summer might occur vary but are anticipated by mid-century (2035-2067).

Antarctic sea ice extent increased gradually from the start of satellite observations in 1979 until spring 2016, when it began a rapid decline that is still continuing as of 2024.

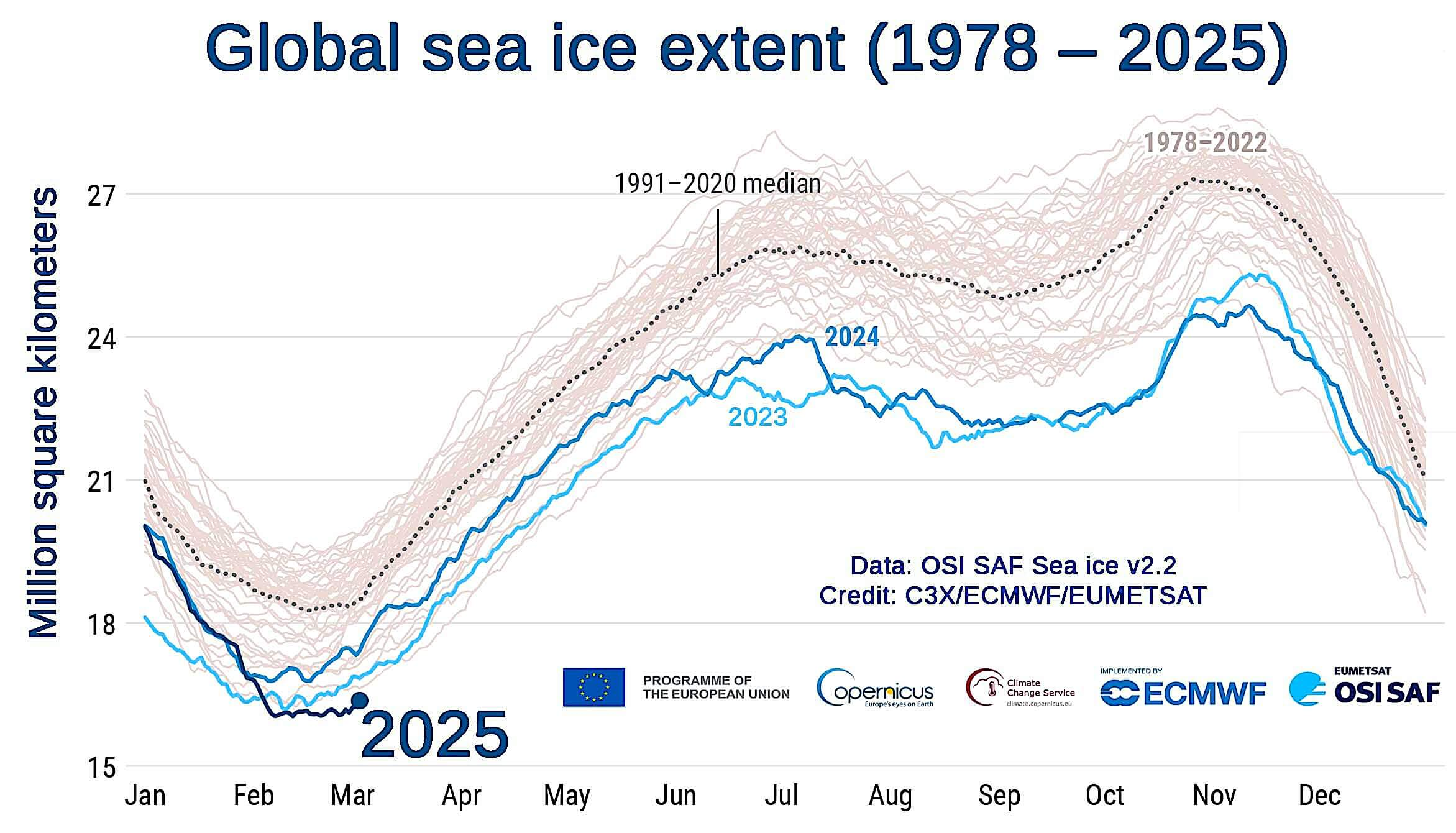
Global sea ice extent, which combines the sea ice extents in both polar regions, reached a new all-time minimum in February 2025.

Effects of climate change on sea ice vary with the seasons. Rates of ice loss, in the same month over years since 1979, are more than twice as great in September as in May.

Sea ice loss seen in March—at -2.2% per decade—is moderate compared to the extreme loss rates experienced in May and September (adjacent chart).

== Sea ice and climate ==
=== Effects of sea ice on climate ===
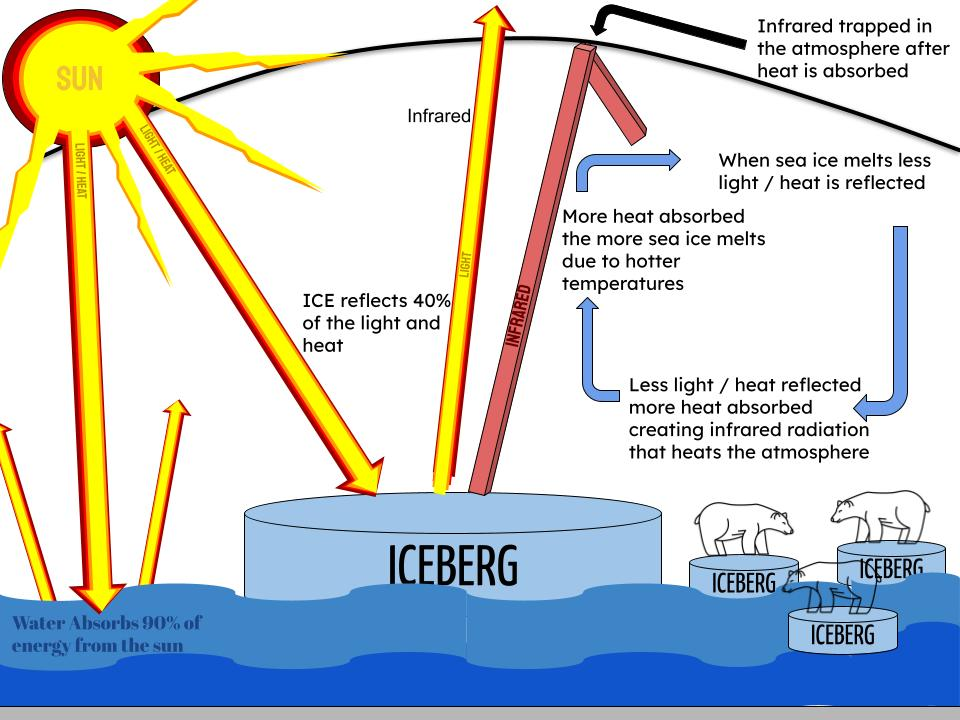
Loss of albedo due to sea ice melt creates a positive feedback loop that accelerates further warming.

Sea ice helps keep polar regions cool by reflecting incoming solar radiation due to its high albedo. This reflective surface prevents much of the Sun's energy from being absorbed by the darker ocean below. As sea ice melts, the exposed ocean absorbs more heat, further accelerating warming in a positive feedback loop known as the ice–albedo feedback.

Sea ice also influences global ocean circulation. When seawater freezes, most of the salt is excluded from the ice crystals, creating denser, saltier water beneath the ice. This dense water sinks and helps drive thermohaline circulation, a global "conveyor belt" of ocean currents that redistributes heat across the planet.

=== Effects of climate change on sea ice ===
The polar regions are among the most sensitive areas to climate change, with consequences for ecosystems, weather patterns, and global sea level. Rising global temperatures from human-caused greenhouse gas emissions have led to warming of the atmosphere and oceans, accelerating sea ice melt.

Although the melting of floating sea ice has a small effect on global average sea level (because sea ice is less salty and less dense than the seawater it displaces) it has large indirect effects on global climate systems. Loss of sea ice lowers the albedo of polar regions, amplifying warming and accelerating the melt of the Greenland and Antarctic ice sheets, which contributes substantially to sea level rise. Reduced sea ice alters ocean circulation and wave activity, which can enhance the erosion of coastal ice shelves and glaciers.

Melting sea ice also introduces large amounts of freshwater into the surface ocean. This reduces salinity, which can alter water density and influence global ocean circulation, including the Atlantic Meridional Overturning Circulation. These changes alter the transport of heat and nutrients, with consequences for marine ecosystems as well as regional and global climate patterns.

Change in extent of the Arctic Sea ice between April and August, in 2013

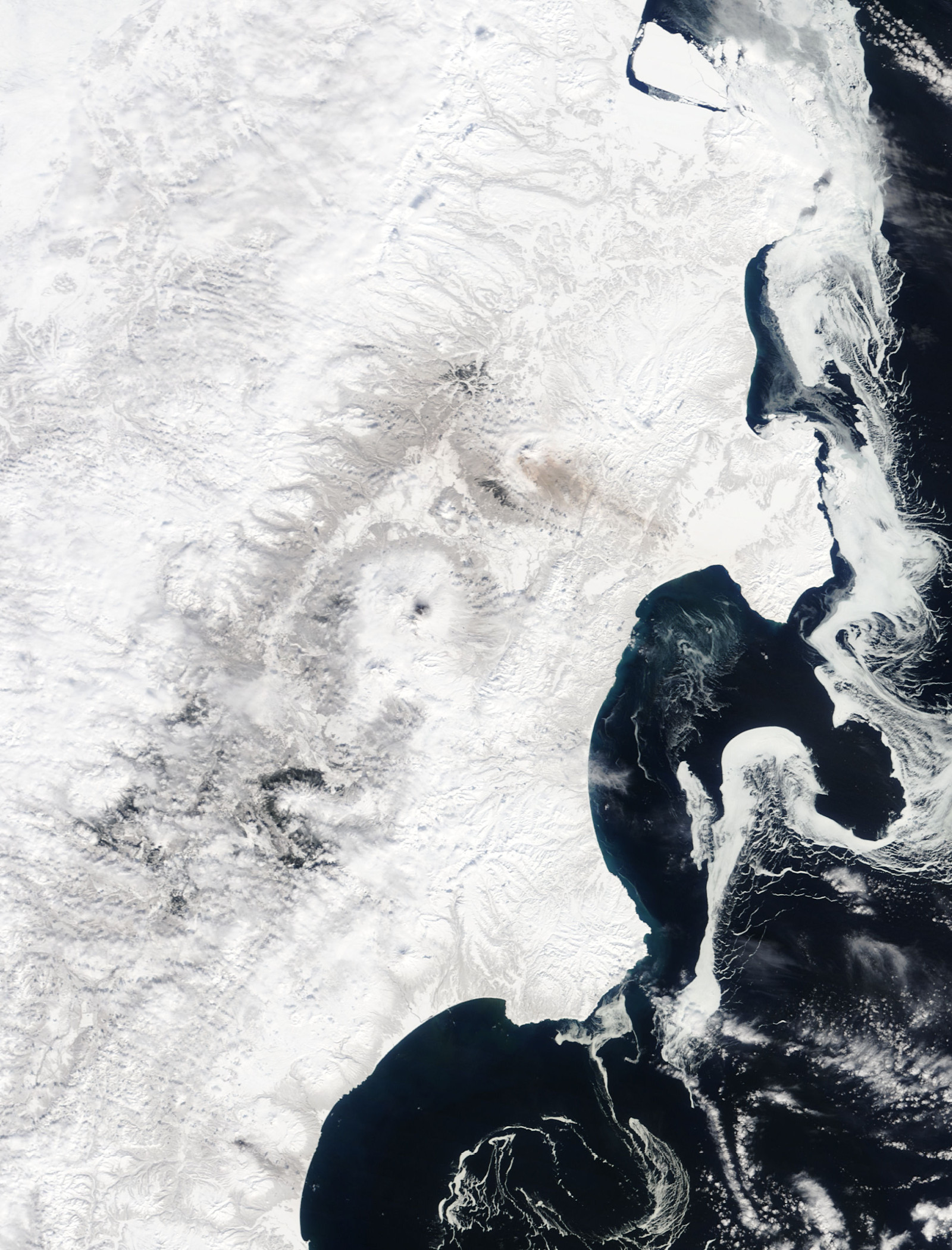
Sea ice imitates the shoreline along the Kamchatka Peninsula.

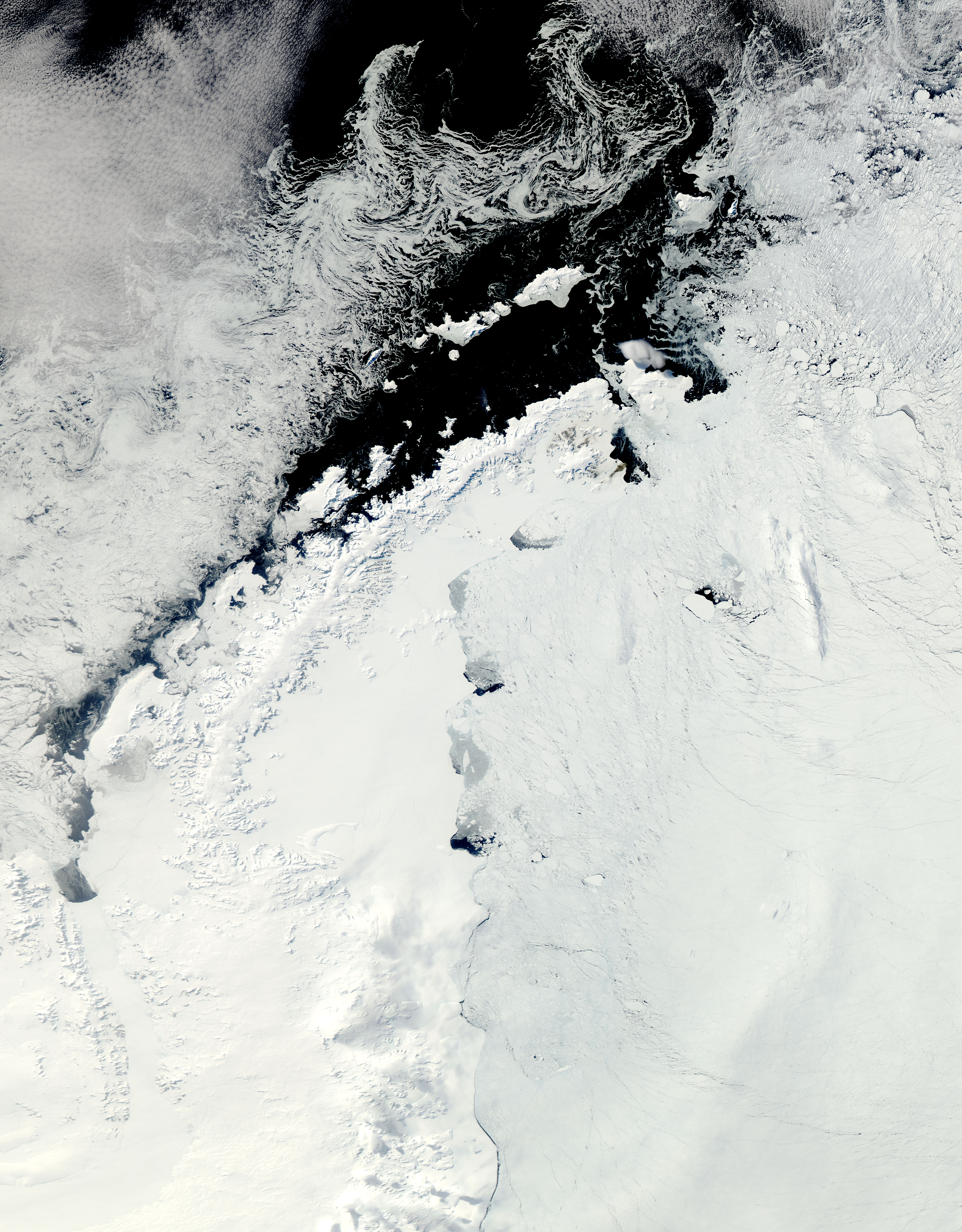
Clear view of the Antarctic Peninsula, the Larsen Ice Shelf and the sea ice-covered waters around the region

The Earth showing the annual minimum sea ice with a graph overlay showing the annual minimum sea ice area in millions of square kilometers

== Modelling ==
In order to gain a better understanding about the variability, numerical sea ice models are used to perform sensitivity studies. The two main ingredients are the ice dynamics and the thermodynamical properties (see Sea ice emissivity modelling, Sea ice growth processes and Sea ice thickness). There are many sea ice model computer codes available for doing this, including the CICE numerical suite.

Many global climate models (GCMs) have sea ice implemented in their numerical simulation scheme in order to capture the ice–albedo feedback correctly. Examples include:

- The Louvain-la-Neuve Sea Ice Model is a numerical model of sea ice designed for climate studies and operational oceanography developed at Université catholique de Louvain. It is coupled to the ocean general circulation model OPA (Ocean Parallélisé) and is freely available as a part of the Nucleus for European Modeling of the Ocean.
- The MIT General Circulation Model is a global circulation model developed at Massachusetts Institute of Technology includes a package for sea-ice. The code is freely available there.
- The University Corporation for Atmospheric Research develops the Community Sea Ice Model.
- CICE is run by the Los Alamos National Laboratory. The project is open source and designed as a component of GCM, although it provides a standalone mode.
- The Finite-Element Sea-Ice Ocean Model developed at Alfred Wegener Institute uses an unstructured grid.
- The neXt Generation Sea-Ice model (neXtSIM) is a Lagrangian model using an adaptive and unstructured triangular mesh and includes a new and unique class of rheological model called Maxwell-Elasto-Brittle to treat the ice dynamics. This model is developed at the Nansen Center in Bergen, Norway.

The Coupled Model Intercomparison Project offers a standard protocol for studying the output of coupled atmosphere-ocean general circulation models. The coupling takes place at the atmosphere-ocean interface where the sea ice may occur.

In addition to global modeling, various regional models deal with sea ice. Regional models are employed for seasonal forecasting experiments and for process studies.

== Ecology ==
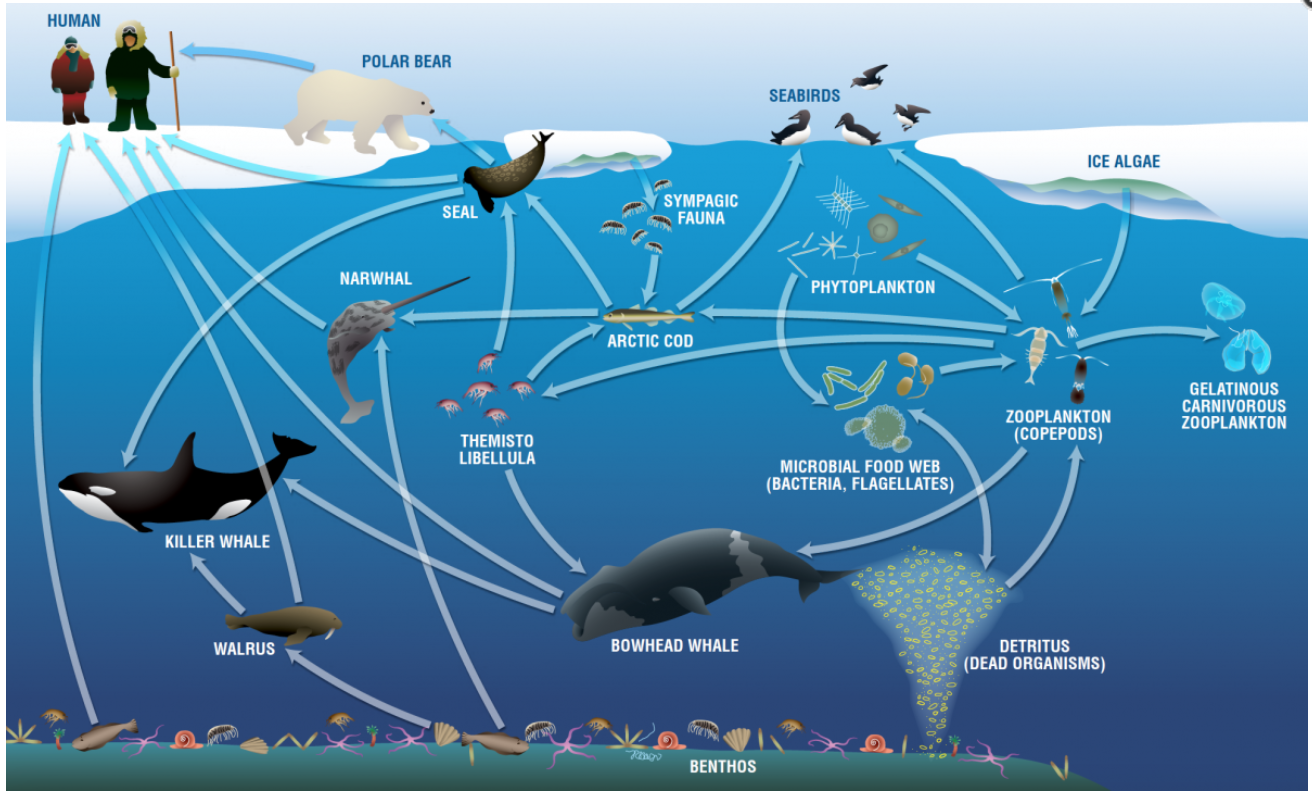
An Arctic food web

Sea ice provides a unique habitat within the Earth's biosphere. As seawater freezes, it traps pockets of brine, creating a network of channels and pores that host diverse communities of microorganisms, including bacteria, archaea, fungi, algae, protozoa, and viruses. These sympagic organisms form the base of food webs. Ice algae, in particular, are a critical food source for small invertebrates such as copepods and amphipods, which are consumed by larger animals including krill, fish and seabirds.

Life in sea ice must cope with extreme conditions. Temperatures inside the ice are below freezing, while brine channels are often saltier than seawater. For much of the year there is little or no sunlight, followed by months of continuous daylight in summer. Many organisms have evolved special strategies to adapt, such as producing antifreeze compounds, going dormant until light and nutrients return, or timing growth to the summer season.

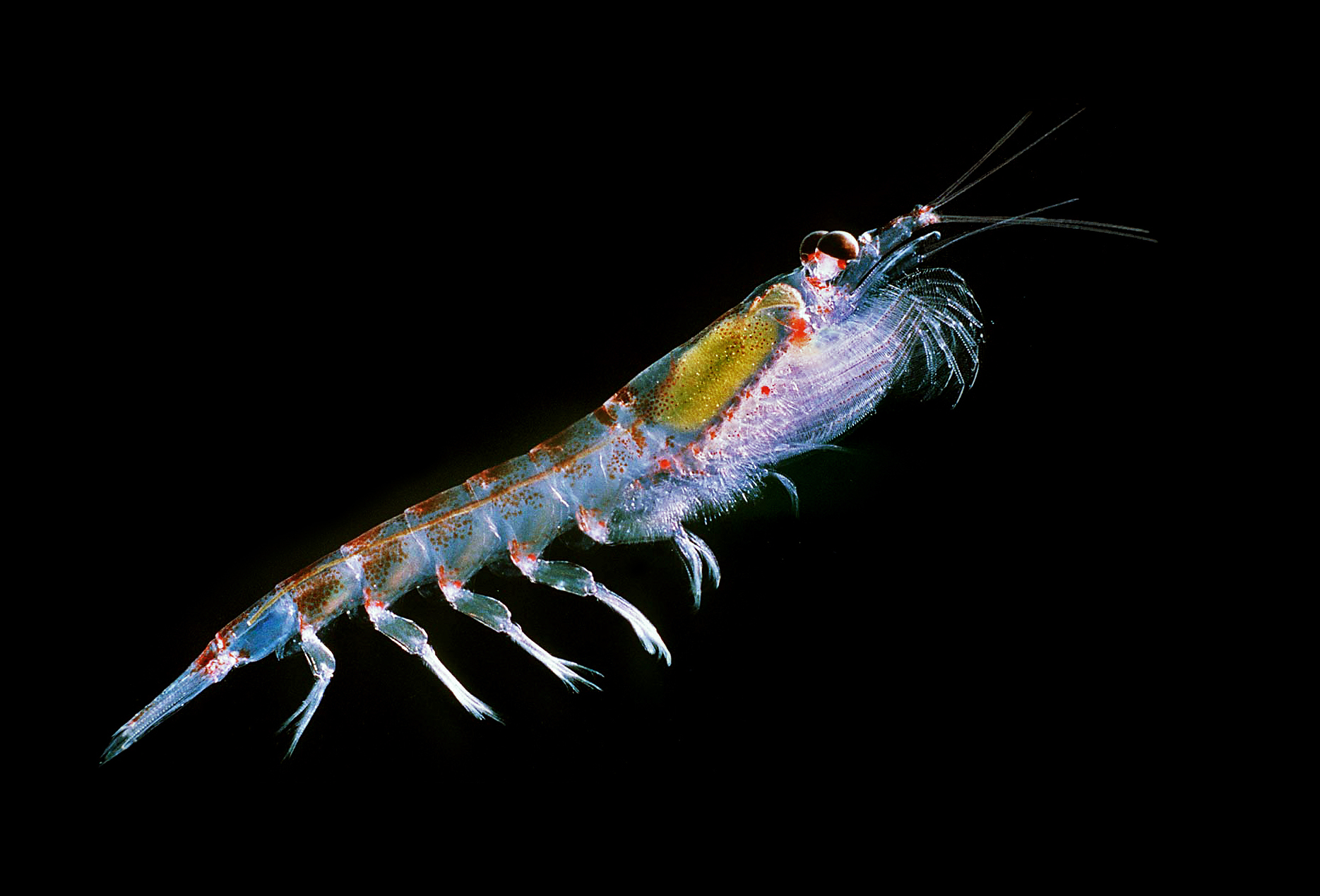
Antarctic krill are a keystone species, forming a crucial foundation of the Southern Ocean food web.

The ecology of sea ice is seasonal. In spring and summer, increasing light and melting ice stimulate algal growth, which is released into the water column. This seasonal pulse supports large phytoplankton blooms that fuel productivity across polar marine ecosystems. The timing and extent of sea ice melt therefore influences the availability of food for higher trophic levels.

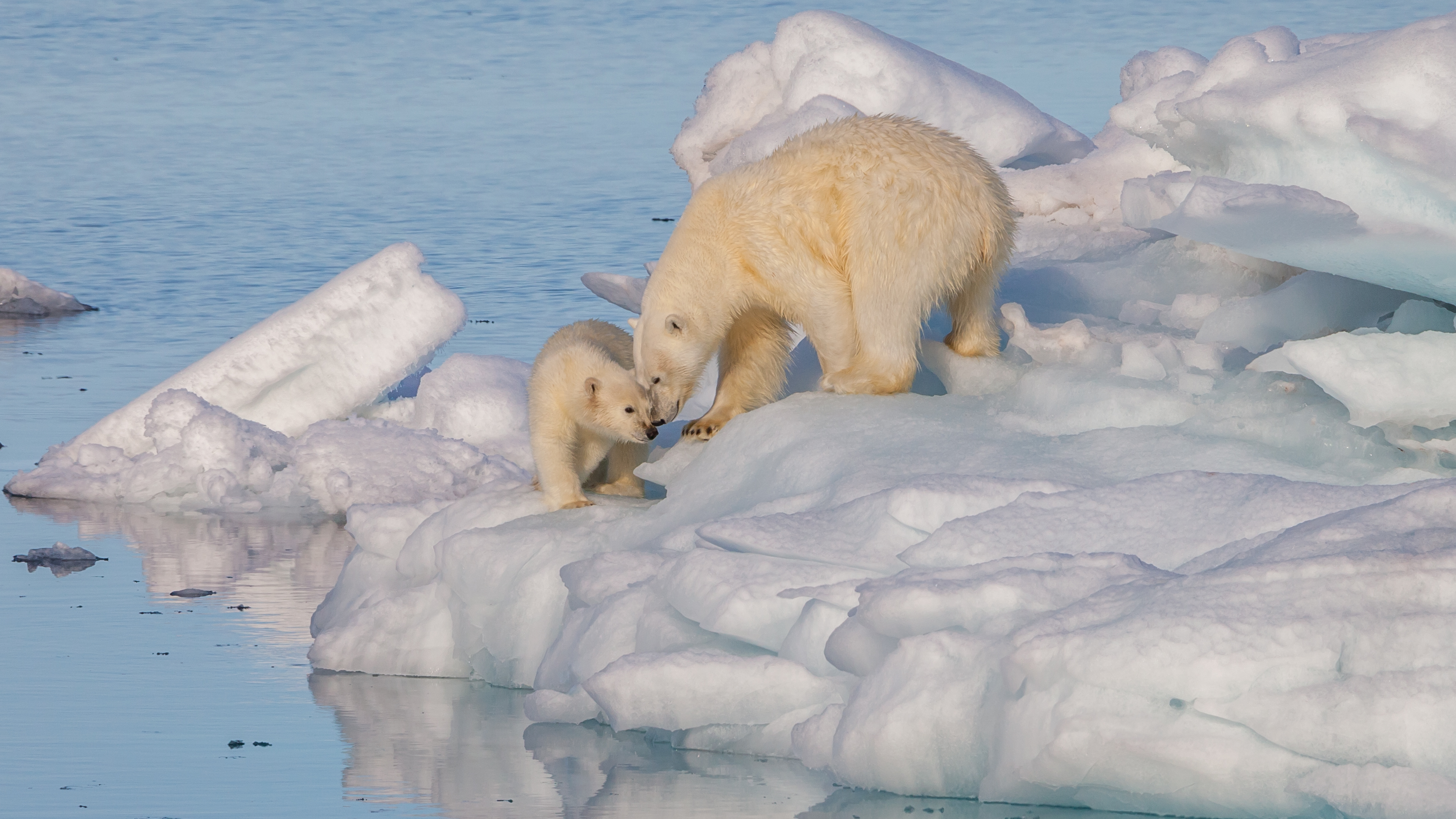
Polar bears are apex predators in the Arctic.

In the Southern Ocean, Antarctic krill rely on sea ice algae during their juvenile stages, forming the foundation of food webs that support fish, penguins, seals, and whales. In the Arctic, sea ice also hosts algae that sustain zooplankton which support fish, seals, walruses, and polar bears.

Sea ice also regulates biogeochemical processes. It stores and redistributes nutrients such as iron, and its seasonal melting influences ocean mixing and primary productivity. In this way, sea ice contributes to global carbon cycling and climate regulation.

Declines in sea ice extent and duration due to climate change pose significant ecological risks. Species that depend directly on sea ice for feeding, breeding, or resting are highly impacted. These include ringed seals and polar bears in the Arctic, and Emperor and Adélie penguins in Antarctica. Indirect impacts cascade through food webs, threatening the productivity and stability of entire polar ecosystems.

== Extraterrestrial presence ==
Other elements and compounds have been speculated to exist as oceans and seas on extraterrestrial planets. Scientists notably suspect the existence of "icebergs" of solid diamond and corresponding seas of liquid carbon on the ice giants, Neptune and Uranus. This is due to extreme pressure and heat at the core, that would turn carbon into a supercritical fluid.

== See also ==
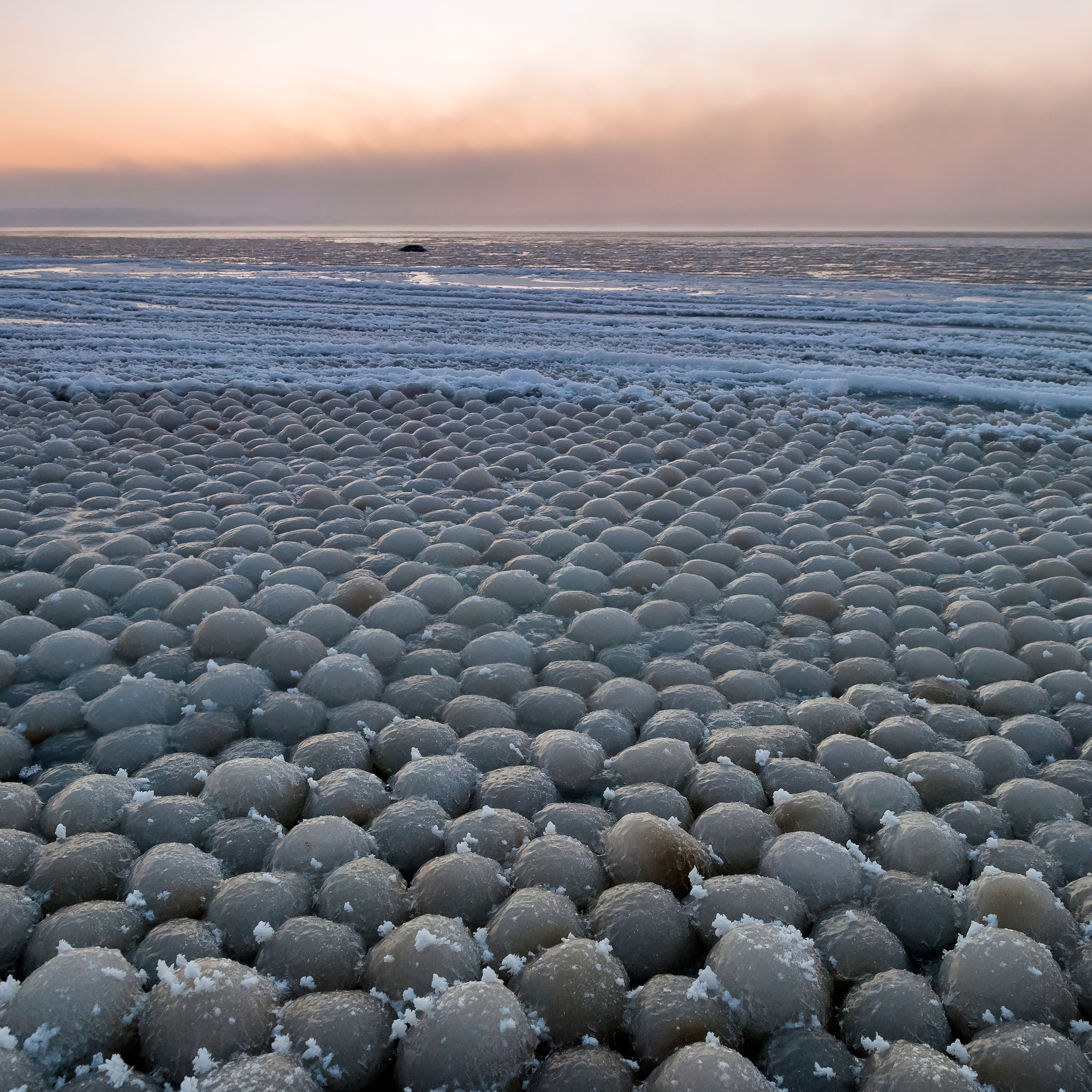
Rare phenomenon – the formation of ice eggs. Stroomi Beach, Tallinn, Estonia.

=== Ice types or features ===
- Anchor ice – Submerged ice anchored to a river bottom or seafloor
- Congelation ice – Ice that forms on the bottom of an established ice cover
- Drift ice – Sea ice that is not attached to land
- Fast ice – Sea ice connected to the coastline
- Finger rafting – Compression overlapping of floating ice cover in alternating overthrusts and underthrusts
- Frazil ice – Collections of ice crystals in open water
- Grease ice – Stage in the formation of sea ice
- Iceberg – Large formation of floating ice
- Ice mélange – Mixture of sea ice types, icebergs, and snow without a clearly defined floe
- Ice volcano – Wave-driven mound of ice formed on terrestrial lakes
- Lead (sea ice) – Fracture that opens up in an expanse of sea ice
- Pancake ice – Form of ice on bodies of water consisting of round pieces
- Polynya – Area of unfrozen sea within an ice pack
- Pressure ridge (ice) – Linear accumulation of ice blocks resulting from the convergence between floes
- Rotten ice – Melting or otherwise disintegrating ice on open water
- Seabed gouging by ice – Outcome of the interaction between drifting ice and the seabed
- Slush – Mixture of snow and liquid water
- Stamukha – Static accumulation of sea ice rubble
- Sastrugi, also known as Zastruga – Sharp irregular grooves or ridges formed on a snow surface
- False bottom – Form of sea ice formed underwater between meltwater and seawater

=== Physics and chemistry ===
- Decline of sea ice – Sea ice loss in recent decades in the Arctic Ocean
- Ice – Frozen water; the solid state of water
- Ice crystals – Water ice in symmetrical shapes
- Ice Ih – States of matter for water as a solid
- Sea ice growth processes
- Seawater – Water from a sea or an ocean

=== Applied sciences and engineering endeavours ===
- Drift ice station – Research stations built on the ice of the high latitudes of the Arctic Ocean
- Ice class – Ship classification
- Icebreaker – Ship that is able to navigate through ice-covered waters
- Ice navigation – Specialist area of navigation
- Measurement of sea ice – Records made for navigational safety and environmental monitoring
- Sea ice concentration – Area of sea ice relative to the total area at a given point in the ocean
- Sea ice emissivity modelling
- Sea ice thickness – Measurement of the spatial extent of sea ice
- Zhubov scale – Scale for reporting polar sea ice coverage
- CICE (sea ice model) – Computer model that simulates sea ice

=== Other ===
- Vladimir Vize - Russian Arctic ice pack scientist
