= Pancake ice =

Form of ice on bodies of water consisting of round pieces

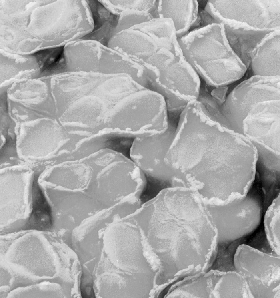
Pancake ice

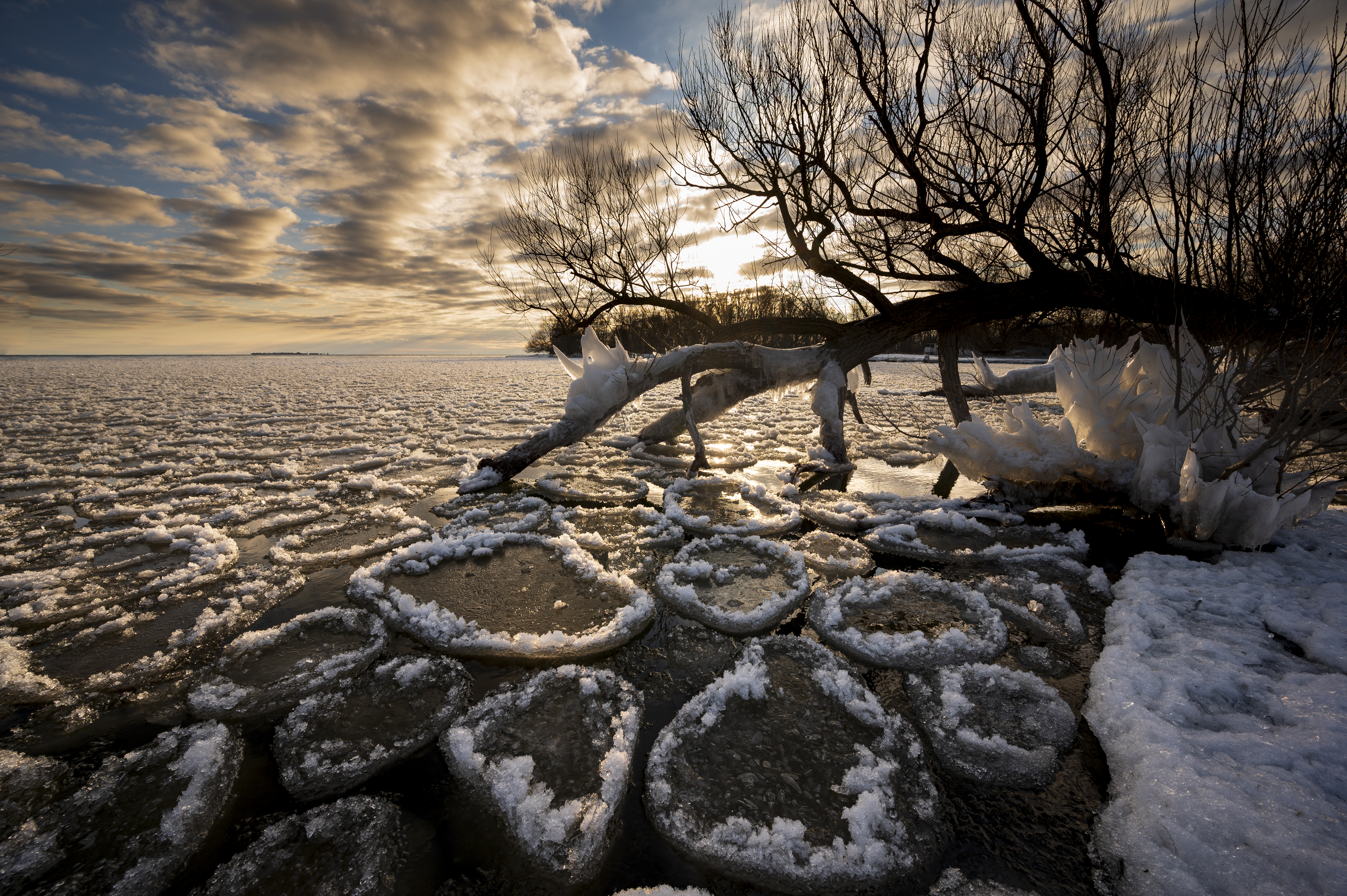
Pancake ice near a willow tree

Pancake ice is a form of sea ice or freshwater ice that consists of round pieces of ice with diameters ranging from 30 centimetres (12 in) to 3 metres (9.8 ft) and thicknesses up to 10 centimetres (3.9 inches), depending on the local conditions. It forms as a result of wave action on slush or ice rind.

== Characteristics ==
Pancake ice features elevated rims formed by piling of frazil ice or slush onto the edges of pancakes when they collide, both due to random bumping into each other and because of periodic compressions at wave troughs. These rims are the first indication of the onset of the formation of the pancake ice from less consolidated forms of ice.

== Formation ==
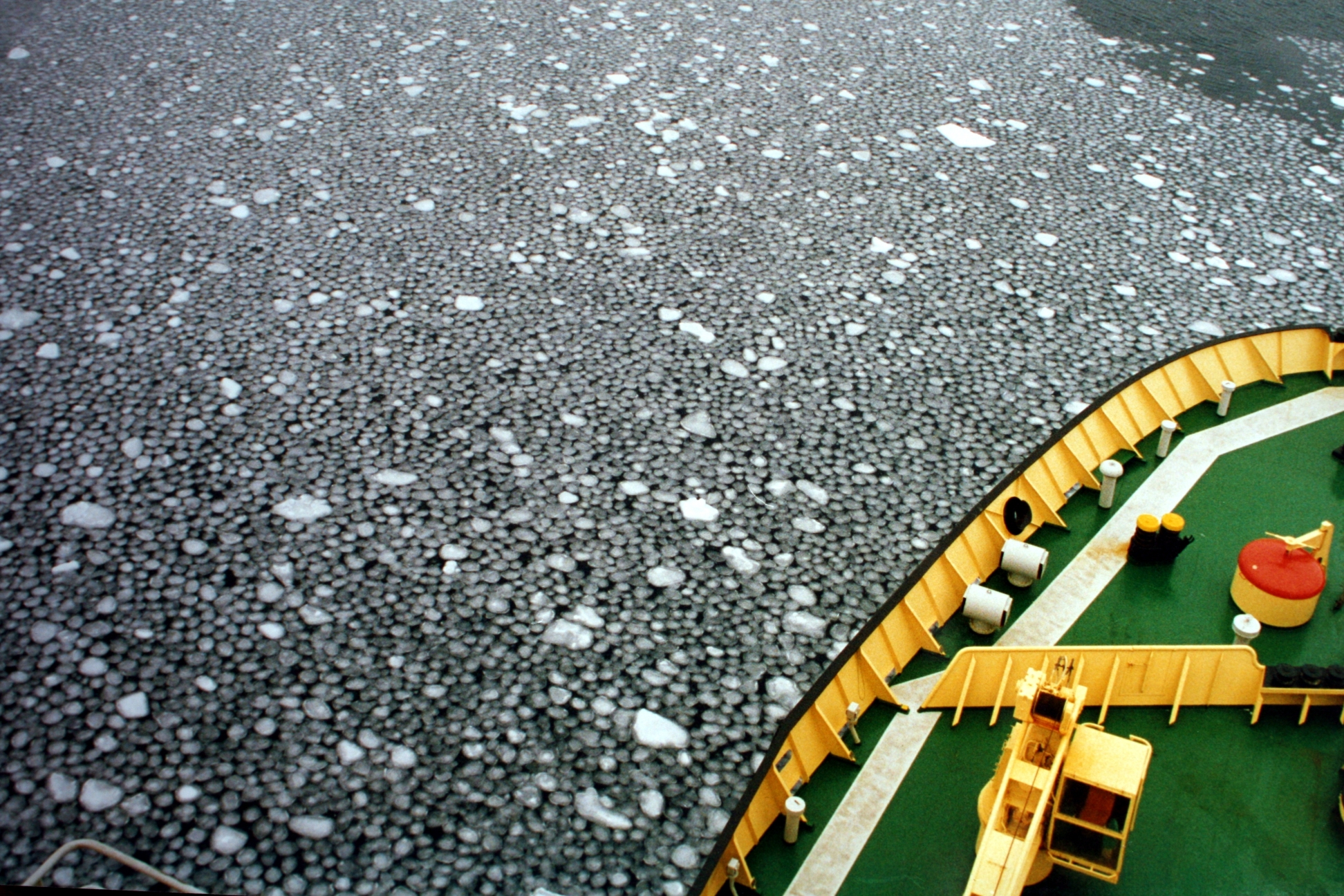
Pancake ice in the Ross Sea

Pancake ice forms in conditions of high wave activity, in contrast to other types of sea ice formed under calm conditions. Pancake ice can form in two processes: (1) on water covered to some degree in slush, shuga or grease ice, or (2) from breaking of ice rind, nilas or even gray ice in agitated conditions. If the waves are strong enough, pancakes can raft over each other, creating an uneven top and bottom surface on the ice. At this point, the pancake ice will fuse together and amalgamate into an ice floe. This ice floe will continue to grow over the winter. This process increases pancake ice's resilience, resulting in characteristic length scales less than ocean wavelengths and causing waves passing through pancake ice not to scatter.

== Examples ==
=== Arctic Ocean ===
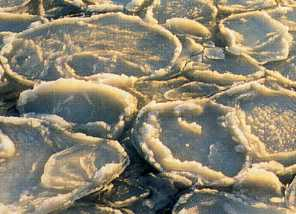
Pancake ice in the western part of the Baltic Sea

A notable example of pancake ice occurs in the Arctic Ocean, where a new prevalence of pancake ice is occurring, particularly along the ice edge, as a result of increasing Arctic wave activity.
