= Shuga (ice) =

Spongy, porridgy body of ice suspended in water

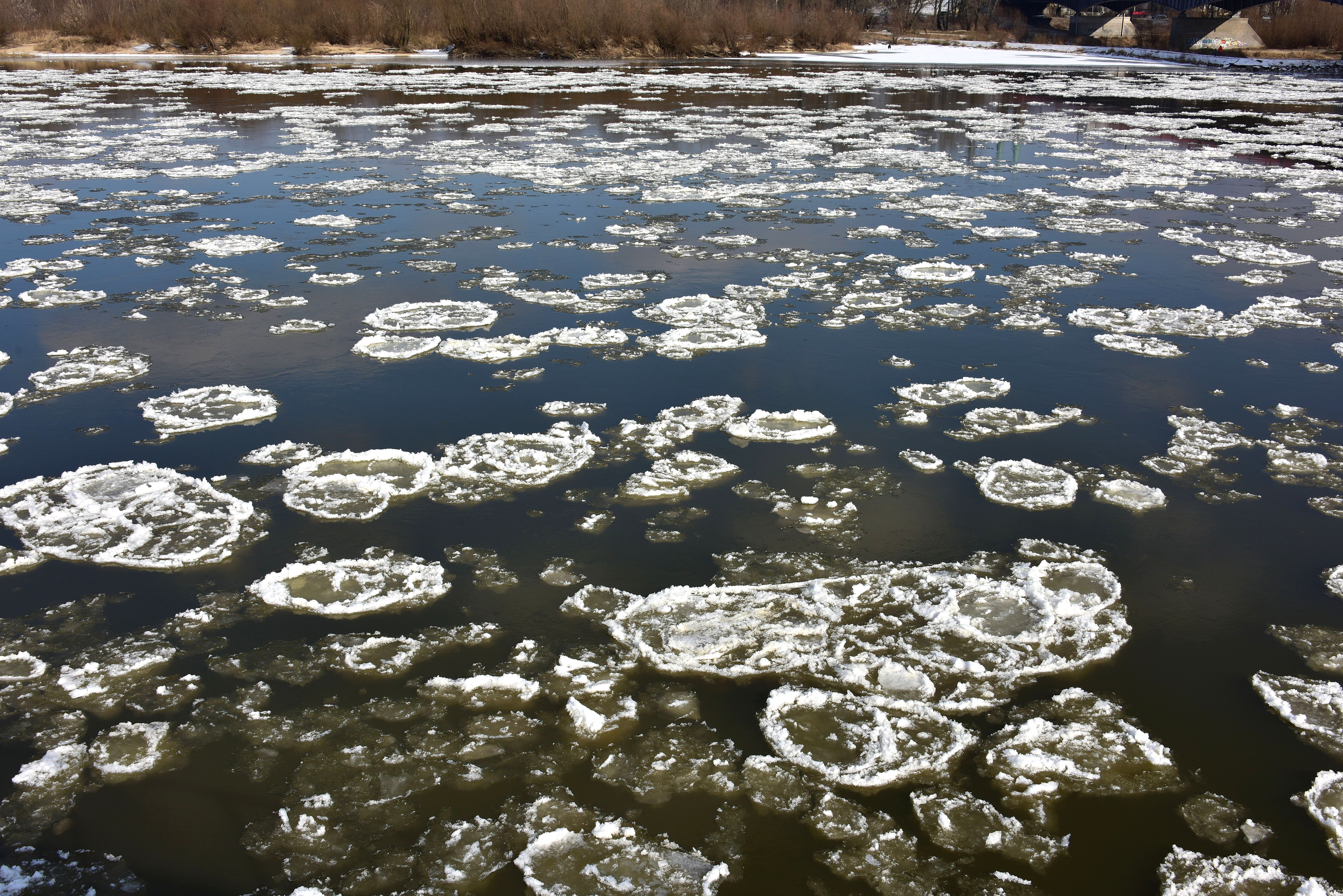
Shuga on Vistula river

Shuga is a spongy, porridgy body of ice suspended in water. It may be formed from grease ice or from anchor ice rising to the surface and typically comprises lumps of ice, a few centimeters across.

Shuga is the third stage in the development of sea ice, formed as a result of snow falling on frazil ice to become grease ice which is then further worked by subsequent wind and wave action. As cooling continues, the next stage is reached when sheets of rind or nilas ice emerge. Shuga may also occur in freshwater situations.

== Bibliography ==
- Armstrong, Terence, Brian Roberts and Charles Swithinbank (1973). Illustrated Glossary of Snow of Ice. Cambridge: Scott Polar Research Institute.
- Hince, Bernadette (2000).
