= Ice volcano =

Wave-driven mound of ice formed on terrestrial lakes

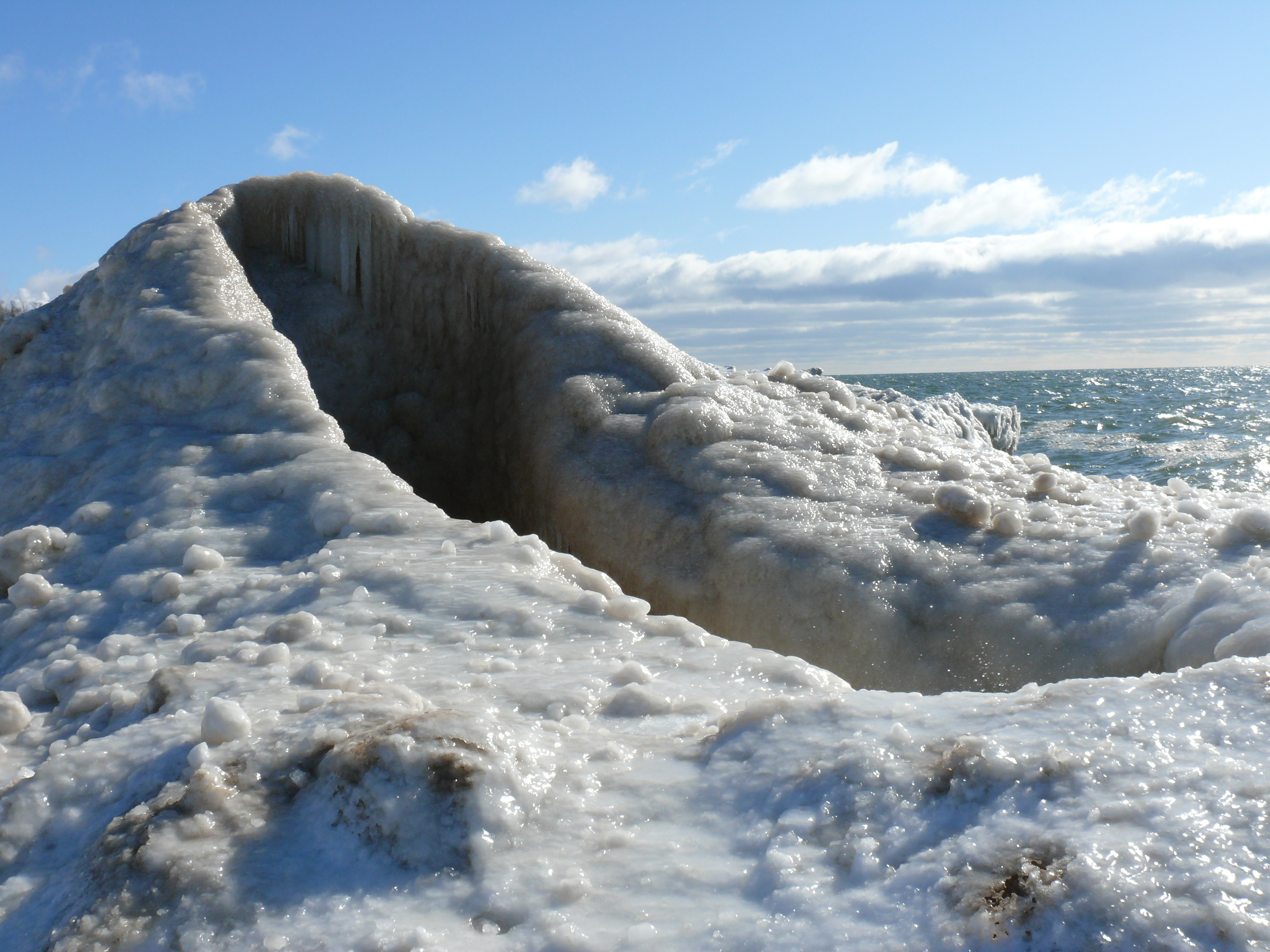
An ice volcano over Lake Michigan

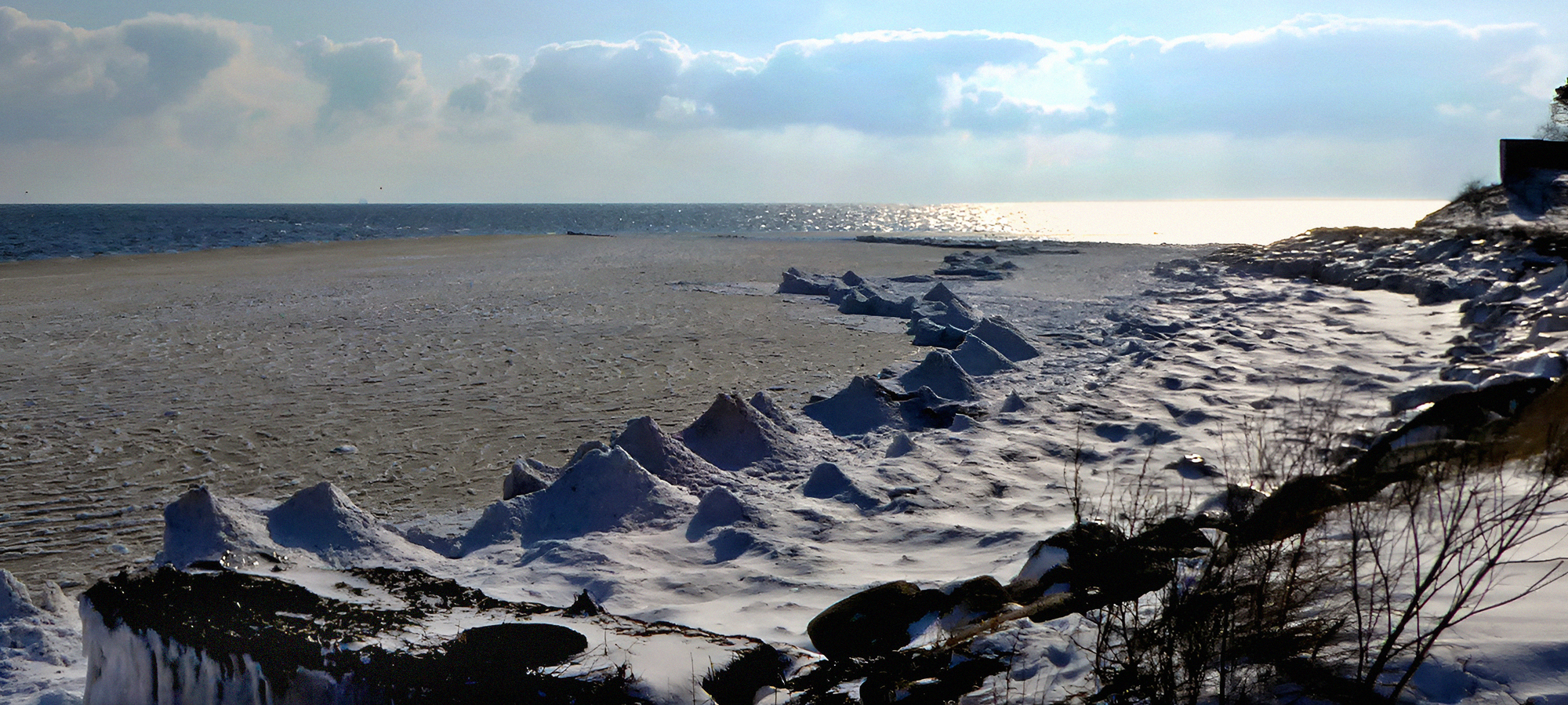
Ice volcanoes in Ystad, Sweden, 2018

An ice volcano is a conical mound of ice formed over a terrestrial lake via the eruption of water and slush through an ice shelf. The process is wave-driven, with wind providing the energy for the waves to cut through the ice and create formations that loosely mimic the shape and activity of volcanoes. After being ejected into the atmosphere, the liquid water and slush freeze and fall back to the surface, growing the formation. Ice may also be erupted. The phenomenon is most often observed along the southern coast of Lake Erie and Lake Ontario, when the temperature is below freezing and the wind blows onshore with a velocity of at least 25 mph (40 km/h). They are known to reduce coastal erosion there. The formations are temporary: they are frequently destroyed by storms and warm weather, and once the lake wholly freezes over, eruptions are no longer possible.

There is no consensus name for this phenomenon. Due to its visual similarity to volcanism and particularly cryovolcanism, the term "ice volcano" is frequently used, but it remains controversial. Unlike geysers and related structures, ice volcanoes are not hydrothermal.

The uplifts may attract a number of visitors, but they are dangerous, and experts warn that people may fall through the ice or slip into the cold lake. Ice volcanoes are used by snowy owls as hunting platforms to search for waterfowl.

== Formation ==
These features are distinct from pressure ridges, which are uplifts formed by the compression of ice against a shoreline or another floe. Instead, ice volcanoes are created by waves colliding with irregularities at the edge of an ice sheet. The abnormalities concentrate the wave energy in a small area, where the ice is eroded to form a V-shaped channel. Spray, ice, and slush splashing out of the feature create a volcanic cone at the channel's shoreward end. This process takes only a few hours. The lakeward end of the channel may then be sealed by ice, but the volcano may continue to erupt. A wave amplitude of at least one metre (3 ft 3 in) is needed to induce eruptions, so ice volcanoes are rarely active without storm-force winds. Formation near land is suppressed by reefs and shoals, which absorb the wave energy needed for the phenomenon. Nonetheless, they may produce larger cones further out at sea, where the greater depth makes this possible. Formation is more thoroughly suppressed by powerful storms, which erode the ice too fast for mound creation.

One type of ice volcano, known as a "cold spot", does not require waves to break against the edge of an ice shelf. Instead, water and slush erupt through a region of weak ice near the coast and form a mound. This is analogous to a geological hotspot.

== Appearance and eruptions ==
Landfast ice is required, so the volcanoes normally form near land. They are found in successive rows, and within one row, the features usually have equal height and spacing. However, when comparing two rows, the height and spacing may be drastically different. Ice volcanoes range in height from less than one meter to ten meters, with the largest ones located far from the shore. Eruptions over ten meters high have been observed, but it is believed that the height of the eruptions are proportional to the size of the mounds. A single eruption may increase the height of the volcano by several centimeters. When an eruption occurs above 0 °C (32 °F), however, the water erodes the uplift instead of expanding it. Spacing is determined by the amplitude and direction of the waves. In general, the appearance and number of ice volcanoes change considerably between winters.

Different types of ice volcanoes have been compared to shield volcanoes and stratovolcanoes. They are noted for their symmetry. Cold spot volcanoes are particularly symmetrical, but their eruption has not been observed.
