= Congelation ice =

Ice that forms on the bottom of an established ice cover

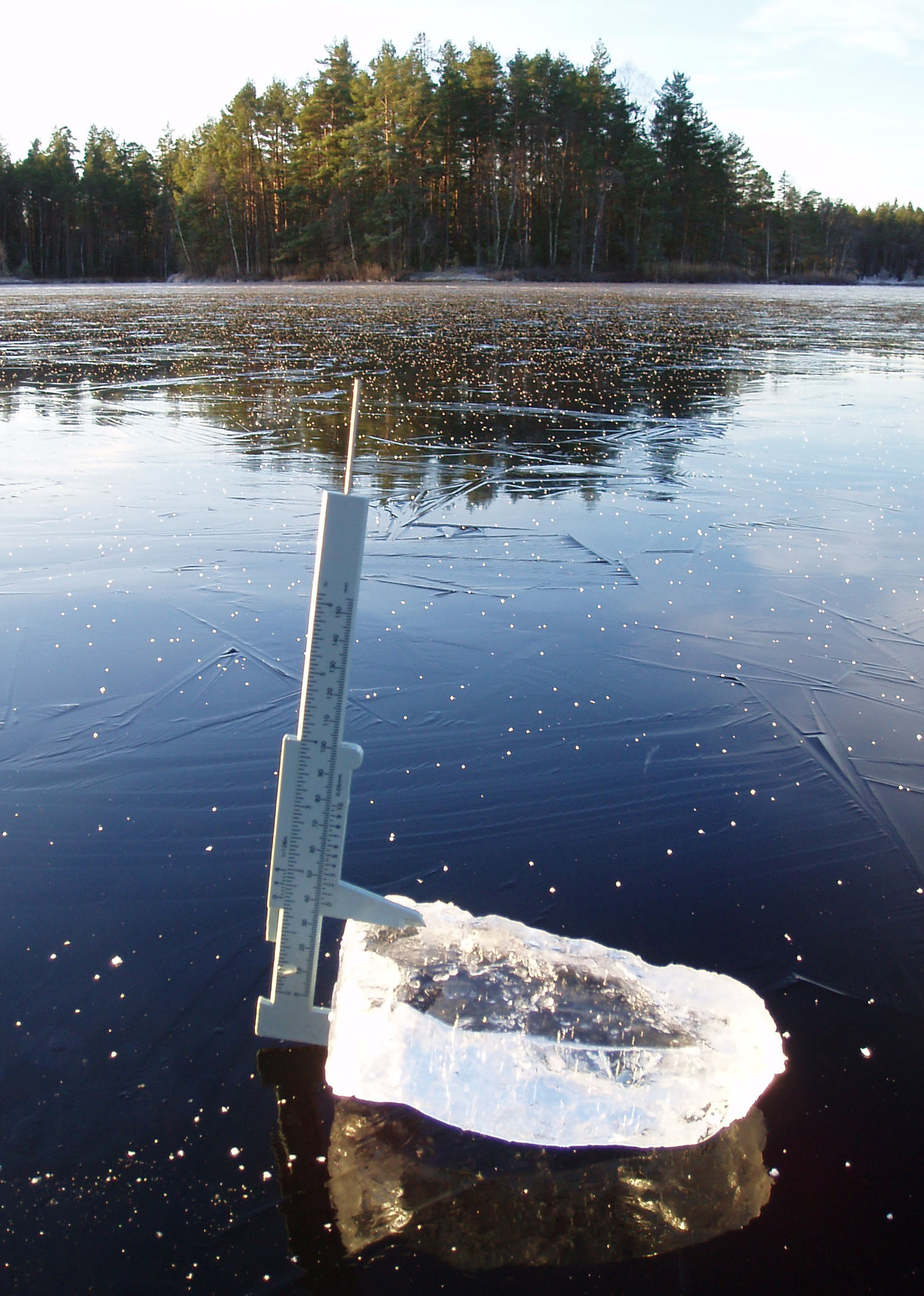
39 mm newly formed clear ice on a lake in Sweden

Congelation ice is ice that forms on the bottom of an established ice cover.

== Seawater ==
On seawater, congelation ice is ice that forms on the bottom of an established sea ice cover, usually in the form of platelets which coalesce to form solid ice.

Only the water freezes to ice, the salt from the seawater is concentrated into brine, some of which is contained in pockets in the new ice. Due to the brine pockets, congelation ice on seawater is neither as hard nor as transparent as fresh water ice.

== Fresh water ==
On the surface of lakes, or other bodies of still freshwater, congelation ice is often called black Ice. This ice has frozen without many air bubbles trapped inside, making it transparent. Its transparency reveals the colour, usually black, of the water beneath it, hence the name. This is in contrast to snow ice, sometimes called slush ice, which is formed, when slush (water saturated snow) refreezes. Snow ice is white due to the presence of air bubbles.

Black ice grows downward from the bottom of the existing ice surface. The growth rate of the ice is proportional to the rate that heat is transferred from the water below the ice surface to the air above the ice surface. The total ice thickness can be approximated from Stefan's equation.

Black ice is very hard, strong and smooth, which makes it ideal for ice skating, skate sailing, ice yachting and some other ice sports.

Thin, clear ice also has acoustic properties which are useful to tour skaters. Skating on clear ice radiates a tone whose frequency depends on the thickness of the ice.
