= Stamukha =

Static accumulation of sea ice rubble

Stamukhi are made of broken sea ice resulting from the interaction between fast ice and drifting pack ice.

A stamukha (plural: stamukhi; from Russian стамуха) is a grounded accumulation of sea ice rubble that typically develops along the boundary between fast ice and the drifting pack ice, or becomes incorporated into the fast ice.- see also NSIDC. It is a pressure ridge. Wind, currents and tides contribute to this phenomenon. Stamukhi tend to occur in belts that are parallel to the shoreline, along coastal shoals, at water depths of about 20 m (65 ft), but that can reach 50 m (160 ft). They can build up to heights 10 metres (33 ft) or more above the waterline. Although they remain pinned to the seabed, these features can be subject to small displacements, either due to thermal expansion or to the pressure exerted by the drifting pack ice onto the fast ice. Because stamukhi tend to be deeply grounded, they may occur as isolated ice features in the open sea during the summer season, after the surrounding ice has melted away.

Since stamukhi extend downward into the seabed, they present a risk to submarine pipelines and telecommunications cables that cross the shoreline. Seabed penetration by the ice can reach a depth of 5 metres (16 ft).
