= Anchor ice =

Submerged ice anchored to a river bottom or seafloor

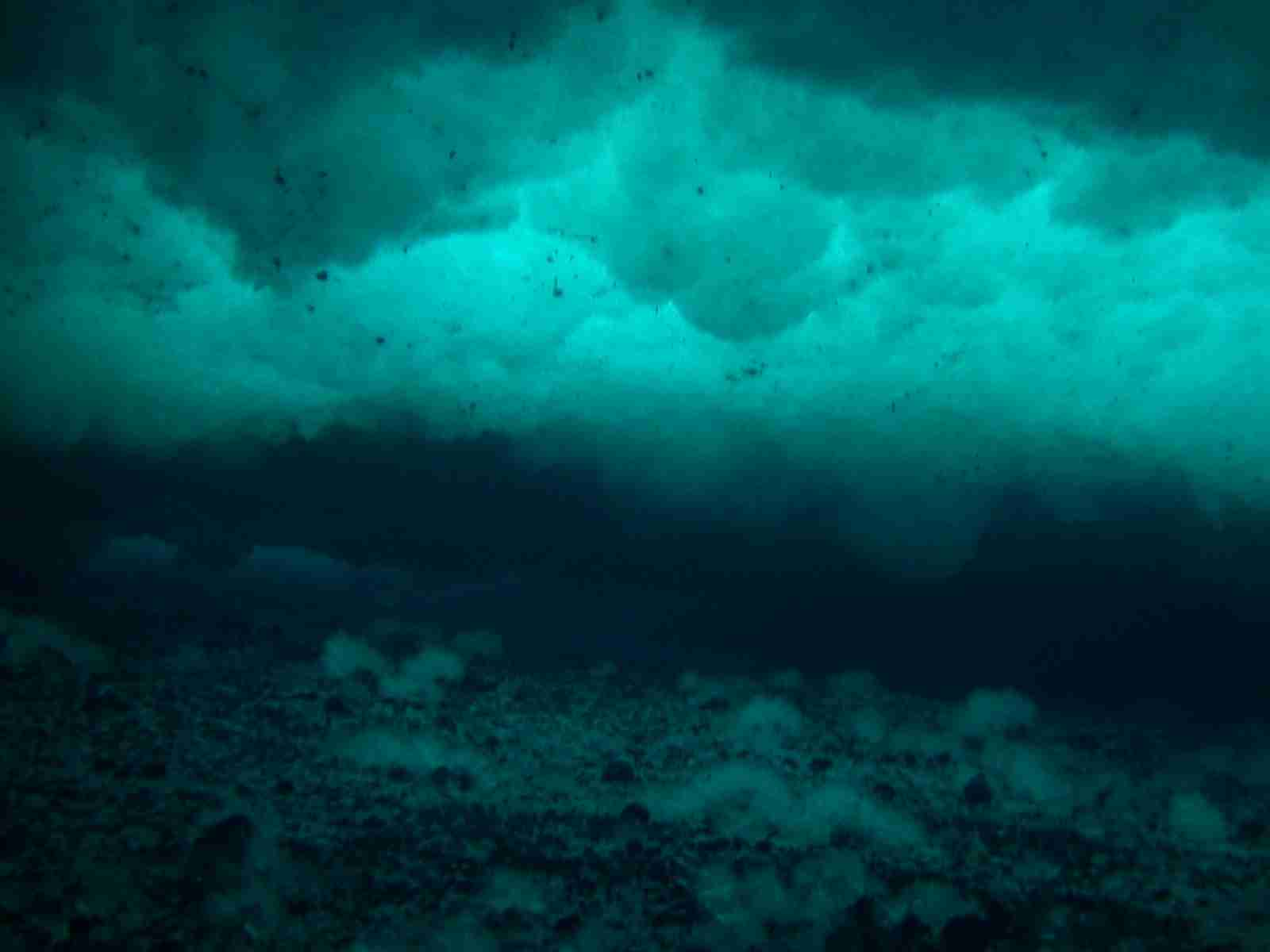
Anchor ice growing on the sea floor in McMurdo Sound, Antarctica

Anchor ice is defined by the World Meteorological Organization as "submerged ice attached or anchored to the bottom, irrespective of the nature of its formation". It may also be called bottom-fast ice. Anchor ice is most commonly observed in fast-flowing rivers during periods of extreme cold, at the mouths of rivers flowing into very cold seawater, in the shallow sub or intertidal during or after storms when the air temperature is below the freezing point of the water, and the subtidal in the Antarctic along ice shelves or near floating glacier tongues, and in shallow lakes.

== Types and formation ==
=== In rivers ===
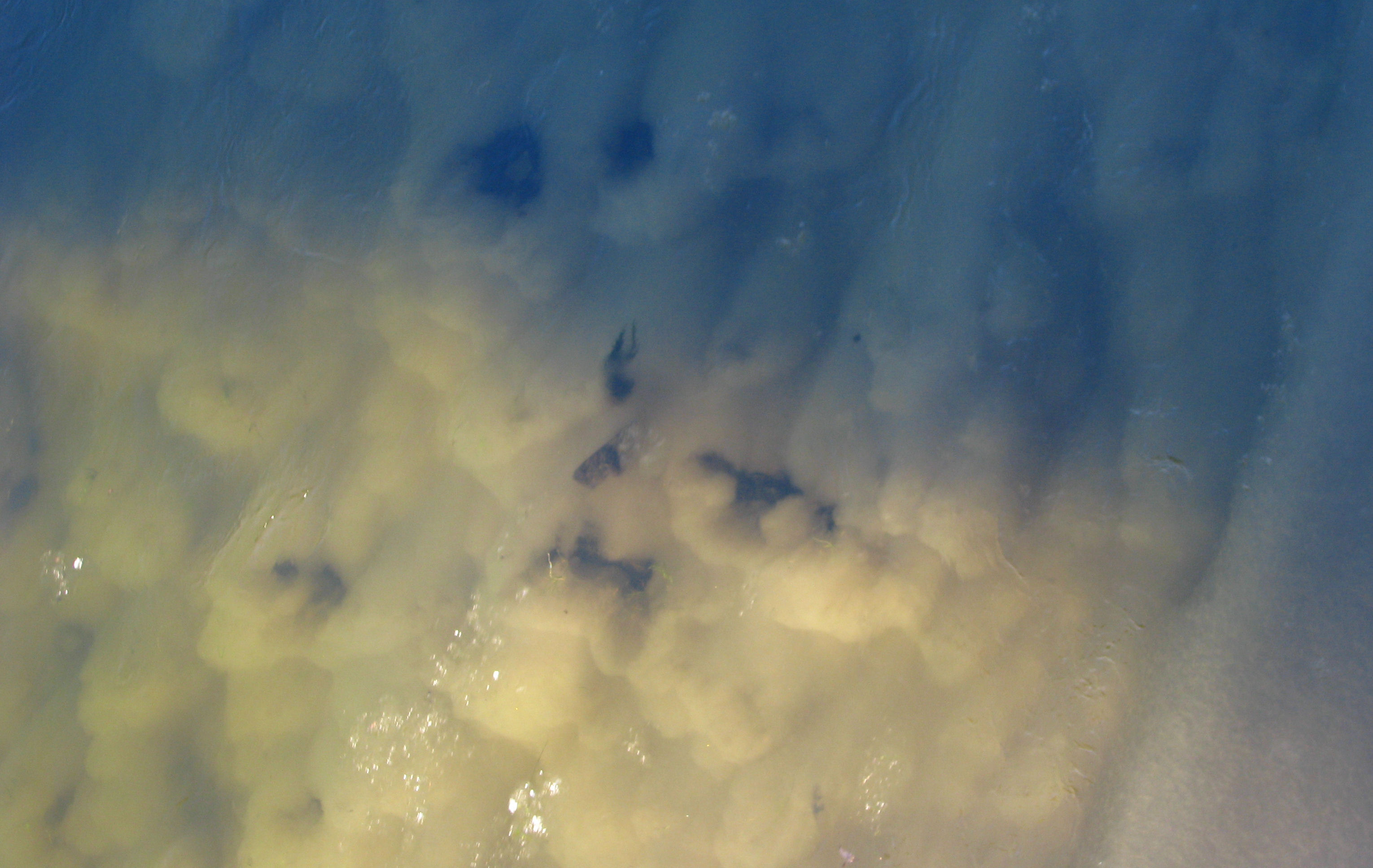
Anchor ice on the ground of river Saale in Jena, Germany

Anchor ice will generally form in fast-flowing rivers during periods of extreme cold. Due to the motion of the water, ice cover may not form consistently, and the water will quickly reach its freezing point due to mixing and contact with the atmosphere. Ice platelets generally form very quickly in the water column and on submerged objects once conditions are optimal for anchor ice formation. Anchor ice in rivers tends to be composed of numerous small crystals adhering to each other in small flocculent masses. Anchor ice in rivers can seriously disrupt hydro-electric power plants by significantly reducing flow or stopping turbines completely.

Another form of anchor ice may be observed at the mouths of Arctic rivers where fresh water seeps out of the river bed into the ocean up through the sediment. Anchor ice forms if the seawater is below the freezing point of the river water.

=== In lakes ===
Shallow tundra lakes may feature anchor ice with a specific behavior. Lakes in the southwestern part of Nunavut, Canada typically freeze down to the bottom when the water level is low. On some cases spring meltwater flows into the lake under the ice cover, which becomes domed leaving a depressed "racetrack" ring around the shore where meltwater accumulates as well. The ice cover remains bottom-fast until the buoyancy force exceeds the freezing bond. At the latter moment the ice cover abruptly breaks off the bottom to form a flat sheet. In other cases the anchor ice becomes completely submerged into the meltwater and holes may be melted throughout the ice sheet. When the sheet finally lifts off the bottom, the meltwater accumulated at the surface is jetted through these holes with enough force to create small craters in the lake bottom where it is soft (sand or silt). This downward jet phenomenon was previously described for deltas into the Beaufort Sea, where they were caused by periodic tidal buoyancy of holed ice.

=== Formed during storms ===
Anchor ice may be formed in the shallow intertidal or subtidal during storms in cold weather, when the uppermost layers of the water column are churned up by strong winds or waves. This type of anchor ice can be found primarily in the Arctic, where submerged ice may be observed to completely cover the substrate to depths of up to 2m, with some anchor ice cover observed at more than 4.5m depth.

=== In the Antarctic ===
Antarctic anchor ice is perhaps one of the most interesting phenomena of ice formation in the marine environment. The general mechanism of its formation is commonly assumed as the following:

- Antarctic surface waters are forced to flow below a large, thick mass of floating ice (ice shelf or glacier tongue) due to tidal motions or normal ocean circulation.
- The surface water melts the underside of the mass of ice, causing a slight freshening of the water that brings the temperature of the water into equilibrium with the in-situ freezing point at depth.
- The water, at its freezing point at depth (slightly lower than the freezing point at the surface due to the pressure effect on the freezing point), is advected from under the floating mass of ice and may rise towards the surface due to a variety of factors.
- As the water rises the in-situ freezing point increases, leaving the water slightly supercooled. Supercooling is relieved by the formation of microscopic ice crystals in the water column.
- Ice crystals may coalesce or adhere to submerged objects, including marine organisms, rocks, man-made structures, or other ice formations such as the sea ice, the ice foot, floating glaciers or icebergs.

Anchor ice crystals in the Antarctic are generally in the form of thin, circular platelets of 2–10 cm in diameter. Large masses of irregularly-oriented crystals form anchor ice formations, which may be as large as 4m in diameter when attached to large immovable objects on the sea floor.

Anchor ice that forms on the underside of sea ice is often referred to as platelet or congelation ice, and can be hard to distinguish from that formed due to the cooling of the sea ice cover by cold atmospheric conditions.

Anchor ice is thought to be relatively common in the Antarctic, due to large ice shelves that occupy many areas of the continental coast. Studies and observations of anchor ice formation in McMurdo Sound, Antarctica have shown that the phenomenon regularly causes the formation of ice on the seafloor to depths of approximately 15m, and rarely to depths of approximately 30m.

Anchor ice in Antarctica

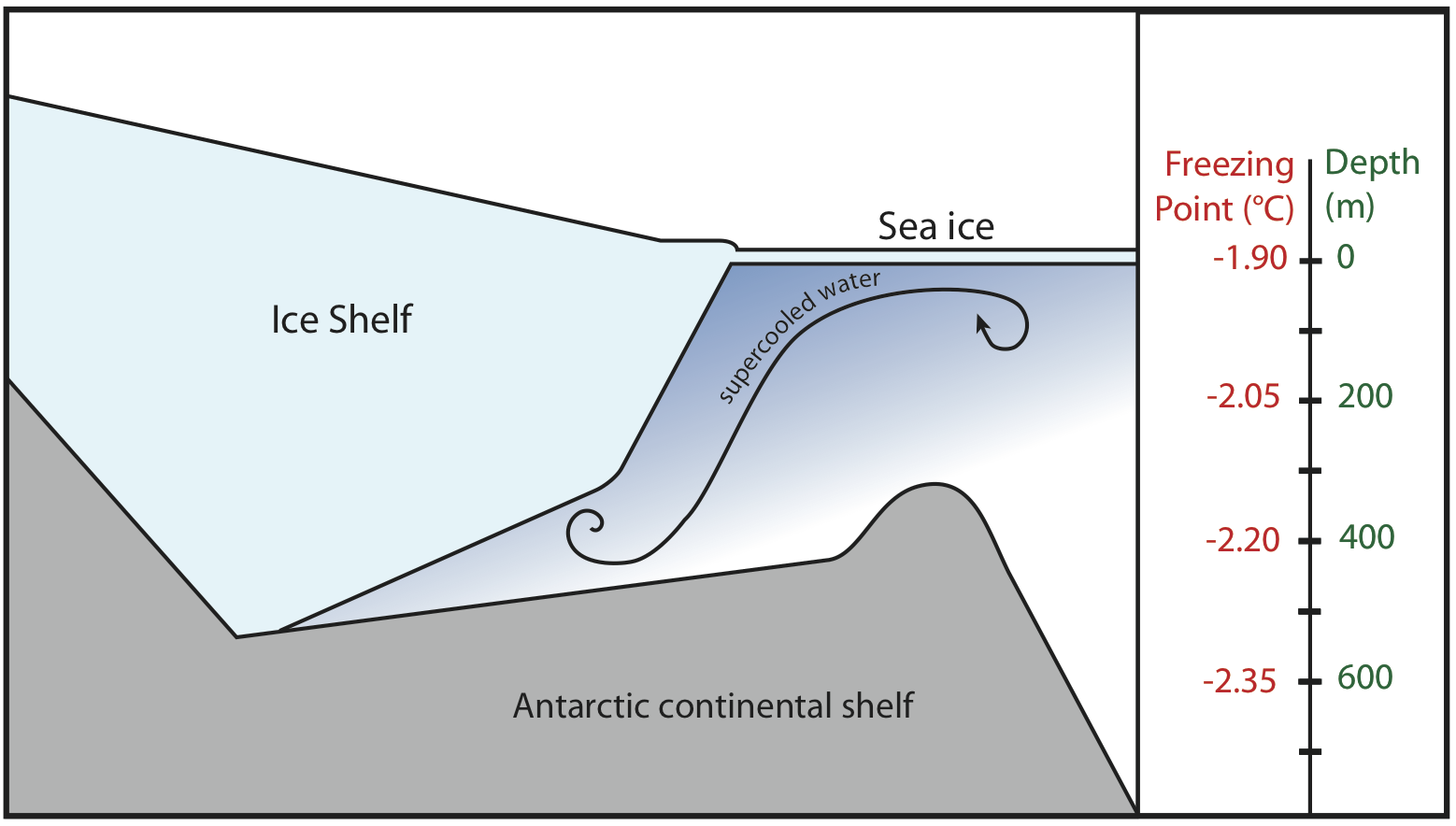
Ice shelves can cause the formation of supercooled seawater and anchor ice.

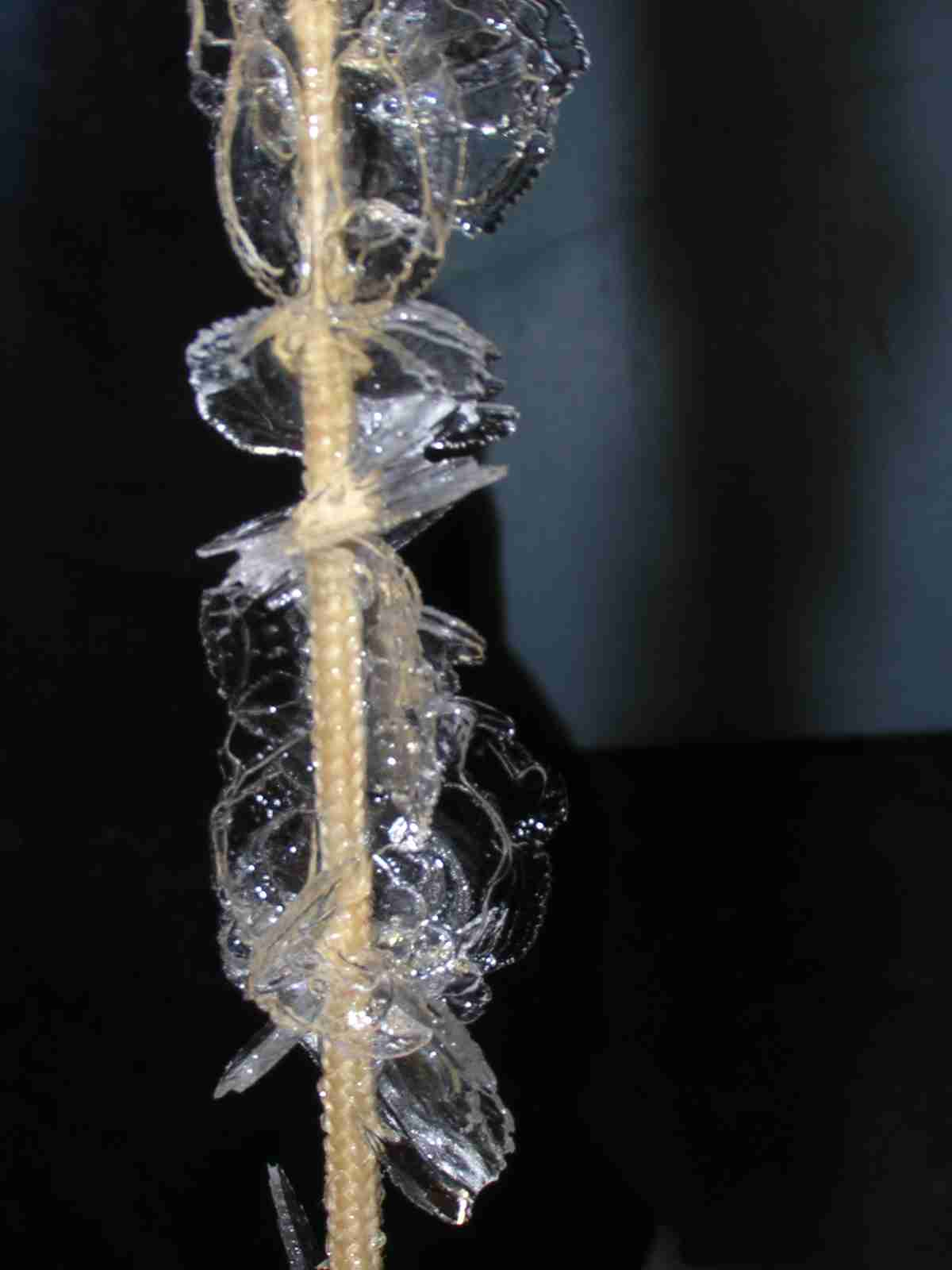
Anchor ice growing on a rope.

== Biological effects ==
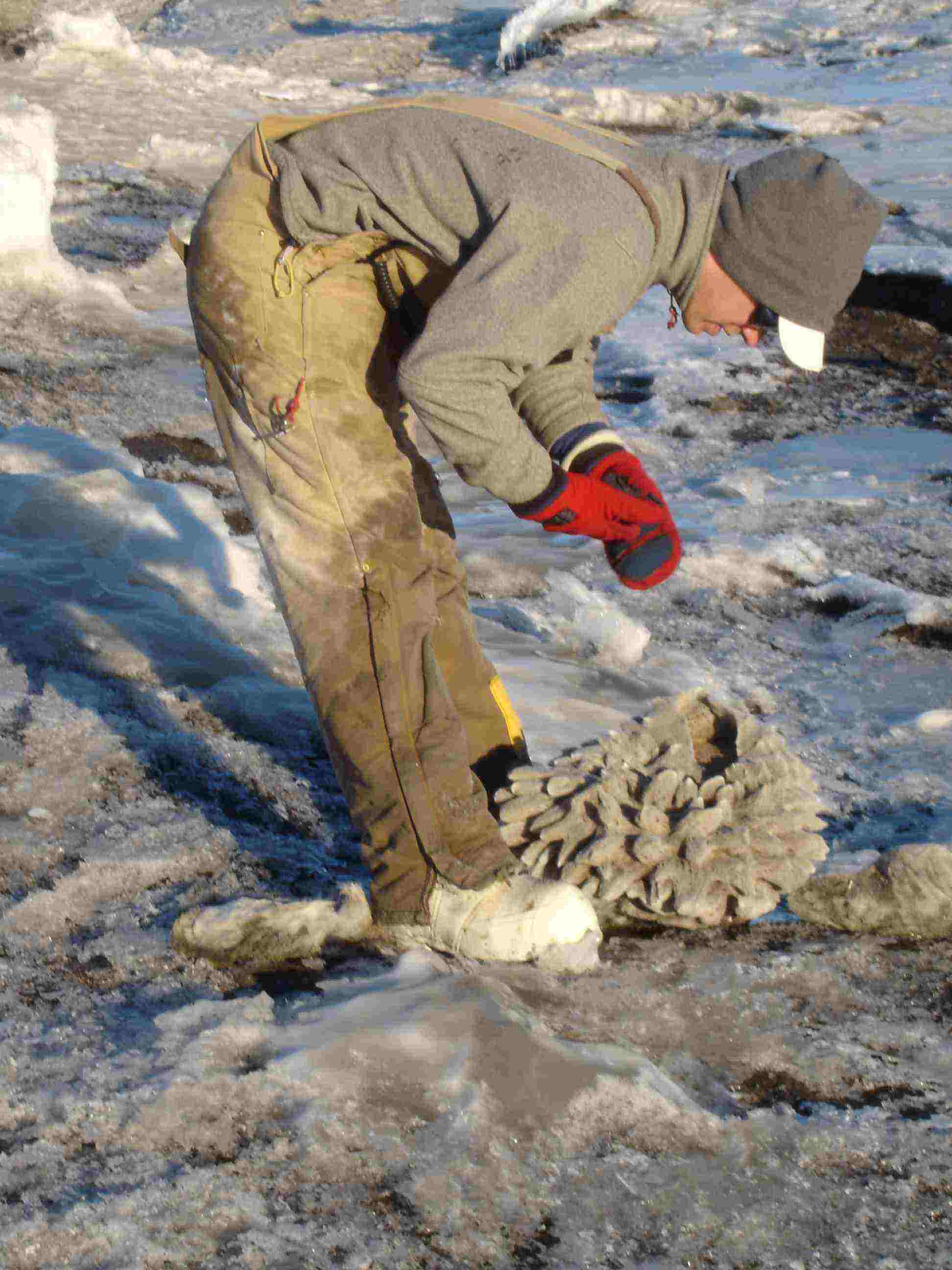
A scientist investigating a sponge on the surface of the Western McMurdo Shelf, McMurdo Sound, Antarctica

Especially in the Antarctic, anchor ice has been implicated in drastic zonation of the subtidal fauna. Many animals are directly affected by the growth of anchor ice, and certain sponges have been shown to readily grow anchor ice and to be damaged by it. Anchor ice may also grow on animate or inanimate objects and lift them from the sea floor. In the Antarctic this will most likely result in the death of an organism, since during much of the year the ocean is covered by annual sea ice, and the organism is likely to become incorporated into this.

Many organisms have actually been found on the surface of ice shelves in certain places in the Antarctic, likely due to the anchor icing phenomenon:

- Organism accumulates anchor ice as it is bathed in supercooled water.
- Organism becomes positively buoyant due to the accumulation of ice, and is lifted from the sea floor.
- Organism floats to the underside of the ice shelf or sea ice cover where it freezes in.
- Ablation of the surface of the ice cover and additional growth of ice on the underside will result in the organism being transported "through" the ice and "deposited" on the surface, largely intact.

== See also ==
- Fast ice
