= Fast ice =

Sea ice connected to the coastline

Fast ice (left, along shoreline) versus drift ice (right) in a hypothetical sea ice dynamics scenario (The bear provides an approximate scale.)

Fast ice (also called land-fast ice, landfast ice, and shore-fast ice) is sea ice or lake ice that is "fastened" to the coastline, to the sea floor along shoals, or to grounded icebergs. Fast ice may either grow in place from the sea water or by freezing pieces of drifting ice to the shore or other anchor sites. Unlike drift (or pack) ice, fast ice does not move with currents and winds.

The width (and the presence) of this ice zone is usually seasonal and depends on ice thickness, topography of the sea floor and islands. It ranges from a few meters to several hundred kilometers. Seaward expansion is a function of a number of factors, notably water depth, shoreline protection, time of year and pressure from the pack ice. In Arctic seas the fast ice extends down to depths of 20 m (65.6 ft), while in the Subarctic seas, the zone extends to depths of about 10 m (32.8 ft). In some coastal areas with abrupt shelf and no islands, e.g., in the Sea of Okhotsk off Hokkaidō, tides prevent the formation of any fast ice. Smaller ocean basins may contain only the fast ice zone with no pack ice (e.g. McMurdo Sound in Antarctica).

The topography of the fast ice varies from smooth and level to rugged (when submitted to large pressures). The ice foot refers to ice that has formed at the shoreline, through multiple freezing of water between ebb tides, and is separated from the remainder of the fast ice surface by tidal cracks. Further away from the coastline, the ice may become anchored to the sea bottom—it is then referred to as bottomfast ice. Fast ice can survive one or more melting seasons (i.e. summer), in which case it can be designated following the usual age-based categories: first-year, second-year, multiyear. The fast ice boundary is the limit between fast ice and drift (or pack) ice—in places, this boundary may coincide with a shear ridge. Fast ice may be delimited or enclose pressure ridges which extend sufficiently downward so as to be grounded—these features are known as stamukhi.

== See also ==
- Anchor ice, also called bottom-fast ice
- Ice bridge
- Sea ice
