= Zhubov scale =

Scale for reporting polar sea ice coverage

The Zhubov scale is a way of reporting polar sea ice coverage.

It was developed in the former USSR by Russian naval officer N. N. Zhubov (1895–1960) as a way for Soviet officers to describe ice coverage.

The Zhubov scale is measured by using the unit ball, one ball equals 10% coverage, five balls 50% coverage and so on, with a total of ten unit balls being possible.
