= Grease ice =

Stage in the formation of sea ice

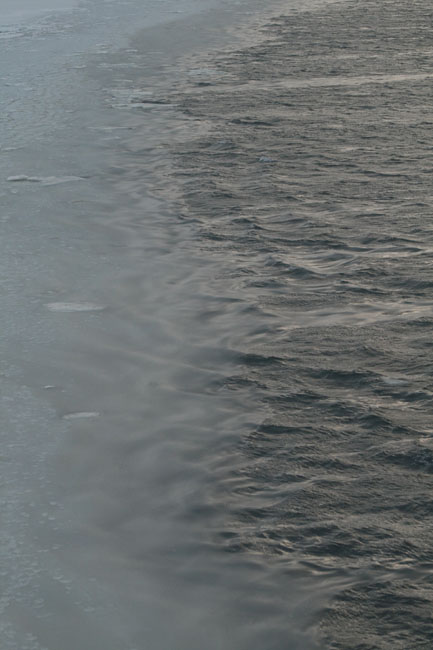
Grease ice in the Bering Sea

Grease ice is a very thin, soupy layer of frazil crystals clumped together, and only formed in large, open bodies of water most notably the ocean. Grease ice makes the water resemble an oil slick, the small crystals of ice held closely together reflect and refract light similarly to how oil will on water. Grease ice is the second stage in the formation of ice floes being the stage immediately following the frazil ice stage. Outside the ocean and seas, the Laurentian Great Lakes and Lake Baikal also form grease ice.

New sea ice formation takes place throughout the winter in the Arctic, and Antarctic where frazil forms and coalesces in polynyas or in cold-exposed regions of the open-ocean. Similarly, in seas and lakes, where latent energy is sufficient (waves, swells, fetch, tides, seiche, etc), turbulence mixes the frazil ice down into the upper layer and forms a surface layer of grease ice.

The term ‘grease ice’ follows World Meteorological Organization nomenclature. Grease ice differs from ‘slush’, where slush is similarly created by snow falling into the top layer of an ocean basin, river, or lake. The two terms are related due to the process of ice crystals being blown into a polynya, lake, ocean, or sea which can be the initiation of the grease ice layer, given a minimum level of mixing and cooling on the ocean surface.

== Formation ==
When the water surface begins to lose heat rapidly, the water becomes supercooled. Turbulence, caused by strong winds or flow from a river, will mix the supercooled water throughout its entire depth. The supercooled water will already be encouraging the formation of small ice crystals (frazil ice) and the crystals will be mixed into the upper layer and form a surface layer.

Sea ice growth in turbulent water differs from sea ice growth in calm water. In turbulent water, the ice crystals accumulate at the surface, forming a grease-ice layer composed of individual ice crystals and small irregular clumps of ice crystals. In calm water conditions, nilas, a thin, almost invisible elastic crust, forms at the surface as water molecules freeze to the ice-water interface.
