= Slush =

Mixture of snow and liquid water

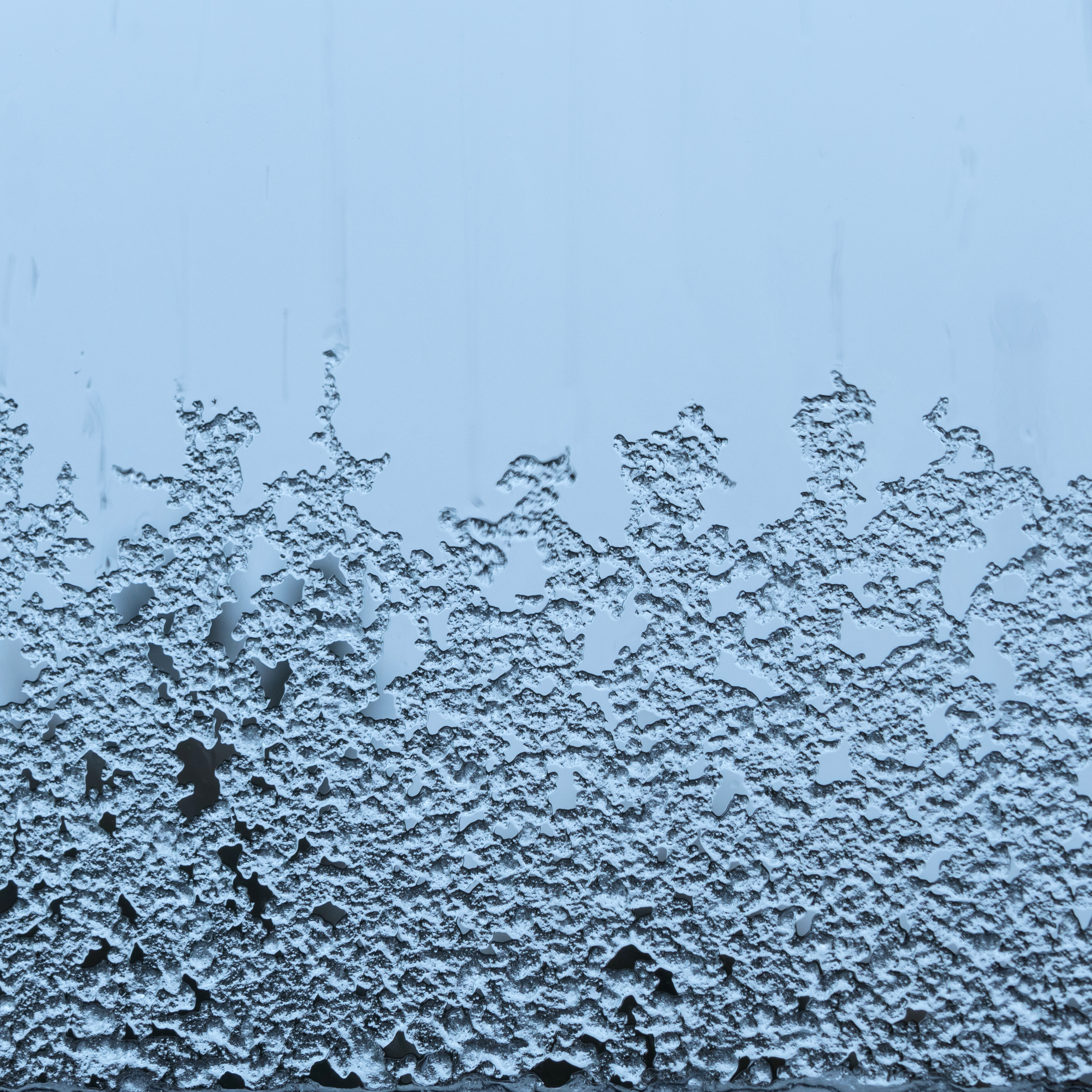
Slush on a window

Slush, also called slush ice, is a slurry mixture of small ice crystals (e.g. snow) and liquid water.

In the natural environment, slush forms when ice or snow melts or during mixed precipitation. This often mixes with dirt and other pollutants on the surface, resulting in a gray or muddy brown color. Often, solid ice or snow can block the drainage of fluid water from slushy areas, so slush often goes through multiple freeze/thaw cycles before being able to completely drain and disappear.

In areas where road salt is used to clear roadways, slush forms at lower temperatures in salted areas than it would ordinarily. This can produce a number of different consistencies over the same geographical area with scattered salted areas covered with slush and others covered with frozen precipitation.

== Hazards ==
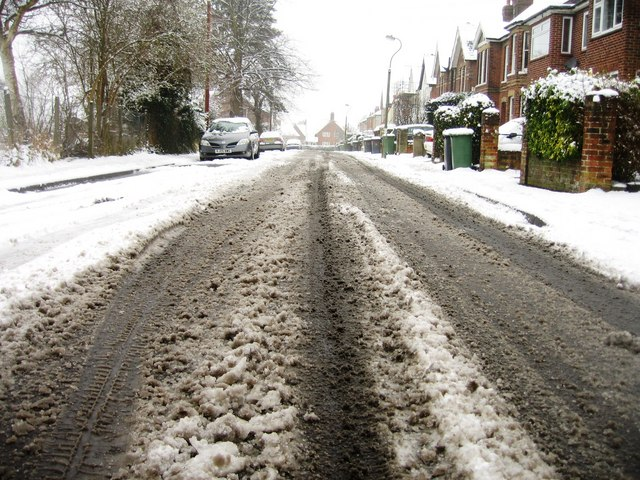
Melted snow in a roadway that has turned to slush in the wheel paths

Slush behaves like a non-Newtonian fluid, that is, as a mostly solid mass until its inner shear forces rise beyond a specific threshold and it suddenly acts as a fluid. This makes it very difficult to predict its behavior and is the underlying mechanism behind slush avalanches and their unpredictability and, thus, hidden potential to become a natural hazard without caution.

Slush can also be a problem on an aircraft runway since the effect of excess slush acting on the aircraft's wheels can have a resisting effect during takeoff, making its projection unstable, which can cause an accident such as the Munich air disaster. Slush on roads can also make roads slippery and increase the braking distances for cars and trucks, increasing the possibility of rear end crashes and other road accidents.

Slush can refreeze and become hazardous to vehicles and pedestrians.

In some cases though, slush can be beneficial. When snow hits the slush, it partially melts and also becomes slush on contact. This prevents roads from becoming too congested with snow or sleet.
