= Saturation diving =

Diving mode and decompression technique

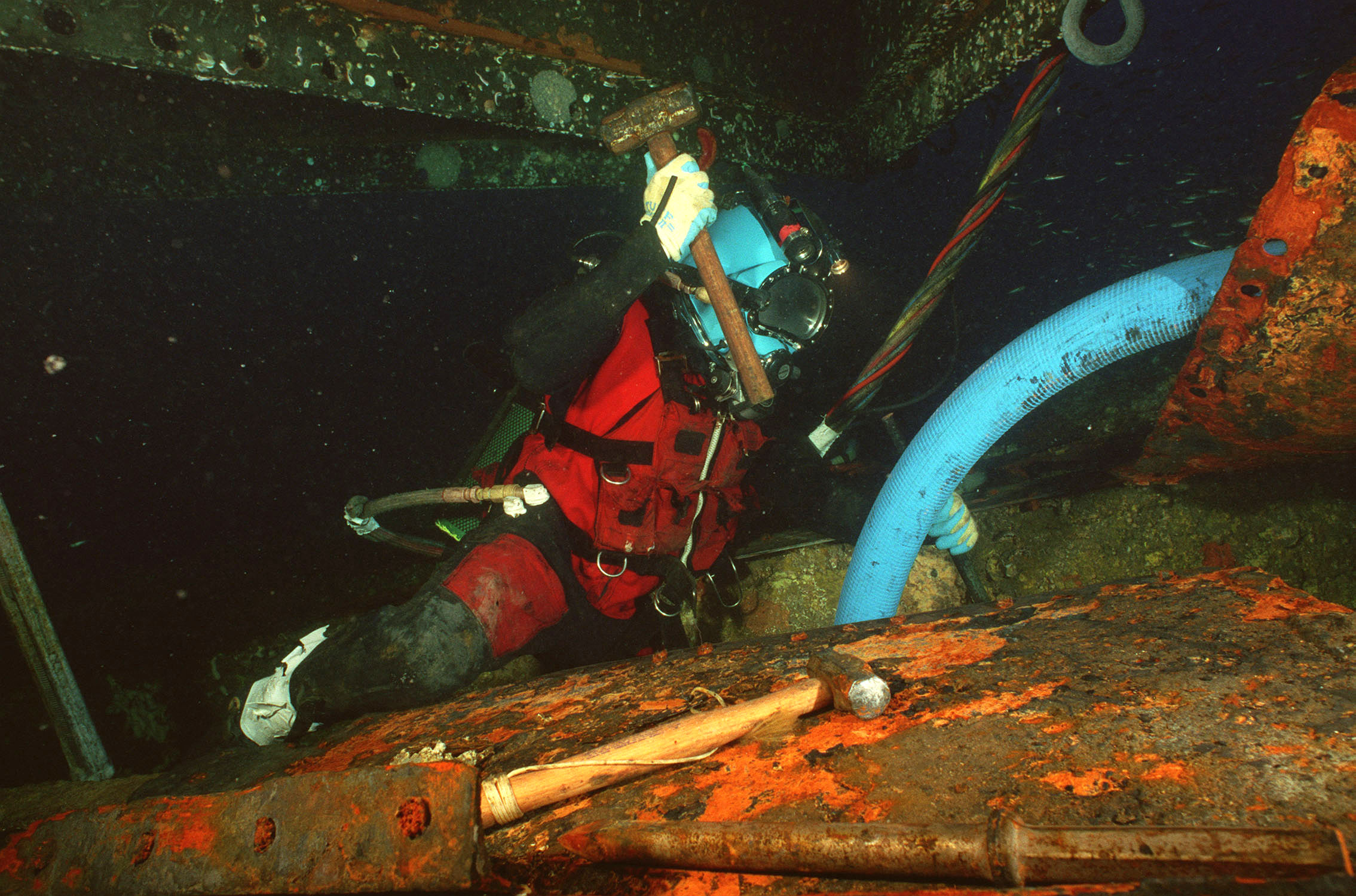
Saturation diver working on the USS Monitor wreck at 70 m (230 ft) depth

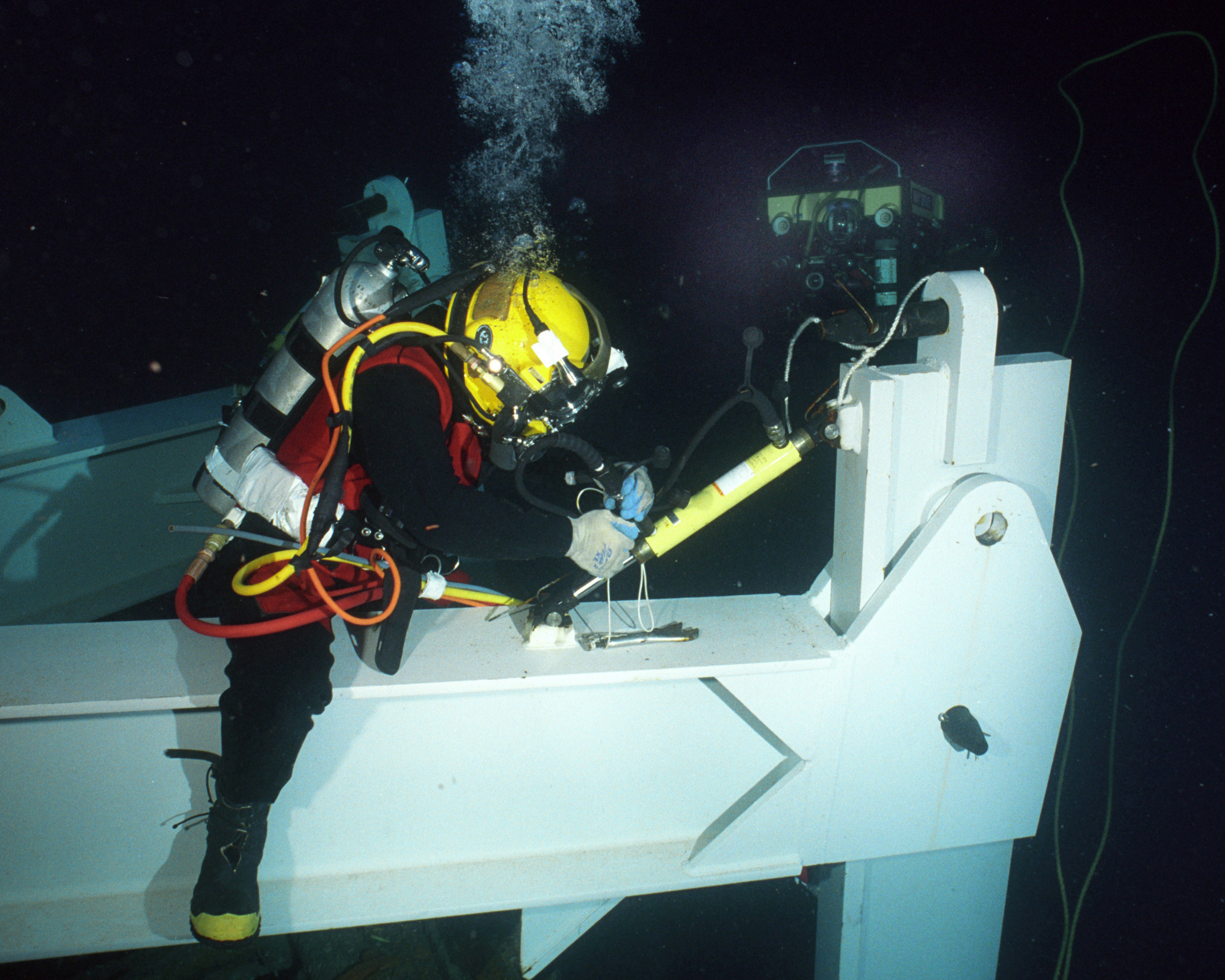
Saturation diver conducting deep-sea salvage operations

Saturation diving is an ambient pressure diving technique which allows a diver to remain at working depth for extended periods during which the body tissues become saturated with metabolically inert gas from the breathing gas mixture. Once saturated, the time required for decompression to surface pressure will not increase with longer exposure. The diver undergoes a single decompression to surface pressure at the end of the exposure of several days to weeks duration. The ratio of productive working time at depth to unproductive decompression time is thereby increased, and the health risk to the diver incurred by decompression is minimised. Unlike other ambient pressure diving, the saturation diver is only exposed to external ambient pressure while at diving depth.

The extreme exposures common in saturation diving make the physiological effects of ambient pressure diving more pronounced, and they tend to have more significant effects on the divers' safety, health, and general well-being. Several short and long term physiological effects of ambient pressure diving must be managed, including decompression stress, high pressure nervous syndrome (HPNS), compression arthralgia, dysbaric osteonecrosis, oxygen toxicity, inert gas narcosis, high work of breathing, and disruption of thermal balance.

Most saturation diving procedures are common to all surface-supplied diving, but there are some which are specific to the use of a closed bell, the restrictions of excursion limits, and the use of saturation decompression. Surface saturation systems transport the divers to the worksite in a closed bell, use surface-supplied diving equipment, and are usually installed on an offshore platform or dynamically positioned diving support vessel. Divers operating from underwater habitats may use surface-supplied equipment from the habitat or scuba equipment, and access the water through a wet porch, but will usually have to surface in a closed bell, unless the habitat includes a decompression chamber. The life support systems provide breathing gas, climate control, and sanitation for the personnel under pressure, in the accommodation and in the bell and the water. There are also communications, fire suppression and other emergency services. Bell services are provided via the bell umbilical and distributed to divers through excursion umbilicals. Life support systems for emergency evacuation are independent of the accommodation system as they must travel with the evacuation module.

Saturation diving is a specialized mode of diving; of the 3,300 commercial divers employed in the United States in 2015, 336 were saturation divers. Special training and certification is required, as the activity is inherently hazardous, and a set of standard operating procedures, emergency procedures, and a range of specialised equipment is used to control the risk, that require consistently correct performance by all the members of an extended diving team. The combination of relatively large skilled personnel requirements, complex engineering, and bulky, heavy equipment required to support a saturation diving project make it an expensive diving mode, but it allows direct human intervention at places that would not otherwise be practical, and where it is applied, it is generally more economically viable than other options, if such exist.

Saturation Diver below diving bell, North Sea. c.2017

== History ==
On December 22, 1938, Edgar End and Max Nohl made the first intentional saturation dive by spending 27 hours breathing air at 101 feet sea water (fsw) (30.8 metres sea water (msw)) in the County Emergency Hospital recompression facility in Milwaukee, Wisconsin. Their decompression lasted five hours leaving Nohl with a mild case of decompression sickness that resolved with recompression.

Albert R. Behnke proposed the idea of exposing humans to increased ambient pressures long enough for the blood and tissues to become saturated with inert gases in 1942. In 1957, George F. Bond began the Genesis project at the Naval Submarine Medical Research Laboratory proving that humans could in fact withstand prolonged exposure to different breathing gases and increased environmental pressures. Once saturation is achieved, the amount of time needed for decompression depends on the depth and gases breathed, and does not increase with further exposure. This was the beginning of saturation diving and the US Navy's Man-in-the-Sea Program. The first commercial saturation dives were performed in 1965 by Westinghouse to replace faulty trash racks at 200 feet (61 m) on the Smith Mountain Dam. In the same year, the Conshelf III experiment was carried out by Jacques Cousteau and a group of divers for three weeks at the depth of 100 m.

Peter B. Bennett is credited with the invention of trimix breathing gas as a method to eliminate high pressure nervous syndrome. In 1981, at the Duke University Medical Center, Bennett conducted an experiment called Atlantis III, which involved subjecting volunteers to a pressure of 2250 fsw (686 msw), and slowly decompressing them to atmospheric pressure over a period of over 31 days, setting an early world record for depth-equivalent pressure in the process. A later experiment, Atlantis IV, encountered problems as one of the volunteers experienced euphoric hallucinations and hypomania.

Early experiments in saturation diving were often done in underwater habitats, usually serviced by surface vessels, but in relatively exposed waters the advantage of being able to abandon the site in bad conditions encouraged the use of saturation facilities on board the support vessel, where logistics are simplified.

The history of commercial saturation diving is closely linked to offshore oil and gas extraction. In the early 1960s exploration of the North Sea started on the premise that the Dutch gas fields might extend under the sea. This was borne out when the Gulf Tide drill rig hit the Ekofisk reservoir in 1969, and in 1971 Shell oil found the Brent oilfield between Norway and Shetland. From this time to the 1990s the industry developed the procedures and equipment for saturation diving from pioneering and experimental, with a somewhat dubious safety record, to a mature industry with greatly improved occupational health and safety.

The first US Navy saturation procedures were published in the US Navy Diving Manual revision 2 of 1979. They allowed an upward excursion to start decompression, used a constant decompression rate deeper than 60 msw and varied rates from 60 msw to surface. Decompression was interrupted for a night stop and an afternoon stop, and partial pressure of oxygen was constant deeper than the fire risk zone, after which oxygen fraction was limited.

When the North Sea drilling started, there was little diving support infrastructure in Europe, and the high wages attracted divers from the Gulf of Mexico oilfields, who introduced the fibre reinforced resin lightweight demand helmets from Kirby Morgan, hot water suits from Diving Unlimited International, and the U.S. Navy Diving Manual, at the time the leading set of offshore diving procedures. Research and development money was available, and new technical developments were supported by the European Economic Community. A major challenge was developing saturation diving practices suitable to the common North Sea depth range of 100 to 180 m.

During the early drilling stages most of the diving work was for relatively short periods and was generally suitable for bell bounce diving, but the development of oilfield seabed infrastructure required much longer diver interventions, and saturation diving procedures were developed to suit. By 1982, a large amount of shallow maintenance work was becoming necessary, which brought in more air diving to service the rigs. By 2017 about 80% of North Sea diving was heliox saturation diving and the other 20% shallow air diving.

Excursion dives without decompression stops can be done both upward and downward from saturation storage pressure within limits, allowing the divers a range of working depths, and if work is required beyond excursion range, the divers can be compressed or decompressed in storage to suit the changed depth range. Further work was done by the United States Navy Experimental Diving Unit on excursion dives from February 1974 to June 1976, and the results published in the 1984 U.S. Navy Diving Manual. These tables used a partial pressure of oxygen of 0.35 to 0.4 bar during decompression, with quite slow decompression rates, which varied with the depth, getting slower as the depth decreased, with a 6-hour stop from midnight and a two-hour stop from 14:00 and a gas fraction limit for oxygen of 22% for the last part of the ascent to reduce fire risk. The tables allowed decompression to start directly after return from a dive provided there had not been an upward excursion, as this was found to increase the risk of bubble development.

At the same time, the commercial diving contractor Compagnie maritime d'expertises (COMEX) had been developing slightly different decompression procedures, in which the oxygen partial pressures were higher, between 0.6 and 0.8 bar, and the ascent rates were faster to take advantage of the high P_{O_{2}}. Continuous decompression without night stops was used, and excursions were allowed. Over time these were revised to use lower P_{O_{2}} and slower ascent rates, particularly at the shallower depths. Competing tables were thought to be used to gain competitive advantage, so in 1988 the Norwegian Petroleum Directorate organised a conference on saturation decompression safety under Val Hempleman, and in 1990 a conference to harmonise the saturation tables to be used in the Norwegial sector of the North Sea used input from five contractors. In 1999 the NORSOK U100 standard was published, which was a compromise using aspects of several of the tables, and has proven in use to be sufficiently conservative with a good safety record.

In the 1980s the Royal Navy were using an oxygen partial pressure of 0.42 bar for decompression from saturation, which is slightly higher than the 0.40 bar of the US Navy table. This reduced the time for decompression by a small percentage.

The 1981 salvage of the gold on HMS Edinburgh at 256 metres (840 ft) was the first commercial use of helium reclaim systems, and set a new depth record for sustained commercial saturation diving.

Saturation decompression in the Brazil oilfields took a slightly different route, and was originally based on company tables, until Brazil produced their own legislation in 1988, similar to that of the UK's Health and Safety Executive. In 2004 revised legislation was closer to the COMEX procedures.

There have been no major research projects since the Norwegian deep diving contracts, and since then commercial procedures have evolved through cumulative empirical adjustments based on the experience of freelance personnel moving between companies, changes due to mergers and takeovers between contractors, and guidance by regulations, industry standards and client requirements. By 2017 the system had settled into a chamber P_{O_{2}} of 0.5 bar while deeper than 15 msw, and limited to 22 to 23% at the end of decompression to limit fire risk.

=== Extreme depth effects ===
A breathing gas mixture of oxygen, helium and hydrogen (hydreliox) was developed for use at extreme diving pressures to reduce the effects of high pressure nervous syndrome. Between 1978 and 1984, a group of divers at Duke University in North Carolina conducted the Atlantis series of onshore hyperbaric chamber deep experimental dives. In 1981, during an extreme depth test dive to 686 metres (2251 ft) they breathed a conventional heliox mixture with difficulty and experienced tremors and memory lapses.

A (hydreliox) gas mixture was used during a similar experimental chamber dive by three divers for the French Comex S.A. offshore diving contractor in 1992. On 18 November 1992, Comex stopped the dive at a pressure of 675 meters of sea water (msw) (2215 fsw) because the divers were suffering from insomnia and fatigue. All three divers were willing to continue, but the research leader decided to decompress the chamber to 650 msw (2133 fsw). On 20 November, Comex diver Theo Mavrostomos was allowed to continue but spent only two hours at 701 msw (2300 fsw), although the intention had been to spend four and a half days at this depth and perform planned tasks.

== Applications ==
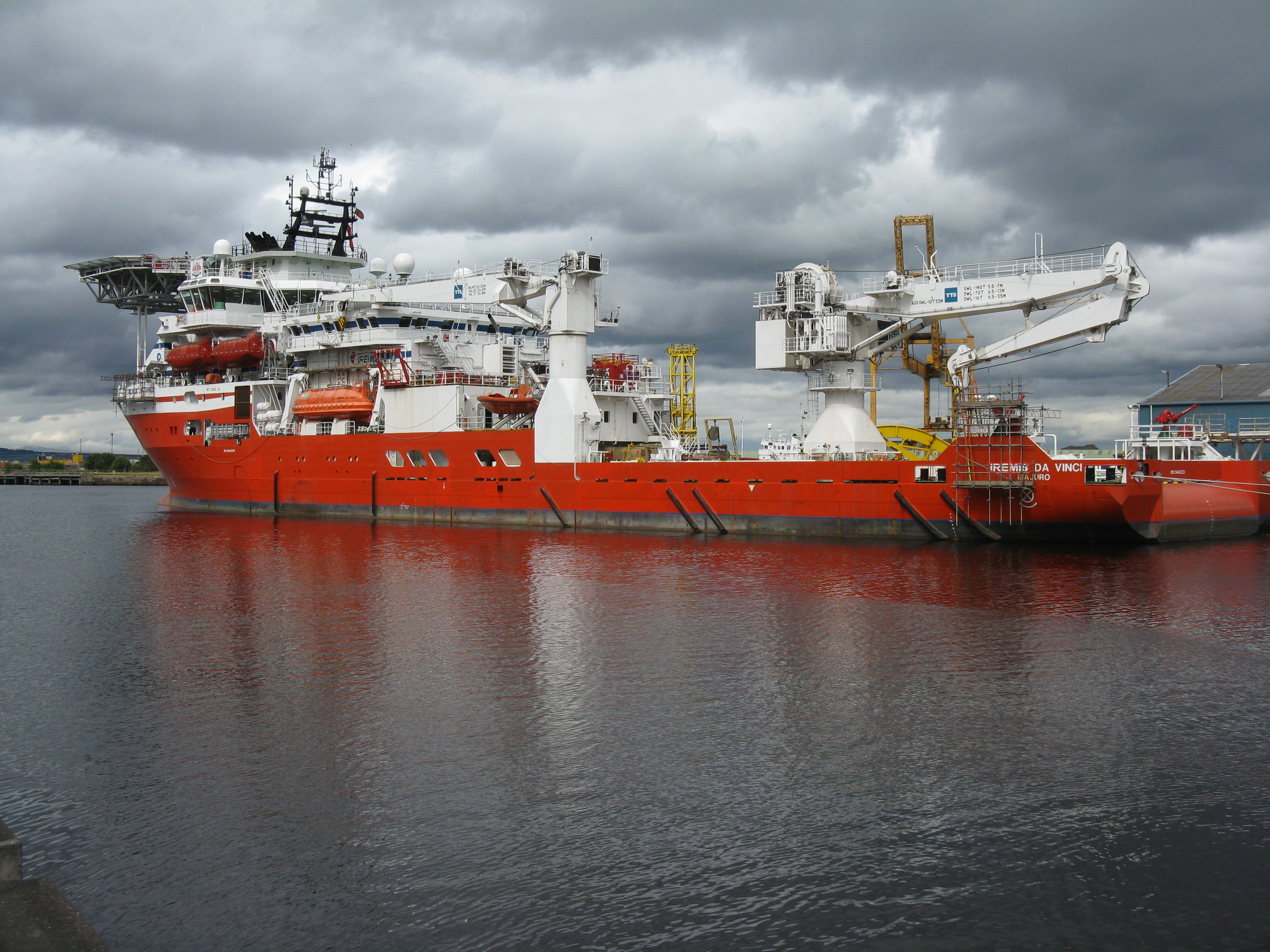
Iremis da Vinci at the Albert Dock Basin, Port of Leith. A multi-purpose diving support vessel, built in the Republic of Korea in 2011, and registered at Majuro, Marshall Islands, it is 115.4m long and has a gross tonnage of 8691t.

Saturation diving has applications mainly in commercial offshore diving, scientific diving and marine salvage, and occasionally for military objectives.

Commercial offshore diving, sometimes shortened to just offshore diving, is a branch of commercial diving, with divers working in support of the exploration and production sector of the oil and gas industry in places such as the Gulf of Mexico in the United States, the North Sea in the United Kingdom and Norway, and along the coast of Brazil. The work in this area of the industry includes maintenance of oil platforms and the building of underwater structures. In this context "offshore" implies that the diving work is done outside of national boundaries and territorial waters, often in the exclusive economic zone of the continental shelf. Saturation diving work in support of the offshore oil and gas industries is usually contract based.

Saturation diving is standard practice for bottom work at many of the deeper offshore sites, and allows more effective use of the diver's time while reducing the risk of decompression sickness. Surface oriented air diving is more usual in shallower water. Saturation diving for other industrial and military applications, such a marine salvage or underwater construction, are also likely to use a surface saturation system as a base for operations, but scientific saturation diving is more likely to operate from an underwater habitat.

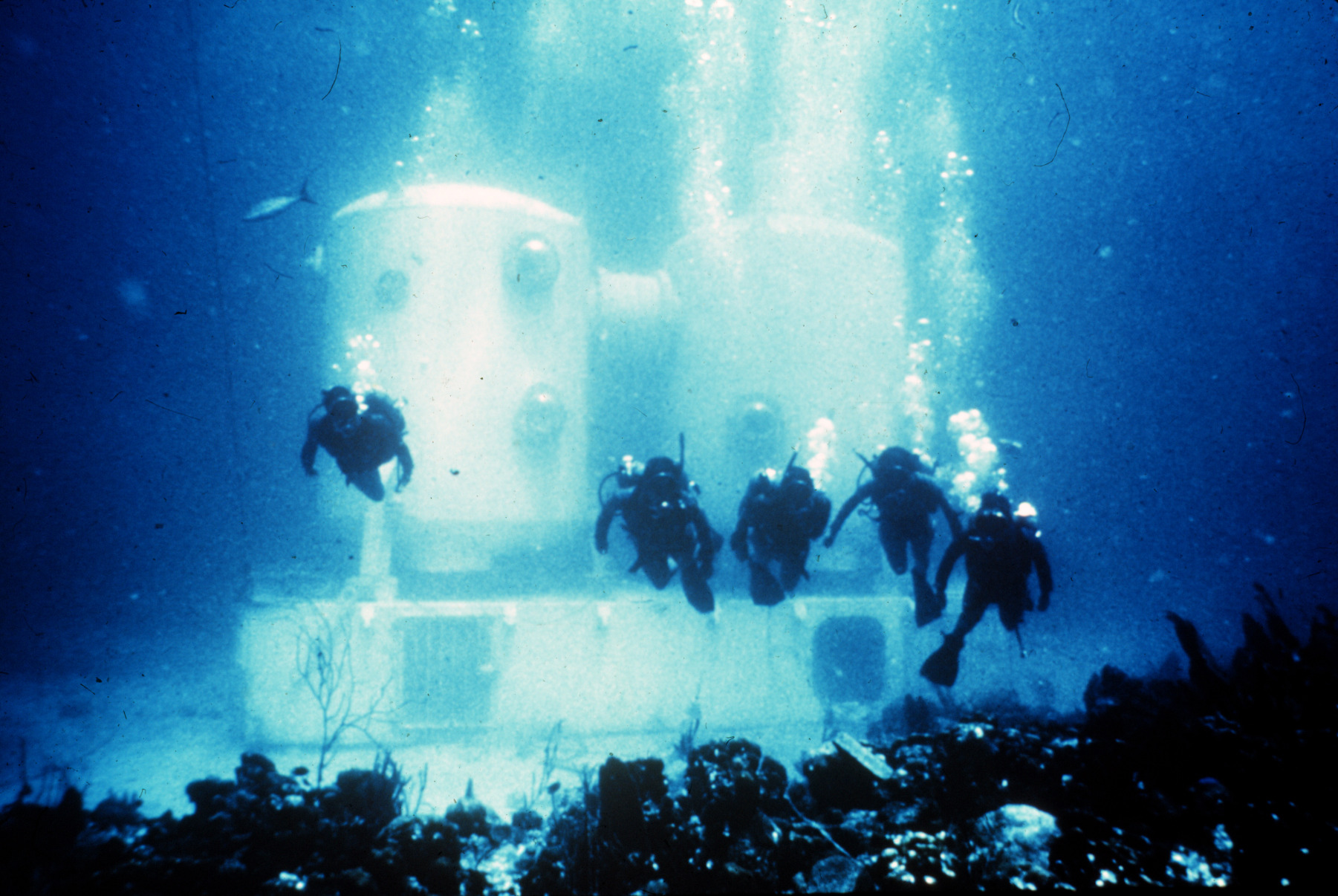
Tektite I habitat

Underwater habitats are underwater structures in which people can live for extended periods and carry out most of the basic human functions of a 24-hour day, such as working, resting, eating, attending to personal hygiene, and sleeping. In this context 'habitat' is generally used in a narrow sense to mean the interior and immediate exterior of the structure and its fixtures, but not its surrounding marine environment. Most early underwater habitats lacked regenerative systems for air, water, food, electricity, and other resources. However, recently some new underwater habitats allow for these resources to be delivered using pipes, or generated within the habitat, rather than manually delivered.

Scientific saturation diving is relatively more likely to be done from an underwater habitat, where the scientists expect to spend a lot of time in the vicinity of the habitat, and to do laboratory work in the habitat along with field work outside.

== Physiological and medical aspects ==
The extreme exposures common in saturation diving make the physiological effects common to other modes of ambient pressure diving more pronounced, and they tend to have more significant effects on the divers' safety, health, and general well-being. Several physiological effects of ambient pressure diving must be managed.

=== Decompression sickness ===
Decompression sickness (DCS) is a potentially fatal condition caused by bubbles of inert gas, which can occur in divers' bodies as a consequence of the pressure reduction as they ascend. To prevent decompression sickness, divers have to limit their rate of ascent, to reduce the concentration of dissolved gases in their body sufficiently to avoid bubble formation and growth. This protocol, known as decompression, can last for several hours for dives in excess of 50 metres (160 ft) when divers spend more than a few minutes at these depths. The longer divers remain at depth, the more inert gas is absorbed into their body tissues, and the time required for decompression increases rapidly. This presents a problem for operations that require divers to work for extended periods at depth, as the time spent decompressing can exceed the time spent doing useful work by a large margin. However, after somewhere around 72 hours under any given pressure, depending on the ingassing model used, divers' bodies become saturated with inert gas, and no further uptake occurs. From that point onward, no increase in decompression time is necessary. The practice of saturation diving takes advantage of this by providing a means for divers to remain at depth pressure for days or weeks. At the end of that period, divers need to carry out a single saturation decompression, which is much more efficient and a lower risk than making multiple short dives, each of which requires a lengthy decompression time. By making the single decompression slower and longer, in the controlled conditions and relative comfort of the saturation habitat or decompression chamber, the risk of decompression sickness during the single exposure is further reduced.

=== Inert gas narcosis ===
Inert gas narcosis is a reversible alteration in consciousness that occurs while diving at depth. It is caused by the anesthetic effect of certain gases at high partial pressure. It can occur during shallow dives, but does not usually become noticeable at depths less than 30 metres (98 ft). Except for helium and probably neon, all gases that can be breathed have a narcotic effect, although widely varying in degree. As depth increases, the mental impairment may become hazardous. Divers can learn to cope with some of the effects of narcosis, but it is impossible to develop a tolerance. Narcosis can affect all ambient pressure divers, although susceptibility varies widely among individuals and from dive to dive.

Narcosis may be completely reversed in a few minutes by ascending to a shallower depth, with no long-term effects. To dive at greater depths, as narcosis and oxygen toxicity become critical risk factors, gas mixtures such as trimix or heliox are used. These mixtures prevent or reduce narcosis by replacing some or all of the inert fraction of the breathing gas with non-narcotic helium. There is a relationship between carbon dioxide toxicity and inert gas narcosis which is recognised but not fully understood. Conditions where high work of breathing due to gas density occur tend to exacerbate this effect.

=== Work of breathing ===
Work of breathing (WOB) is the energy expended to inhale and exhale a breathing gas. In a normal resting state the work of breathing constitutes about 5% of the total body oxygen consumption. It can increase considerably due to constraints on gas flow imposed by breathing apparatus, ambient pressure, or breathing gas composition. Work of breathing is affected by several factors in underwater diving at ambient pressure. There are physiological effects of immersion, physical effects of ambient pressure and breathing gas mixture, and mechanical effects of the gas supply system.

Density of a given gas mixture is proportional to absolute pressure at a constant temperature throughout the range of respirable pressures, and resistance to flow is a function of flow velocity, density and viscosity. When the density exceeds about 6g/litre the exercise tolerance of the diver becomes significantly reduced, and by 10 g/litre it is marginal. At this stage even moderate exertion may cause a carbon dioxide buildup that cannot be reversed by increased ventilation, as the work required to increase ventilation produces more carbon dioxide than is eliminated by the increased ventilation, and flow may be choked by the effects of dynamic airway compression. This effect can be delayed by using lower density gas such as helium in the breathing mix to keep the combined density below 6 g/litre.

Carbon dioxide retention as a consequence of excessively high work of breathing may cause direct symptoms of carbon dioxide toxicity, and synergistic effects with nitrogen narcosis and CNS oxygen toxicity which is aggravated by cerebral vasodilation due to high carbon dioxide levels causing increased dosage of oxygen to the brain.

=== High-pressure nervous syndrome ===
High-pressure nervous syndrome (HPNS) is a neurological and physiological diving disorder that results when a diver descends below about 500 feet (150 m) while breathing a helium–oxygen mixture. The effects depend on the rate of descent and the depth, with slow descent reducing the effects. HPNS is a limiting factor in future deep diving, but can be reduced by using a small percentage of nitrogen in the gas mixture. Hydrogen in the breathing gas also appears to reduce the effects of HPNS, but the effect has not been extensively studied due to the fire and explosion hazard involved in managing mixtures which contain hydrogen and oxygen. There is some circumstantial evidence that HPNS symptoms increase when chamber temperature is too high.

=== Compression arthralgia ===
Compression arthralgia is a deep aching pain in the joints caused by exposure to high ambient pressure at a relatively high rate of compression, experienced by underwater divers. The pain may occur in the knees, shoulders, fingers, back, hips, neck or ribs, and may be sudden and intense in onset and may be accompanied by a feeling of roughness in the joints. Onset commonly occurs around 60 msw (meters of sea water), and symptoms are variable depending on depth, compression rate and personal susceptibility. Intensity increases with depth and may be aggravated by exercise. Compression arthralgia is generally a problem of deep diving, particularly deep saturation diving, where at sufficient depth even slow compression may produce symptoms. The use of trimix can reduce the symptoms. Spontaneous improvement may occur over time at depth, but this is unpredictable, and pain may persist into decompression. Compression arthralgia may be easily distinguished from decompression sickness as it starts during descent, is present before starting decompression, and resolves with decreasing pressure, the opposite of decompression sickness. The pain may be sufficiently severe to limit the diver's capacity for work, and may also limit the depth of downward excursions.

=== Dysbaric osteonecrosis ===
Saturation diving (or more precisely, long term exposure to high pressure) is associated with aseptic bone necrosis, a form of ischaemic bone disease caused by nitrogen bubbles formed during decompression, although it is not yet known if all divers are affected or only especially sensitive ones. The joints are most vulnerable to osteonecrosis. The connection between high-pressure exposure, decompression procedure and osteonecrosis is not fully understood.

=== Oxygen toxicity ===
Both acute and chronic oxygen toxicity are significant risks in saturation diving. The storage breathing gas exposes the divers to one continuous level of oxygen concentration for extended periods, on the order of a month at a time, which requires the gas in the habitat to be maintained at a long term tolerable partial pressure, generally around 0.4 bar, which is well tolerated, and allows for quite large accidental deviations without causing hypoxia. This may be increased during decompression, but as decompression may take over a week, the safely tolerable increase is limited, and at lower pressures oxygen partial pressure is also limited by fire hazard considerations.

Bell and excursion gas composition must suit the planned dive profile. A higher oxygen partial pressure may be tolerable over the working period, but it may be logistically preferable to use the same gas used for storage. Bailout gas may have a higher oxygen content. At one time the recommended bailout oxygen partial pressure was significantly higher than used in the main gas supply.

The choice of decompression gas is also a balance between efficacy for flushing inert gas and avoiding pulmonary oxygen toxicity, and it can be balanced between the risks based on the time required for the decompression, which in turn is affected by the oxygen partial pressure A P_{O_{2}} of 0.6 bar was used by some tables, when the exposure was not excessive, but with deeper exposures the decompression takes longer and the P_{O_{2}} must be reduced. A survey of offshore saturation diving contractors showed that the trend in 2024 was a mode of 0.5 bar with a maximum of 0.53 bar and minimum of 0.49 bar for decompression.

=== Thermal balance of the diver ===
Heat transfer to and via gases at higher pressure than atmospheric is increased as higher-density gases have a higher heat capacity. This effect is also modified by changes in breathing gas composition necessary for reducing narcosis and work of breathing, to limit oxygen toxicity and to accelerate decompression. Since helium conducts heat readily, divers in a helium based atmosphere will lose or gain heat fast if the gas temperature is too low or too high. These effects decrease the tolerable temperature range in a saturation habitat.

The heat loss situation is very different in the saturation living areas, which are temperature and humidity controlled, in the dry bell, and in the water. The temperature in the living quarters must be kept high enough to prevent hypothermia, typically in the range from 85 to 93 °F (29 to 34 °C), depending on the storage pressure.

The alveoli of the lungs are very effective at heat and humidity transfer. Inspired gas that reaches them is heated to core body temperature and humidified to saturation in the time needed for gas exchange, regardless of the initial temperature and humidity. This heat and humidity are lost to the environment in open circuit breathing systems. When heat loss exceeds heat generation, body temperature will fall. Exertion increases heat production by metabolic processes, but when breathing gas is cold and dense, heat loss due to the increased volume of gas breathed to support these metabolic processes can result in a net loss of heat, even if the heat loss through the skin is minimised.

Heat loss to breathing gas is less for the diver on surface supply compared to open circuit bailout, as the breathing gas from the umbilical will not be significantly colder than water temperature, while gas supplied from the first stage bailout regulator can be several degrees below freezing, but heat loss is greater when deeper due to the higher density of the breathing gas inducing a greater thermal capacity for a given breath volume. Heating the gas before breathing reduces this heat loss from the body core. The use of helium diluent reduces heat loss by this mechanism as it has a lower heat capacity due to lower density. The high thermal conductivity of helium is irrelevant in this situation.

=== Health effects of living under saturation conditions ===
There is some evidence of long term cumulative reduction in lung function in saturation divers, and long term cumulative exposure to high oxygen partial pressures is associated with accelerated development of cataracts. Dysbaric osteonecrosis is considered a consequence of decompression injury rather than living under saturation conditions.

Saturation divers are frequently troubled by superficial infections such as skin rashes, otitis externa and athlete's foot, which occur during and after saturation exposures. This is thought to be a consequence of raised partial pressure of oxygen, and relatively high temperatures and humidity in the accommodation.

Saturation diving is known to be associated with endothelial dysfunction and inflammatory stress, but this is followed by recovery, making a rest period between saturation exposures important. The current practice appears to be sufficient, as a diver has passed the saturation medical examination at the age of 61, but further data is needed to allow more confident assessment, and to identify if there are any interactions between effects of saturation and bounce diving and use of alternative breathing gases.

Imbert et al. (2019) surveyed saturation divers regarding post decompression effects. A large minority reported headaches and fatigue for up to ten days during and after most decompressions, but recovered to pre-decompression state. This effect is ascribed to acclimatisation to change in oxygen partial pressure during saturation and decompression, with minor changes in hematocrit and hemoglobin concentrations, and appears to be reversible without treatment. Allowing time for recovery is one of the reasons for limiting the duration of exposures and length of the surface interval.

The saturation environment has been reported to alter redox homeostasis, immunological function, fluid balance, and haematological variables. Muscle mass loss has often been reported, and may be associated with reductions in protein synthesis, increased basal metabolism and changes to metabolic fuel utilisation. The small living spaces may reduce the diver's ability to maintain familiar levels of physical activity.

=== Nutrition ===
The saturation environment is thought to be disruptive to physiological and metabolic homeostasis, and saturation diving requires a high energy intake, estimated at between 44 and 52 kcal/kg body mass per day, varying depending on the underwater activity. Nutrition should support red blood cell production and reduction of free radicals, and support endogenous antioxidant reserves. Sufficient hydration should be maintained, and carbohydrates should be adequate for the underwater work.

== Operating procedures ==
Saturation diving allows professional divers to live and work at pressures greater than 50 msw (160 fsw) for days or weeks at a time, though lower pressures have been used for scientific work from underwater habitats. This type of diving allows for greater economy of work and enhanced safety for the divers. After working in the water, they rest and live in a dry pressurized habitat on, or connected to, a diving support vessel, oil platform or other floating work station, at approximately the same pressure as the work depth. The diving team is compressed from surface pressure only once, at the beginning of the work period, and decompressed to surface pressure once, after the entire work period of days or weeks. Between the initial compression and final decompression, the storage depth may be altered a small number of times. There are accepted safe upward and downward excursion limits based on the storage depth. Excursions to greater depths require decompression when returning to storage depth, and excursions to shallower depths are also limited by decompression obligations to avoid decompression sickness during the excursion. Most of the diving skills required for saturation diving are the same as for surface-oriented surface-supplied diving. Other personnel work in support of the divers, to supervise and operate the support equipment.

Increased use of underwater remotely operated vehicles (ROVs) and autonomous underwater vehicles (AUVs) for routine or planned tasks means that saturation dives are becoming less common, though complicated underwater tasks requiring complex manual actions remain the preserve of the deep-sea saturation diver.

=== Personnel requirements ===
A saturation diving team requires at the minimum the following personnel:

- A diving supervisor (on duty during any diving operations)
- Two life-support supervisors (working shifts while there are divers under pressure)
- Two life-support technicians (also working shifts)
- Two divers in the bell (working diver and bellman – they may alternate during the dive)
- One surface stand-by diver (on duty when the bell is in the water)
- One tender for the surface stand-by diver

In some jurisdictions there will also be a diving medical practitioner on standby, but not necessarily on site, and some companies may require a diving medical technician on site. The actual personnel actively engaged in aspects of the operation are usually more than the minimum, as the minimum is required for a single shift per day, and where multiple shifts are used for better utilisation of assets, more dive team staff are needed. A two diver bell can support six divers working three 8-hour shifts, and a three diver bell can support 9 divers. Saturation systems are advertised with accommodations for 6 to 24 occupants. The largest systems will usually operate two bells, and may be configured for multiple storage depths.

=== Compression ===
Compression to storage depth, also referred to as blowdown, is generally at a limited rate to minimize the risk of HPNS and compression arthralgia. Norwegian standards specifies a maximum compression rate of 1 msw per minute, and a rest period at storage depth after compression and before diving. There is considerable variation in the recommended compression rates among the statutory and commercial proprietary procedures compared in a 2024 study, but no significant evidence that any of them are problematic. Initial system atmosphere is generally air at atmospheric pressure, so approximately 0.21 bar oxygen and 0.79 bar nitrogen.

=== Storage depth ===
Storage depth, also known as living depth, is the pressure in the accommodation sections of the saturation habitat—the ambient pressure under which the saturation divers live when not engaged in lock-out activity. Any change in storage depth involves a compression or a decompression, both of which are stressful to the occupants, and therefore dive planning should minimize the need for changes of living depth and excursion exposures, and storage depth should be as close as practicable to the working depth, taking into account all relevant safety considerations.

After compression to storage depth there is generally a hold time at constant pressure before divers are deployed on a working dive.

==== Split level storage depth ====
If the range of depths requiring saturation diver intervention is too large for excursions based on a single storage depth, the accommodation can be divided into sections at differing storage depths, allowing a wider range of intervention depths. This is referred to as spit level storage. Each section of the accommodation that has a different storage depth must have its own access to the transfer chamber that is independent of the sections pressurised to other depths. The bell and transfer chamber are pressurised to suit the divers using them at the time.

=== Atmosphere control ===
The hyperbaric atmosphere in the accommodation chambers and the bell are controlled to ensure that the risk of long term adverse effects on the divers is acceptably low. Most saturation diving is done on heliox mixtures, with partial pressure of oxygen in accommodation areas kept around 0.40 to 0.48 bar (most commonly 0.40 to 0.42 bar), which is near the upper limit for long term exposure. Carbon dioxide is removed from the chamber gas by recycling it through scrubber cartridges. The levels are generally limited to a maximum of 0.005 bar partial pressure, equivalent to 0.5% surface equivalent. Most of the balance is helium, with a small amount of nitrogen and trace residuals from the air in the system before compression. These traces tend to reduce during the saturation period as gas is lost and replaced with heliox. Odours and other impurites may be removed by activated carbon filters. Humidity and temperature are also controlled for health and comfort.

Bell operations and lockouts may also be done at between 0.4 and 0.6 bar oxygen partial pressure, but often use a higher partial pressure of oxygen, between 0.6 and 0.9 bar,(0.6 to 0.8 bar) which lessens the effect of pressure variation due to excursions away from holding pressure, thereby reducing the probability and amount of bubble formation due to these pressure changes. In emergencies a partial pressure of 0.6 bar of oxygen can be tolerated for over 24 hours, but this is avoided where possible. Carbon dioxide can also be tolerated at higher levels for limited periods. US Navy limit is 0.02 bar for up to 4 hours. Nitrogen partial pressure starts at 0.79 bar from the initial air content before compression, but tends to decrease over time as the system loses gas to lock operation, and is topped up with helium.

During pre-decompression hold time, the partial pressure of oxygen may be increased to 0.48 to 0.5 bar to provide a larger oxygen window. During decompression the oxygen partial pressure is maintained at this level until the oxygen fraction reaches 21% to 24%, after which it is retained at constant fraction until surfacing to reduce the fire hazard.

=== Deployment of divers ===
Typical bell with stage and conventional clump weight system

Deployment of divers from a surface saturation complex requires the diver to be transferred under pressure from the accommodation area to the underwater workplace. This is generally done by using a closed diving bell, also known as a Personnel Transfer Capsule, which is clamped to the lock flange of the accommodation transfer chamber and the pressure equalized with the accommodation transfer chamber for transfer to the bell. The lock doors can then be opened for the divers to enter the bell. The divers will suit up before entering the bell and complete the pre-dive checks. The pressure in the bell will be adjusted to suit the depth at which the divers will lock out while the bell is being lowered, so that the pressure change can be slow without unduly delaying operations.

The bell is deployed over the side of the vessel or platform using a gantry or A-frame or through a moon pool. Deployment usually starts by lowering the clump weight, which is a large ballast weight suspended from a cable which runs down one side from the gantry, through a set of sheaves on the weight, and up the other side back to the gantry, where it is fastened. The weight hangs freely between the two parts of the cable, and due to its weight, hangs horizontally and keeps the cable under tension. The bell hangs between the parts of the cable, and has a fairlead on each side which slides along the cable as it is lowered or lifted. The bell hangs from a cable attached to the top. As the bell is lowered, the fairleads guide it down the clump weight cables to the workplace.

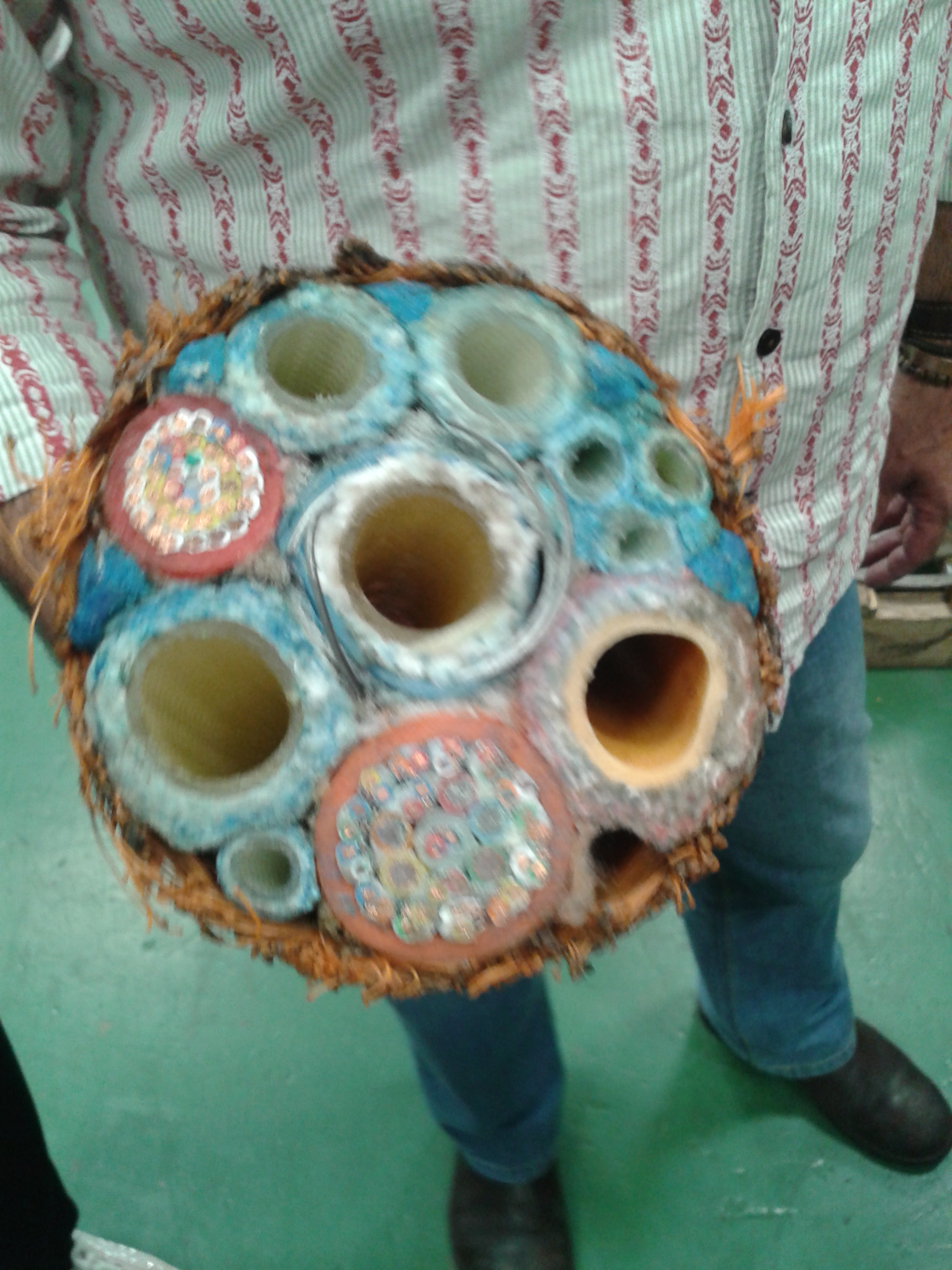
Section of an umbilical for a diving bell

The bell umbilical is separate from the divers' umbilicals, which are connected on the inside of the bell. The bell umbilical is deployed from a large drum or umbilical basket and care is taken to keep the tension in the umbilical low but sufficient to remain near vertical in use and to roll up neatly during recovery.

A device called a bell cursor may be used to guide and control the motion of the bell through the air and the splash zone near the surface, where waves can move the bell significantly.

Once the bell is at the correct depth, the final adjustments to pressure are made and after final checks, the supervisor instructs the divers to lock out of the bell. The hatch is at the bottom of the bell and can only be opened if the pressure inside is balanced with the ambient water pressure. The bellman tends the working diver's umbilical through the hatch during the dive. If the diver experiences a problem and needs assistance, the bellman will exit the bell and follow the diver's umbilical to the diver and render whatever help is necessary and possible. Each diver carries back-mounted bailout gas, which should be sufficient to allow a safe return to the bell in the event of an umbilical gas supply failure.

Breathing gas is supplied to the divers from the surface through the bell umbilical. If this system fails, the bell carries an on-board gas supply which is plumbed into the bell gas panel and can be switched by operating the relevant valves. On-board gas is generally carried externally in several storage cylinders of 50 litres capacity or larger, connected through pressure regulators to the gas panel.

Helium is a very effective heat transfer material, and divers may lose heat rapidly if the surrounding water is cold. To prevent hypothermia, hot-water suits are commonly used for saturation diving, and the breathing gas supply may be heated. Heated water is produced at the surface and piped to the bell through a hot-water line in the bell umbilical, then is transferred to the divers through their excursion umbilicals. The umbilicals also have cables for electrical power to the bell and helmet lights, and for voice communications and closed circuit video cameras. In some cases the breathing gas is recovered to save the expensive helium. This is done through a reclaim hose in the umbilicals, which ducts exhaled gas exhausted through a reclaim valve on the helmet, through the umbilicals and back to the surface, where the carbon dioxide is scrubbed and the gas boosted into storage cylinders for later use.

=== Lock-in, lock-out, and transfer under pressure ===
Lock-in (also lock in) is the process of passing from the outside ambient pressure to an internally pressurised space. In saturation diving the internal space of the accommodation is generally at a significantly higher pressure than the outside, and an airlock is needed as an intermediate compartment. Locking into the bell from the water is done at equal pressures so an intermediate airlock is not required. The opposite process, called lock-out (or lock out), is passing out of the internally pressurised space to ambient pressure surroundings. When the diver transfers from one hyperbaric chamber to another at an internal pressure that is different from the external ambient pressure, the procedure is called transfer under pressure.

=== Lock-on, lock-off, and the bell run ===
Lock-on (or lock on) is the airtight connection of one pressurised compartment to another, and lock-off (or lock off) is the separation of two connected pressurised compartments from each other. An intermediate airlock or trunking space is needed which is equalised from ambient pressure to internal pressure after the seal has been made, and vented to ambient before disconnection. A bell run is the time from when a pressurised bell is locked off the transfer chamber with divers in it to the time it is locked back on, but excluding the transfer under pressure.

=== Excursions from storage depth ===
It is quite common for saturation divers to need to work over a range of depths while the saturation system can only maintain one or two storage depths at any given time. A change of depth from storage depth during a dive is known as an excursion from storage depth, and divers can make excursions upwards (ascending excursion) and downwards (descending excursion), or both upwards and downwards (mixed excursion). The depth range between maximum and minimum excursion depth is called the excursion range or excursion window. Any excursion will impose both compression and decompression stress on the diver.

Excursions can be made within specific limits, based on the storage depth, without incurring a decompression stop obligation when returning to storage depth, just as there are no-stop limits when returning to surface pressure for surface oriented diving. The allowed depth change may be the same in both directions, or sometimes less upward than downward. Excursion limits are generally based on a 6 to 8 hour time limit, as this is the standard time limit for a diving shift. Each publisher of excursion limits also specifies the conditions under which their limits are valid, and these conditions vary. Some require a longer stabilisation period before the excursion, or between the excursion and start of decompression, others allow excursions on consecutive dives

These excursion limits imply a significant change in gas load in all tissues for a maximum excursion for 6 to 8 hours, and experimental work has shown that both venous blood and brain tissue are likely to develop small asymptomatic bubbles after a full shift at both the upward and downward excursion limits. These bubbles remain small due to the relatively small pressure ratio between storage and excursion pressure, and are generally resolved by the time the diver is back on shift, and residual bubbles do not accumulate over sequential shifts. However, any residual bubbles pose a risk of growth if decompression is started before they are eliminated. Ascent rate during excursions is limited, to minimize the risk and amount of bubble formation. Bubble formation during an excursion starts during or after the ascent phase of that excursion. An upward excursion is a decompression from saturation, analogous to an ascent to altitude from sea level, or a hypobaric decompression, followed by a return to initial pressure, while a downward excursion is analogous to a surface oriented dive, followed by a non-saturation decompression back to the initial pressure.

Inner ear decompression sickness is a relatively frequent symptom of DCS as a consequence of excursions in deep saturation dives, in comparison to its very low frequency in decompressions from bounce dives.

After some incidences of decompression sickness following the earlier excursion limits, the US Navy derived an empirical formula in 1989 for unlimited duration upward excursions from storage depth, using experimental data for storage depths from 36 to 1100 fsw.

UEXD = ((0.1574 × D1 + 6.197)^{0.5} - 1) ÷ 0.0787

where UEXD = Upward excursion distance,
and D1 = pre-excursion storage depth in fsw.

A minimum interval between maximum excursions of 48 hours was specified, and a minimum P_{O_{2}} of 0.42ATA for the breathing gas.

Commercial diving contractors have developed their own excursion limits based on experience in the field, and there are limits specified by other regulatory dive tables that are more conservative. Available data does not indicate that any of these procedures are inherently unsafe, or that upwards excursions are inherently more risky than downward, though mathematical modeling suggests that reducing the pre-decompression hold time is likely to result in higher risk of decompression sickness after a major excursion.

=== Decompression from saturation ===
When a diver breathes pressurized gas at depths greater than about 6 m, metabolically inert gases are needed in the mixture to dilute oxygen to non-toxic levels. These gases dissolve harmlessly into the body's tissues, but if they come out of solution too quickly during decompression, they form bubbles in the tissues which can cause decompression sickness ("the bends"), a harmful and potentially fatal condition. To prevent this, divers must follow a controlled decompression process, allowing these inert gases to be safely eliminated through the lungs. However, once a diver's tissues reach full saturation for a given gas mixture and pressure, no additional inert gas accumulates, meaning decompression time remains the same regardless of further exposure.

If divers work and live at pressure for a long period, and are decompressed only at the end of the period, the risks associated with decompression are limited to this single exposure. As decompression is done in the relative safety and comfort of a saturation habitat, it is done on a very conservative profile, minimising the risk of bubble formation, growth and the consequent injury to tissues. A consequence of these procedures is that saturation divers are more likely to suffer decompression sickness symptoms in the slowest tissues, whereas bounce divers are more likely to develop bubbles in faster tissues.

Saturation diving takes advantage of this by having divers remain in that saturated state. When not in the water, the divers live in a sealed environment which maintains their pressurised state; this can be an ambient pressure underwater habitat or a saturation system at the surface, with transfer to and from the pressurised living quarters to the equivalent depth underwater via a closed, pressurised diving bell. This may be maintained for up to several weeks, and divers are decompressed to surface pressure only once, at the end of their tour of duty. By limiting the number of decompressions in this way, and using a conservative decompression schedule the risk of decompression sickness is significantly reduced, and the total time spent decompressing is minimized. Saturation divers typically breathe a helium–oxygen mixture to prevent nitrogen narcosis, and limit work of breathing, but at shallow depths saturation diving can be done on nitrox mixtures. Most of the physiological and medical aspects of diving to the same depths are much the same in saturation and bell-bounce ambient pressure diving, or are less of a problem, but there are medical and psychological effects of living under saturation for extended periods.

Three major origins of commercial saturation procedures can be identified: US Navy, Comex and NORSOK, and there has been a tendency in commercial saturation diving to empirically adapt procedures according to the needs of the contractor and industry experience. Although there are differences due to history and local adaptation, the general tendency is towards considerable similarity in storage partial pressure of oxygen and decompression rates from relatively deep depths.

There are some common rules of accepted good practice: A final decompression is not started with an upward excursion; a stabilising period, the pre-decompression hold time, is used between an excursion dive and the start of decompression, during which the content of oxygen is raised from the partial pressure used for storage to the higher partial pressure used for decompression; and divers are encouraged to perform mild exercise during decompression.

Decompression from a saturation dive is a slow process. The rate of decompression typically ranges between 3 and 6 fsw (0.9 and 1.8 msw) per hour. The US Navy Heliox saturation decompression rates require a partial pressure of oxygen to be maintained at between 0.44 and 0.48 atm when possible, but not to exceed 23% by volume, to restrict the risk of fire.

US Navy heliox saturation decompression table
Depth	Ascent rate
1600 to 200 fsw (488 to 61 msw)	6 fsw (1.83 msw) per hour
200 to 100 fsw (61 to 30 msw)	5 fsw (1.52 msw) per hour
100 to 50 fsw (30 to 15 msw)	4 fsw (1.22 msw) per hour
50 to 0 fsw (15 to 0 msw)	3 fsw (0.91 msw) per hour

For practicality the decompression is done in increments of 1 fsw at a rate not exceeding 1 fsw per minute, followed by a stop, with the average complying with the table ascent rate. Decompression is done for 16 hours in 24, with the remaining 8 hours split into two rest periods. A further adaptation generally made to the schedule is to stop at 4 fsw for the time that it would theoretically take to complete the decompression at the specified rate, i.e. 80 minutes, and then complete the decompression to surface at 1 fsw per minute. This is done to avoid the possibility of losing the door seal at a low pressure differential and losing the last hour or so of slow decompression.

==== Intermediate storage depths ====
Operational requirements may require work to be done at depths which are further from storage depth then the safe limits for excursions. Multiple decompressions are considered to impose greater physiological stress on the divers, and reduce the advantages of saturation diving, so when necessary, they are generally limited to one of three profile types:

- a maximum decompression dose, equivalent to a specified total accumulated depth change, or
- a maximum total number of decompressions, regardless of the total change in pressure, generally one intermediate decompression and one intermediate compression, before final decompression, and known as the "W" profile, or
- not to allow further compression once decompression has been started. This is known as a "V" profile. Serial compressions with intermediate storage depths are allowed until the maximum depth, and decompression may occur in stages with intermediate storage depths, until final decompression to surface.

Decompression to an intermediate storage depth is called intermediate decompression.

==== Decompression following a recent excursion ====
Neither the excursions nor the decompression procedures currently in use have been found to cause decompression problems in isolation. However, there appears to be significantly higher risk when excursions are followed by decompression before non-symptomatic bubbles resulting from excursions have totally resolved. Starting decompression while bubbles are present appears to be the significant factor in many cases of otherwise unexpected decompression sickness during routine saturation decompression. The Norwegian standards do not allow decompression following directly on an excursion.

==== Emergency decompression ====
Emergency decompression is occasionally necessary due to unforeseen circumstances. By its nature there are few precedents and no clinical testing, and procedures tend to be adapted to circumstances. Procedures that have been used and worked have used a combination of one or more of the following options to accelerate decompression:

- An initial excursion
- Relatively high ascent rates
- Higher oxygen partial pressure than normally considered desirable to maximise the oxygen window.

Very little is known with confidence about how best to decompress from saturation in an emergency. A DMAC consensus document has been issued with tentative advice on possible procedures based on a balance of perceived risk. These procedures are not supported by experience or experimental work as there is very little of either, and constitute an educated guess at best. The risk of symptomatic decompression sickness is expected to increase as the rate of decompression increases, with earlier pain only symptoms, and more serious symptoms developing later or at higher decompression rates.

Existing decompression tables for accelerated saturation decompression from the US Navy, Duke Tables, and Comex procedures were considered inadequate for the emergency scenarios envisaged, although they are faster than the schedules in general commercial use.

Recommendations include the use of high oxygen partial pressures before and during decompression, with the actual partial pressure chosen depending on the predicted total duration of the decompression. Environmental factors such as dehydration, stress, gas contamination and confinement are considered likely to affect the risk. It is considered of high importance to maintain hydration at high levels. Intravenous administration may be appropriate.

The emergency decompression should be planned to make use of all the expected time available, at the slowest practicable rate, using the highest oxygen partial pressure appropriate for the time scale. Environmental control of the chamber should maintain temperature as closely as possible, and divers should move around enough to aid circulation, but not exercise strenuously. It is considered safer in an accelerated decompression to slow down the decompression, or stop and recompress if the situation changes than to start slow and accelerate decompression if the situation deteriorates.

=== Duration of exposure and surface intervals ===
The Diving Medical Advisory Council recommends that under normal circumstances the duration of a saturation dive, including compression and decompression, should not exceed 28 days, and the interval between saturation exposures should generally equal the duration of the previous exposure, with a cumulative exposure of not more than 182 days in any 12-month period. There is less guidance available regarding intervals between saturation and deep gas bounce diving or air diving.

== Saturation diving system ==
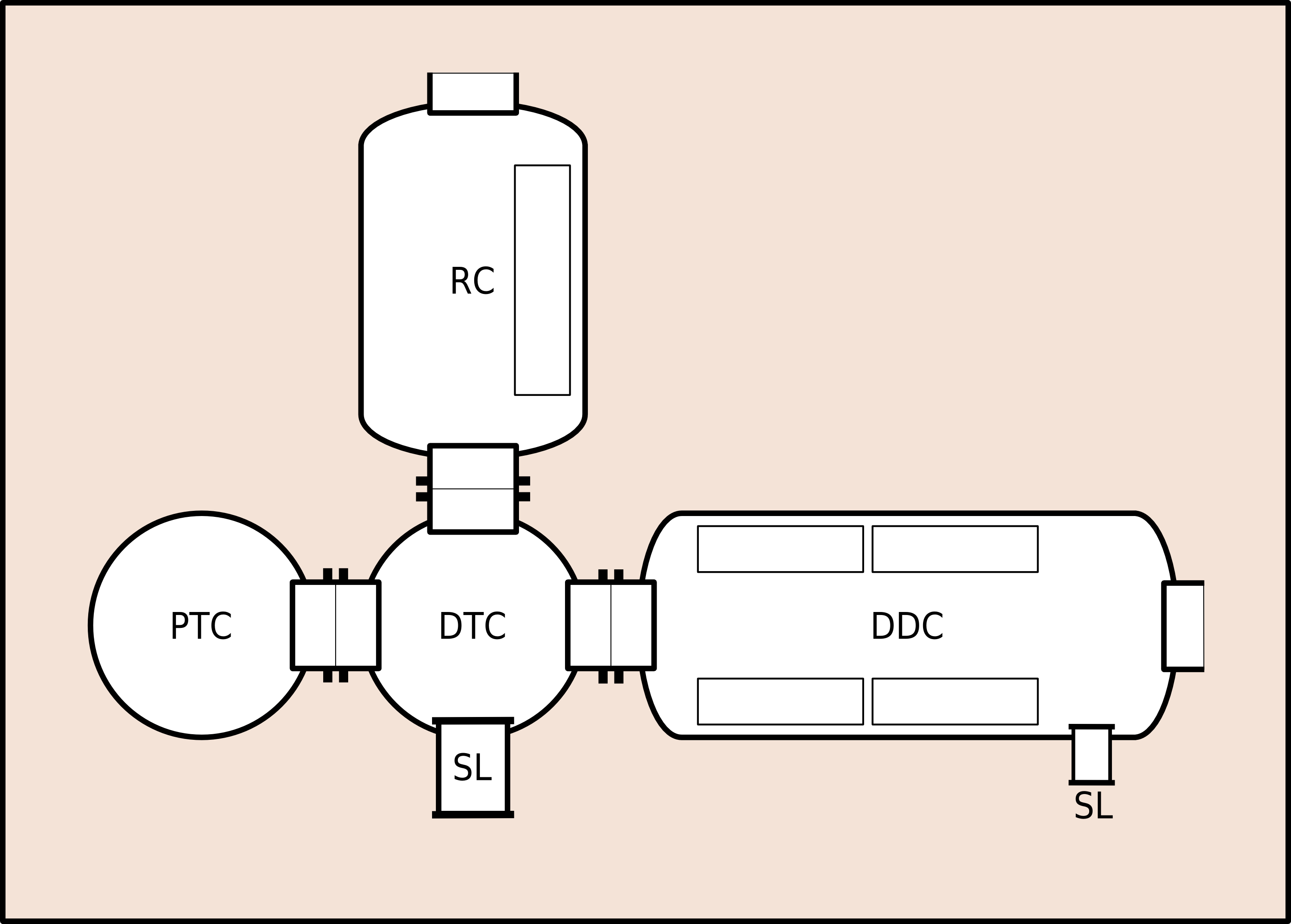
Schematic plan of a simple saturation system showing the main pressure vessels for human occupation DDC – Living chamber DTC – Transfer chamber PTC – Personnel transfer chamber (bell) RC – Recompression chamber SL – Supply lock

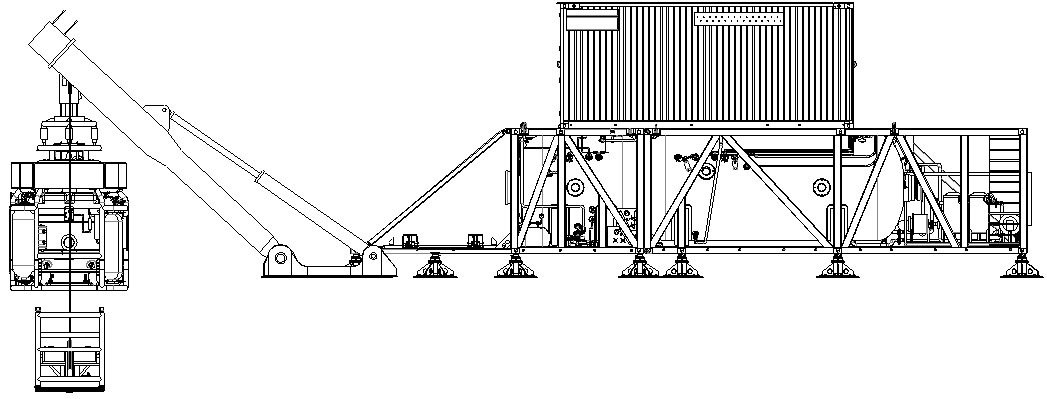
Illustration of US Navy Saturation Fly-away Decompression System

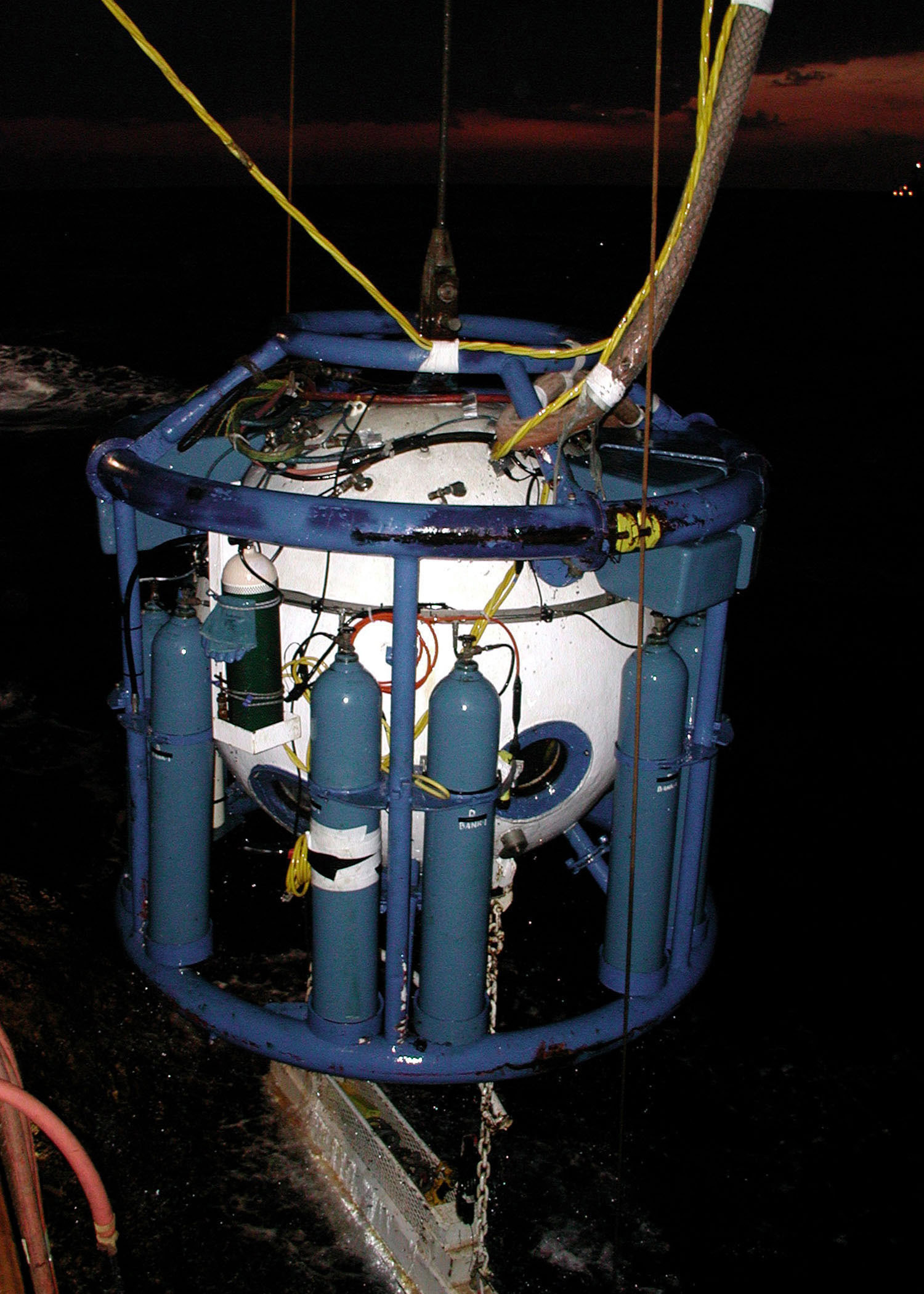
Personnel Transfer Capsule.

A saturation diving system is the combined and installed equipment required to support a saturation diving operation. It may be an underwater habitat, or more commonly for commercial diving operations, a hyperbaric habitat complex, known in the industry as a saturation spread, assembled on a surface platform, supported by a range of surface support equipment, some of which is common to other surface-supplied diving activities, and some of which is used mostly or only for saturation diving. Much of the equipment can be classed as life-support equipment, and some of it is required for emergency and rescue functions.

The basic components include living space accommodations for the divers when they are not diving, with sanitation facilities and a means of providing supplies to the occupants. There area also facilities for compression and decompression, treatment of dysbaric maladies, transfer under pressure between accommodation and transportation modules for transport between the accommodation and workplace, and for emergency evacuation. Units are interconnected by trunking and can be isolated by airlock doors.

Auxiliary and support equipment includes:

- The hyperbaric life support systems
- Breathing gas supply, distribution and recycling equipment: scrubbers, filters, boosters, compressors, mixing, monitoring, and storage facilities The divers use surface-supplied umbilical diving equipment, usually utilizing deep diving breathing gas, such as helium and oxygen mixtures, stored in large capacity, high pressure gas storage cylinders.
- Built-in breathing systems
- Chamber climate control system – control of temperature and humidity, and filtration of gas
- Instrumentation, control, monitoring and communications equipment
- Fire suppression systems
- Sanitation systems
- Bell launch and recovery system
- Control rooms for diving operations and saturation system life support
- Hyperbaric evacuation and rescue systems

== Depth records ==
The diving depth record for offshore diving was achieved in 1988 by a team of professional divers (Th. Arnold, S. Icart, J.G. Marcel Auda, R. Peilho, P. Raude, L. Schneider) of the Comex S.A. industrial deep-sea diving company performing pipe line connection exercises at a depth of 534 meters of sea water (msw) (1752 fsw) in the Mediterranean Sea during a record scientific dive.

In the real working conditions of the offshore oil industry, in Campos Basin, Brazil, Brazilian saturation divers from the DSV Stena Marianos (later Mermaid Commander (2006)) performed a manifold installation for Petrobras at 316 metres (1,037 ft) depth in February 1990. When a lift bag attachment failed, the equipment was carried by the bottom currents to 328 metres (1,076 ft) depth, and the Brazilian diver Adelson D'Araujo Santos Jr. made the recovery and installation.

In 1992, Greek diver Theodoros Mavrostomos of the Comex S.A. achieved a simulated 701 m (2,300 ft) of seawater depth in an on shore hyperbaric chamber. He took 43 days to complete the record experimental dive, where a hydrogen–helium–oxygen gas mixture was used as breathing gas.

The complexity, medical problems and accompanying high costs of professional diving to such extreme depths and the development of deep water atmospheric diving suits and ROVs in offshore oilfield drilling and production have effectively eliminated the need for ambient pressure manned intervention at extreme depths for some applications.

== Safety and risk ==
The primary purpose of saturation diving is to extend the useful working time for dives without increasing the exposure to risk of decompression sickness. There is also a secondary benefit that the reduced compression rates that are possible can reduce or avoid HPNS and compression arthralgia, making deeper dives practicable. There is a trade-off against other risks associated with living under high-pressure saturation conditions, and the financial cost is high due to the complex infrastructure and expensive equipment and consumables required. The risk of decompression sickness is reduced at the cost of increased risk due to being committed to the saturation environment for the duration of the decompression schedule associated with the storage depth. Hyperbaric evacuation from saturation is possible, but not universally available, and is logistically complicated. Having an evacuation system on standby is expensive.

Some notable saturation diving incidents include:

- Byford Dolphin diving bell accident – Explosive decompression of an occupied saturation chamber
- Drill Master diving accident – Fatal diving bell accident off Norway in 1974
- Star Canopus diving accident – Fatal offshore diving bell accident in 1978
- Stena Seaspread diving accident – Saturation diving bell incident with successful rescue in the North Sea in 1981
- Venture One diving accident – Saturation diving fatality in the North Sea in 1977
- Waage Drill II diving accident – Fatal saturation diving accident in the North Sea in 1975
- Wildrake diving accident – Fatal offshore diving accident in Scotland, 1979
- Bibby Topaz diving accident, documented by the 2019 film Last Breath

=== Incidence of decompression sickness ===
It is difficult to assess decompression risk in recent saturation decompressions as the data is generally not available, however it is known to be very uncommon since 2000, with some operators not having any cases in a 10-year period, while in the early days it was in the order of 1%. Saturation decompression is most likely to produce joint pain symptoms in the late stages of decompression. Venous gas bubbles are generally detected without symptomatic DCS, but this has also become rare.

=== Oxygen content of breathing gases ===
In nominal conditions, the human body functions normally with an oxygen partial pressure of about 0.21 bar. In saturation conditions a partial pressure of approximately double this value is chosen for the accommodations as it gives a large margin in case of accidental pressure loss – pressure in the chamber could drop by 50% and still support consciousness, allowing the divers to respond effectively to the emergency. This has actually happened, and the divers were able to close off necessary internal valves and pressure was duly restored. This partial pressure is approaching the upper limits of long term tolerability, so higher partial pressures can only be used for shorter exposures where there is a more urgent need. This is typically the case when the divers are in the water, particularly if there is an in-water depth excursion from storage depth, and during final decompression, where the efficacy of decompression is strongly dependent on the oxygen window. In an emergency decompression the partial pressure may be increased to a level where temporary lung injury may occur as this is likely to be less severe than decompression sickness.

=== Chamber hygiene ===
The closed, warm, humid, and hyperoxic internal environment of a saturation facility is conducive to microbial growth and associated infections, particularly of the external ear canal and minor soft tissue injuries. Potential sources include contaminated water supplies, food and equipment. Gram negative bacteria are a common problem. Good personal hygiene, adequate cleaning and disinfection of the chamber, and maintaining a relatively low humidity can reduce these risks. Routine microbial analysis can ensure that cleaning and disinfection is effective.

=== Minimum gas requirements ===
A saturation diving operation must be able to recover from any reasonably foreseeable contingency with minimum risk to the health of the divers, and one possible contingency is a substantial loss of gas from the accommodations. Sufficient backup gas must be provided to recompress and carry out a controlled decompression. Even with exhaled gas reclaim, there is unavoidable loss of diver and bell gas and the quantity of planned backup and bailout gas is also based on working depth and number of planned dives. Therapeutic gas supplies are also required in case of need, and their quantity is also based on the number of divers and maximum operational depth.

=== Training and registration ===
Training of saturation divers generally takes place at commercial diving schools registered to train saturation divers, and having the required infrastructure and equipment. Diver training standards for saturation divers are published by a small number of organisations, and there is some international recognition of equivalence. The prerequisites for starting training are generally that the diver is already qualified as a bell diver and has a specified number of dives and hours of experience since qualifying.

Training of saturation divers generally starts with a competent and at least moderately experienced surface oriented bell diver and concentrates on the additional knowledge and skills required for saturation diving. There is a large additional technical component related to the specialised equipment. For the South African Department of Labour Class I Diver, the additional knowledge and skills include:

- A basic knowledge of the history of mixed gas and saturation diving,
- An understanding of modular and diving support vessel based saturation diving systems, saturation life-support systems including environmental control, diver heating systems, sump drains and hyperbaric toilet discharges
- An understanding and practical operating skills for closed diving bells, their standard and emergency equipment, handling systems, bell and excursion umbilicals and personal diving equipment, and their testing and maintenance requirements,
- An understanding and practical operating skills for transfer under pressure and closed bell diving from 4-point moored and dynamically positioned vessels.
- An understanding of gas supplies and saturation consumables, including minimum gas requirements, gas transfer pumps, gas blending, and gas reclaim systems,
- An understanding and practical experience in committing divers to saturation, and pressurisation.
- An understanding of split level saturation diving.
- Knowledge of the minimum personnel requirements for saturation diving operations and the responsibilities of the diving team members, including the superintendent, supervisor, life support supervisor, life support technician, support and systems technicians, gas man, and the bellman and diver, and experience and skills as diver and bellman.
- Knowledge of saturation decompression procedures, emergency saturation decompression and hyperbaric evacuation and practical experience of standard procedures and simulated emergency procedures.
- Certification as a level 2 first aider, with additional knowledge of saturation hygiene, saturation first aid requirements and the deep diving compression disorders, high pressure nervous syndrome and compression arthralgia.

== Working conditions ==
The living and working conditions of the saturation diver are unusual. There are shifting demands and large contrasts. The diver is required to be adaptable to the variations in work and coworkers, and to do so for several weeks at a time. The future of the occupation is uncertain and linked to the oil and gas industry. The work environment and living conditions on contract tend to be monotonous, but they are interspersed with periods of leisure. There is a conflict between family commitments and extended work periods in relative isolation, but in the continuous close proximity with a small group of co-workers. The job is prestigious, the pay is good, and there are fairly long periods of leisure between jobs. The occupation needs mental endurance, flexibility, and willingness to adapt and learn. Maintaining personal routines may help in maintaining mental health. The quality of the team can have a large effect on the members. The ability to get along well with each other and mutual trust are important to cooperation and efficiency in a group who depend on each other for safety and sometimes for survival. A sense of humour is an advantage, though there is a tendency for this to be relatively dark, possibly due to the high risk environment.

== Economics ==
Offshore saturation diving was developed as a tool for a job. The procedures and equipment evolved to meet the demand for the specific work, and in the development years of offshore petroleum extraction, money was available for research and development. As oilfield diving operations became deeper, the ratio of productive time on the job compared to decompression reduced for surface oriented diving, and the possibility of improving the cost benefit balance by reducing overall unproductive and relatively high risk decompression time became more financially attractive. Saturation diving incurs significant costs and provides significant benefits. The use of observation and work class ROVs has been integrated with saturation diving, which has improved efficiency and safety.

The initial investment includes the purchase and installation of specialized equipment and the infrastructure required to support the system. Operational expenses of running the system are also large, and include skilled personnel in an intermittently competitive and volatile economic environment heavily dependent on current oil price. Regular maintenance and occasionally repair, replacement, and upgrading, is essential to ensure that the equipment remains safe and efficient and sufficiently flexible to adapt to changing needs and standards. The cost of the appropriate gas mixtures for breathing and pressurization is high, and availability of helium is variable.

The large capital outlay required to set up a saturation system made it desirable to utilise the hardware as much as possible, which encouraged the use of specialist contractors. The often fatal or crippling consequences of human error or equipment failure made health and safety concerns important. The offshore location of much of the work made industry self-regulation possible and desirable, but occasionally government intervention was necessary to prevent excessive cutting of corners for profit forcing competitors to follow the lead of the least ethical practices.

Although the costs are high there are several compelling benefits that can justify the investment for some types of operations. A big advantage is increased operational efficiency. Productive working time is greatly enhanced when the decompression time is moved to the end of the job, allowing workers to spend more time on the task, particularly on complex projects, where knowledge and experience on the particular task is retained within the working group.

The controlled saturation living environment, although stressful and relatively uncomfortable, is less stressful and uncomfortable than the surface oriented alternative, and the safety advantage of a single slow decompression minimises health related hazards and risks.

Saturation diving also allows work at depths that would not be possible by surface oriented diving due to health limits on the speed of compression to those depths.

Of the 3,300 commercial divers employed in the United States in 2015, 336 were saturation divers. Special training and certification is required, as the activity is inherently hazardous, and a set of standard operating procedures, emergency procedures, and a range of specialised equipment is used to control the risk, that require consistently correct performance by all the members of an extended diving team. The combination of relatively large skilled personnel requirements, complex engineering, and bulky, heavy equipment required to support a saturation diving project make it an expensive diving mode, but it allows direct human intervention at places that would not otherwise be practical, and where it is applied, it is generally more economically viable than other options, if such exist.

== In arts and media ==
For saturation diving in fiction, see:

- The Abyss – 1989 film by James Cameron
- Dykket (The Dive) (1989) – Norwegian action thriller film by Tristan de Vere Cole
- Goliath Awaits – 1981 American made-for-television mini-series by Kevin Connor
- The Neptune Factor – 1973 film by Daniel Petrie
- Pioneer (Pionér) – 2013 Norwegian thriller film
- Pressure (2015 film) – Action film by Ron Scalpello
- Sphere – 1987 novel by Michael Crichton
- Siren's Rest (2025 video game) – DLC for the video game Still Wakes the Deep

In 2019, Netflix released Last Breath, a documentary which tells the story of Chris Lemons, a saturation diver who survived 38 minutes without a surface-supplied breathing gas supply after the vessel's dynamic positioning system failed during a storm, setting off a red alert. The two working divers started returning to the bell, but the ship drifted from the work site, dragging the bell with it, and his umbilical was snagged and severed under the load. He was able to return to the workplace using his bailout set, so was easily found by an ROV from the ship, but his bailout gas was insufficient for the time it took to get the ship back on position for a rescue attempt from the bell. Although presumed dead by support crew aboard the vessel, he was recovered by the second diver and successfully resuscitated in the bell. It has been hypothesised that his survival may have been a result of hypothermia, high partial pressure of oxygen in the bailout gas, or a combination. The ROV video footage shows him twitching while unconscious, which is consistent with an oxygen toxicity blackout.

== See also ==
Saturation diving contractors:

- Acergy – Former offshore engineering company
- Boskalis – Dutch dredging and heavylift company
- Compagnie maritime d'expertises (Comex) – French offshore diving contractor
- Smit International – Dutch maritime company
- Subsea 7 – Luxembourgish-domiciled subsea engineering, construction, and services company
- Technip – Company in project management, engineering, and construction for the energy industry

Regulatory and advisory bodies, registration authorities:

- Association of Diving Contractors International (ADCI) – Non-profit organization for promoting standards and knowledge for commercial diving
- Australian Diver Accreditation Scheme (ADAS) – Australian based international occupational diver accreditation organisation
- Department of Employment and Labour – Department of the South African government responsible for matters related to employment
- Diving Medical Advisory Council (DMAC) – Independent organisation of diving medical specialists from Northern Europe
- Health and Safety Executive (HSE) – Health and safety body in Great Britain
- International Diving Regulators and Certifiers Forum (IDRCF) – International forum of professional diver accreditation organisations
- International Diving Schools Association (IDSA) – Organisation to develop common standards for commercial diver training
- International Marine Contractors Association (IMCA) – International trade association for the marine contracting industry
- United States Navy Experimental Diving Unit (NEDU) – US military research and development unit

Manufacturers of saturation diving equipment:

- James Fisher & Sons – British shipowner and provider of marine engineering services
- Kirby Morgan – Brand of underwater diving equipment
- Diving helmet#Manufacturers

Major projects which used saturation diving

- Salvage of HMS Edinburgh (16)
- Salvage of Kursk submarine disaster

Alternative technology:

- Surface oriented diving – Underwater diving in which the diver starts and finishes at surface pressure
  - Bell bounce diving – Surface oriented diving using a closed bell
  - Transfer under pressure diving (TUP diving) – Surface oriented diving from a closed bell and a chamber for decompression
- Atmospheric diving suit – Articulated pressure-resistant anthropomorphic housing for an underwater diver
- Lock-out submersible – Submersible with an airlock and diving chamber from which divers can be deployed
- Remotely operated underwater vehicle – Tethered underwater mobile device operated by a remote crew
