= Finger rafting =

Compression overlapping of floating ice cover in alternating overthrusts and underthrusts

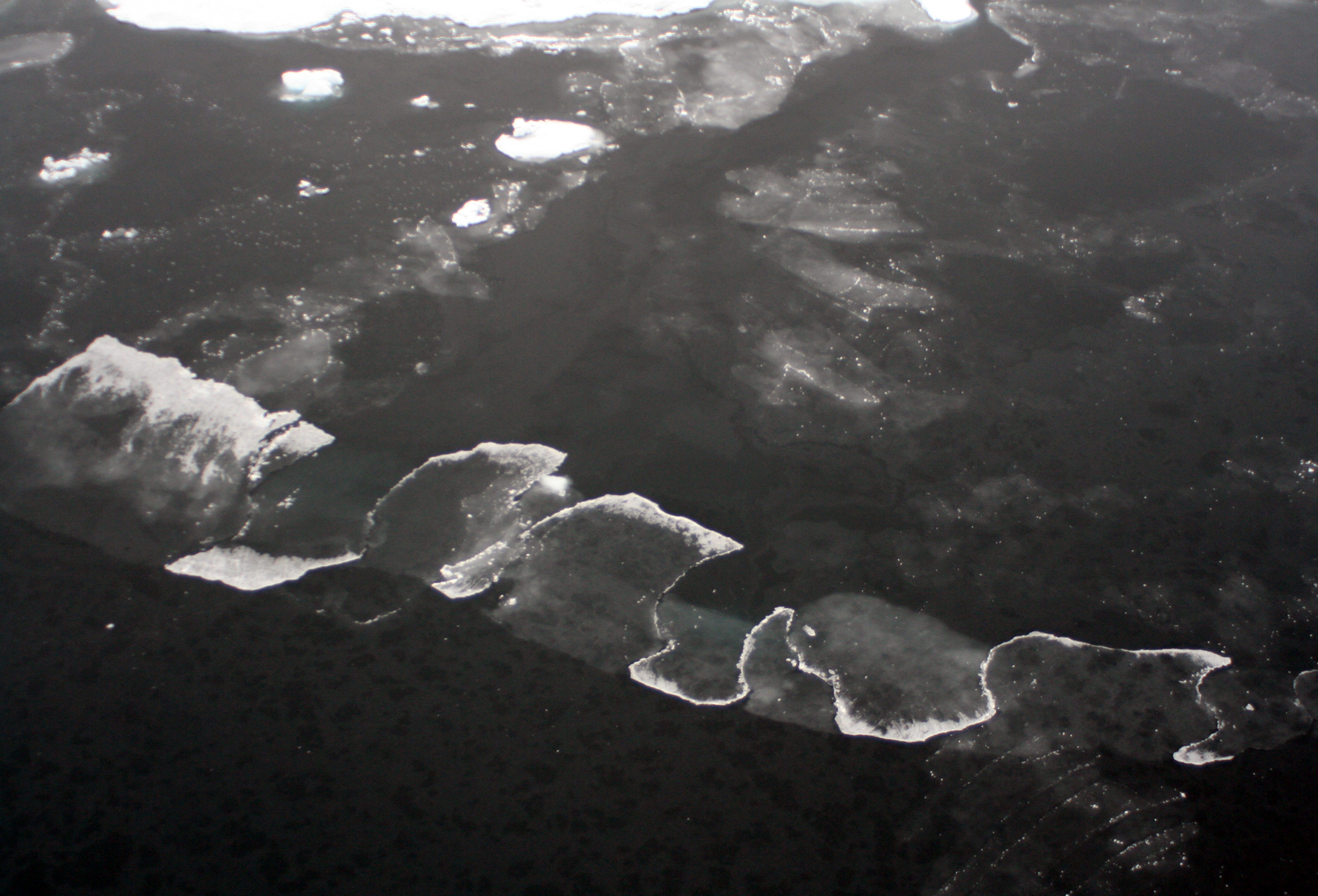
Aerial photograph showing two thin ice sheets (made of nilas) that are moving toward each other. Along the length of the contact between the two sheets, segments where one sheet climbs onto the other alternate with others where it is the other way around. The lighter areas are where the ice thickness has doubled due to the overlapping process. This pattern is known as finger rafting. In many cases, it is highly systematic.

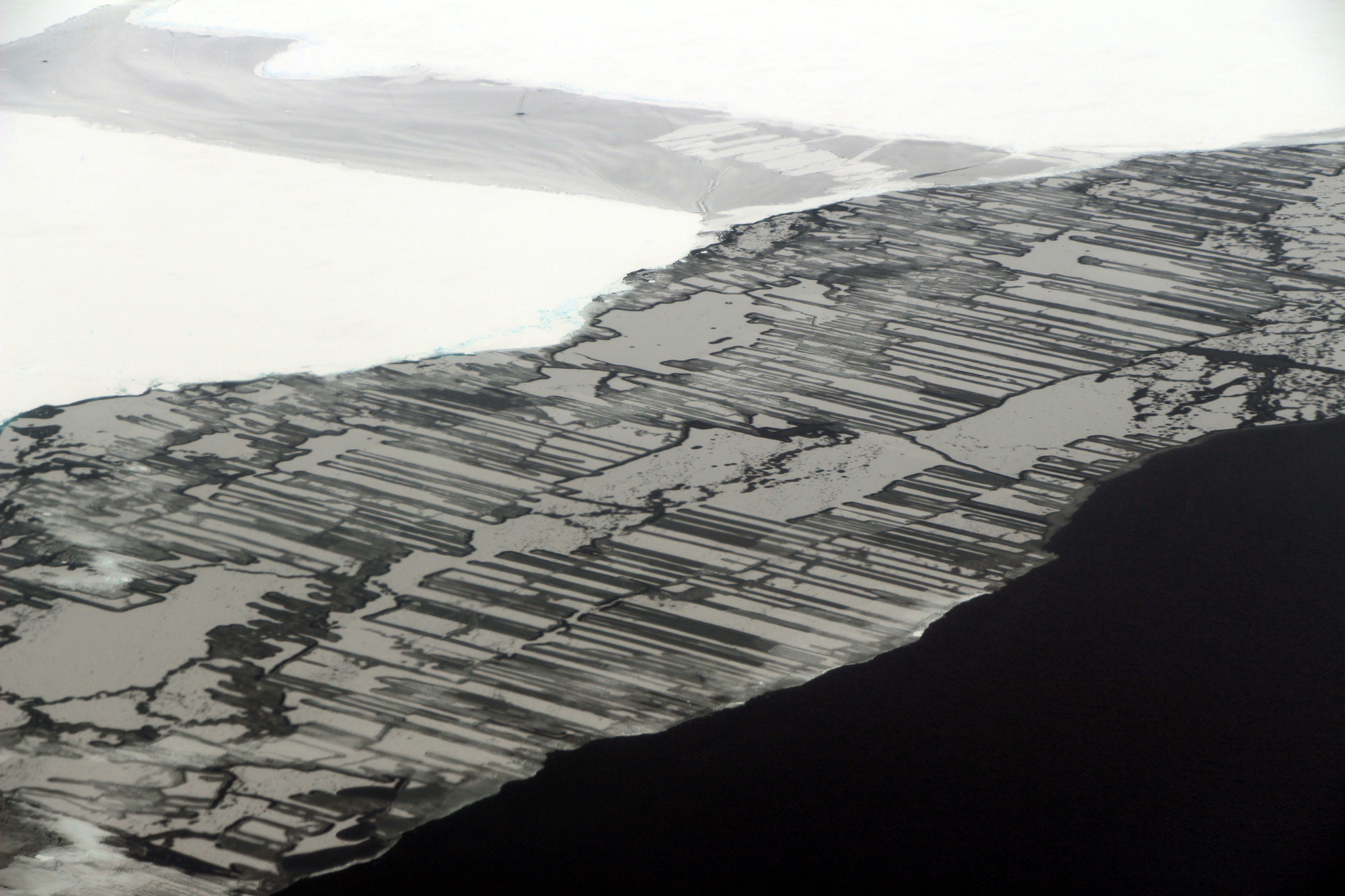
Finger rafting in the Weddell Sea, Operation IceBridge photo, 2017.

Idealized three-dimensional representation of finger rafting, It occurs when two thin ice sheets converge toward each other.

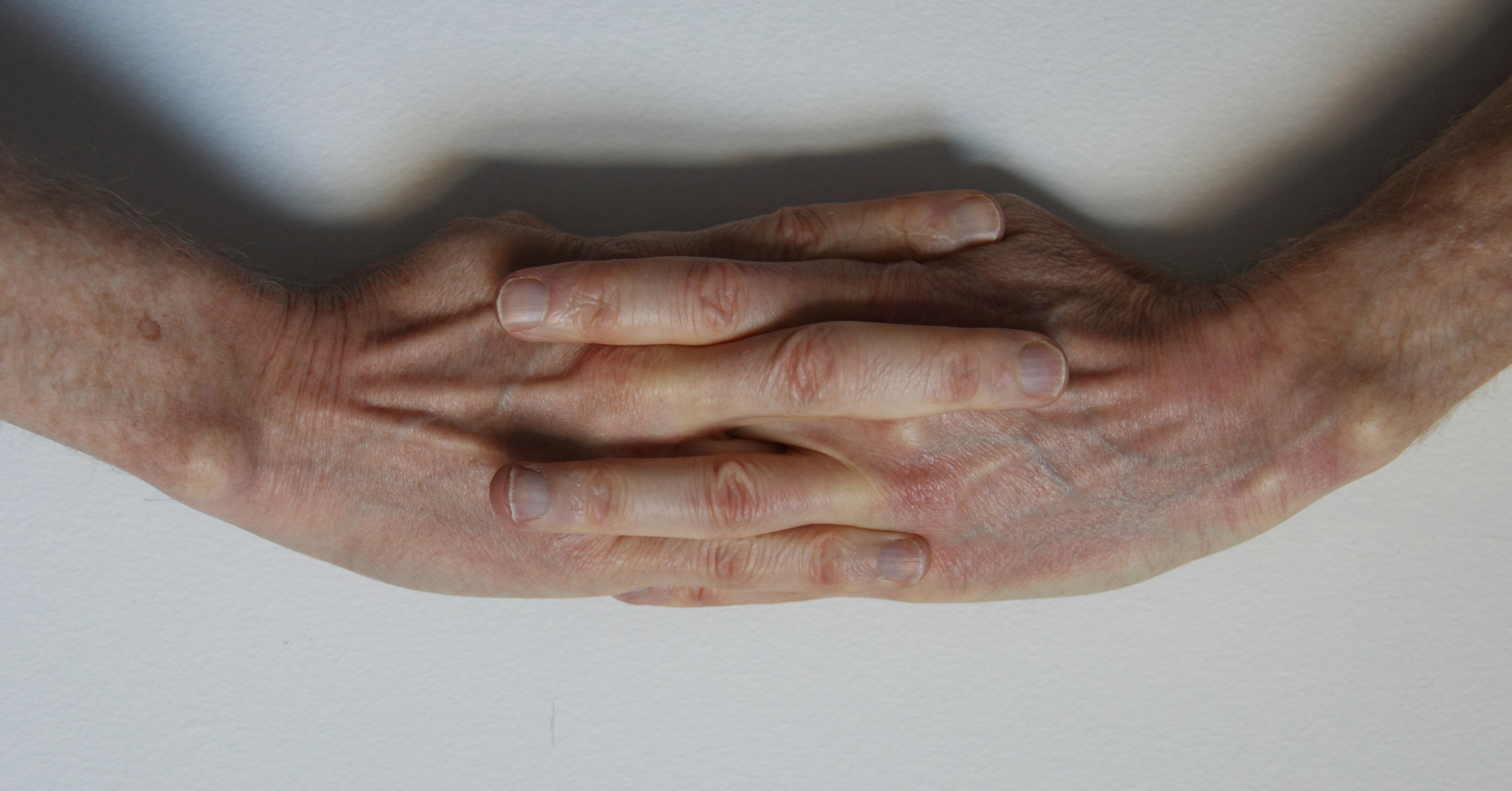
Finger rafting derives its name from its resemblance to the interlocking of fingers. Note that the fingers shown here are not interlaced normally (with all ten fingers showing from the top), but interlaced as in finger rafting (with only five fingers visible from either the top or bottom). (Note: Whereby the first finger in one hand overlies the same finger in the other hand), the second finger in one hand underlies the second finger in the other hand, the third fingers do as the first fingers, etc.)

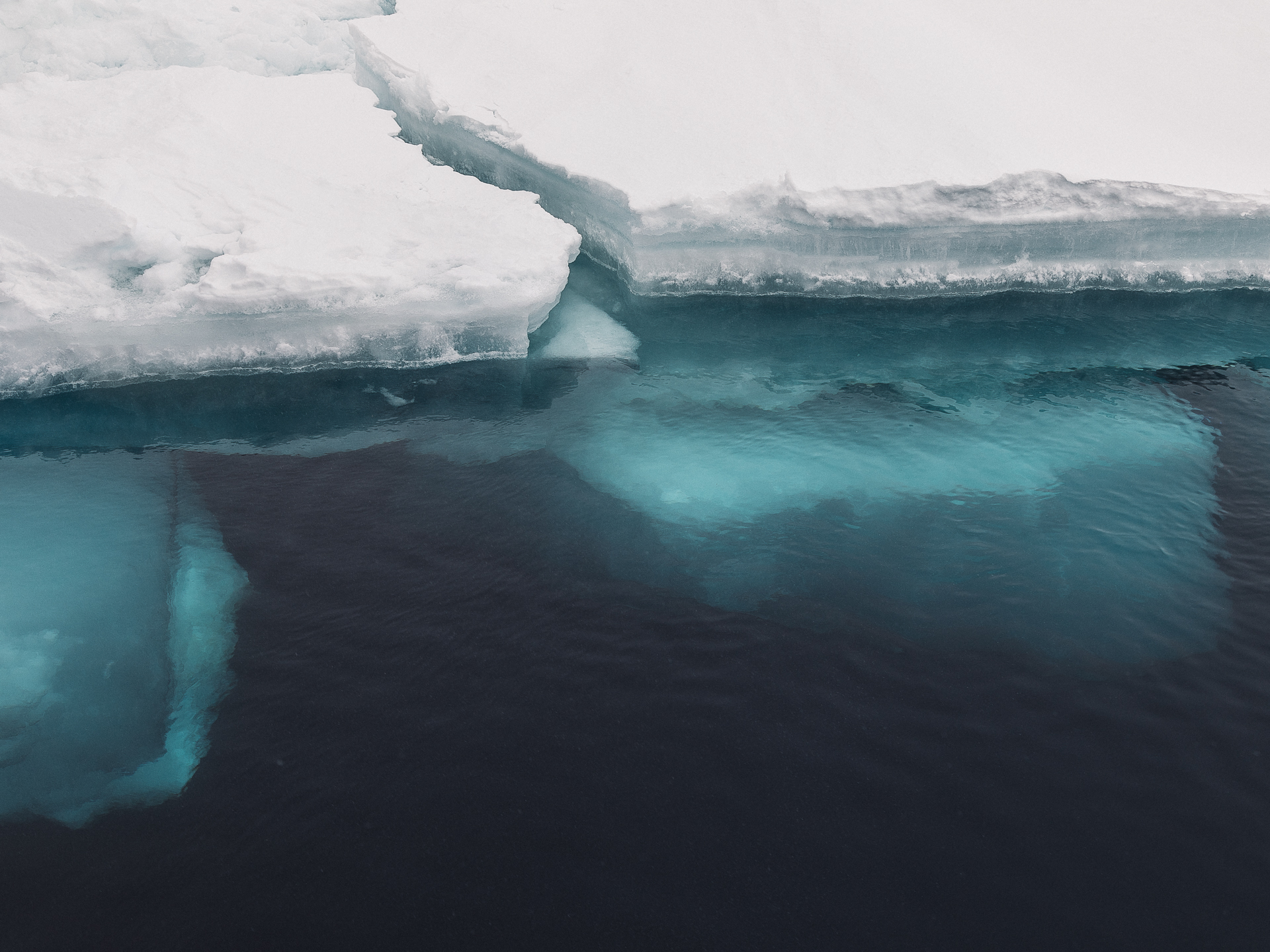
Rafted ice observed during MOSAiC Expedition in June 2020.

Finger rafting develops in an ice cover as a result of a compression regime established within the plane of the ice. As two expanses of sea ice converge toward another, one of them slides smoothly on top of the other (it is overthrusted) along a given distance, resulting in a local increase in ice thickness. The term finger rafting refers to the systematic alternation of interlocking overthrusts and underthrusts involved in this process. Such a pattern derives its name from its resemblance to the interlocking of fingers.

== The process ==
Rafting, also called telescoped ice, is most noticeable when it involves new and young ice, but also occurs in ice of all thicknesses. The process of finger rafting as such is commonly observed inside a lead, once a thin layer of ice (at the nilas stage) has formed. Although this ice is typically very weak (it is unable to support its own weight outside the water), it contains a lot of brine and is also relatively warm, since being that thin, its temperature is near that of the water. Rafting is accompanied with rapid draining of the brine inside the overlying ice sheet. This brine acts as a lubricant, significantly reducing the friction between the two sheets during overthrusting. Such a mechanism, and the fact that the upper surface of nilas is already slippery, account for overthrust distances in excess of 100 metres (330 ft) (a length-to-thickness ratio of 1000 to one). (Note: According to this source, finger rafting is also possible in lakes and rivers even though this ice is non saline, but only if it is very thin, i.e. less than 2 centimetres (0.79 in).)

== Rafting versus ridging ==
Rafting and ridging are two possible responses expected from the interaction between two converging ice sheets or floes. The term 'ridging' refers to the process of ridge formation, involving the breaking up of the ice sheet into distinct blocks (which does not happen during rafting). The reason why breaking happens is that, as the ice thickness increases, the bending moment exerted on the upper surface of the ice exceeds its tensile strength. In other words, the ice is no longer flexible enough to withstand the overthrust event without breaking.

== Maximum thickness for rafting ==
A theoretical formula has been used to estimate the maximum thickness an ice sheet can have in order to be able to raft. This thickness ($h_{rf}$) is

$$h_{rf}=\frac{14.2(1-\nu^2)}{\rho_wg}\frac{\sigma_t^2}{Y}$$

where $\nu$ is Poisson's ratio, $\sigma_t$ is the tensile strength of the ice, $\rho_w$ is water density, Y is the Young's modulus of sea ice and g is the gravitational acceleration. What this equation shows is that, assuming a representative tensile strength of 0.65 MPa, the maximum thickness for rafting to occur is in the range of 0.2 metres (7.9 in).

== See also ==
- Lead (sea ice)
- Pressure ridge (ice)
