= Lead (sea ice) =

Fracture that opens up in an expanse of sea ice

Schematic representation of a lead developing in a sea ice cover. This drawing assumes very low air temperatures, with rapid refreezing of the water inside the lead.

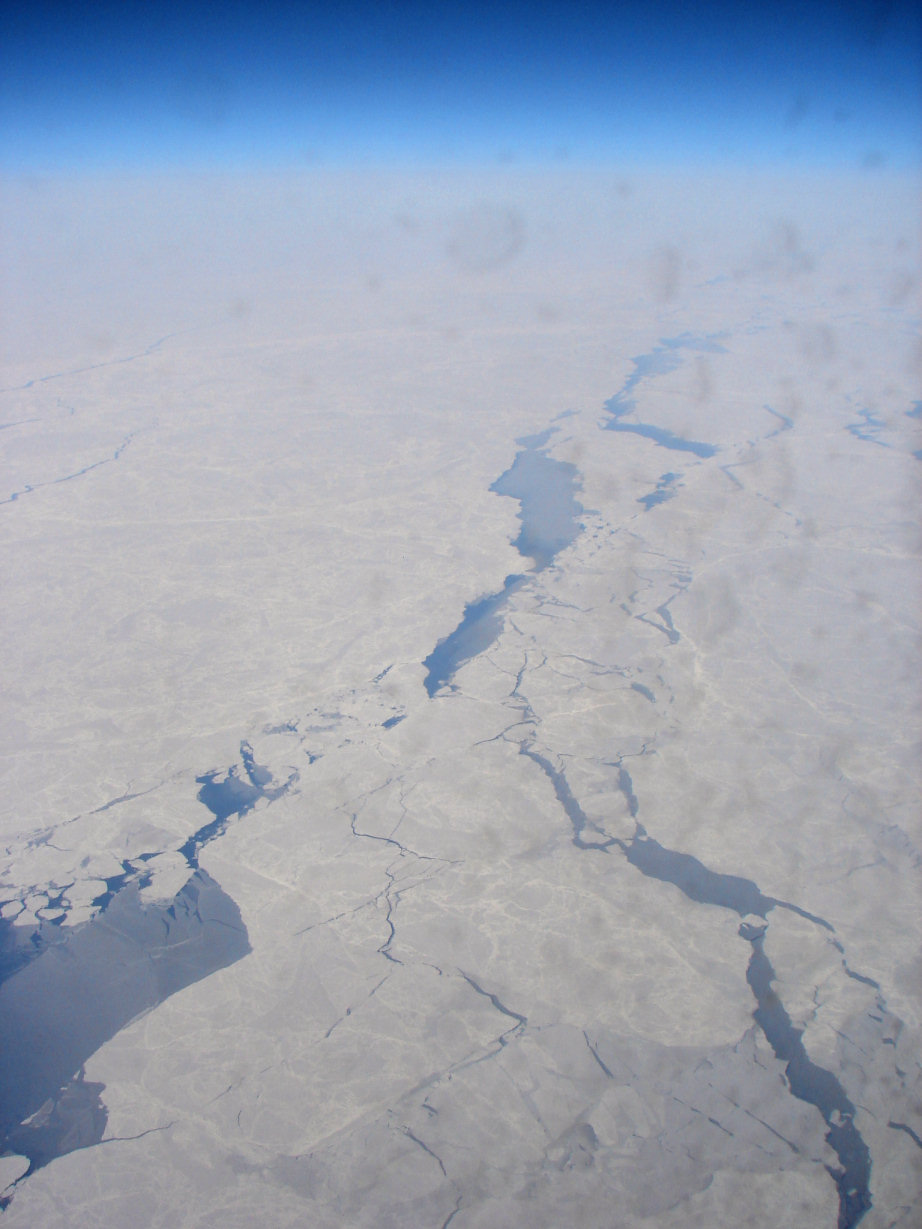
Aerial view of the Chukchi Sea between Chukotka and Alaska, displaying a pattern of leads. Much of the open water inside those leads is already covered by new ice (indicated by a slightly lighter blue color).

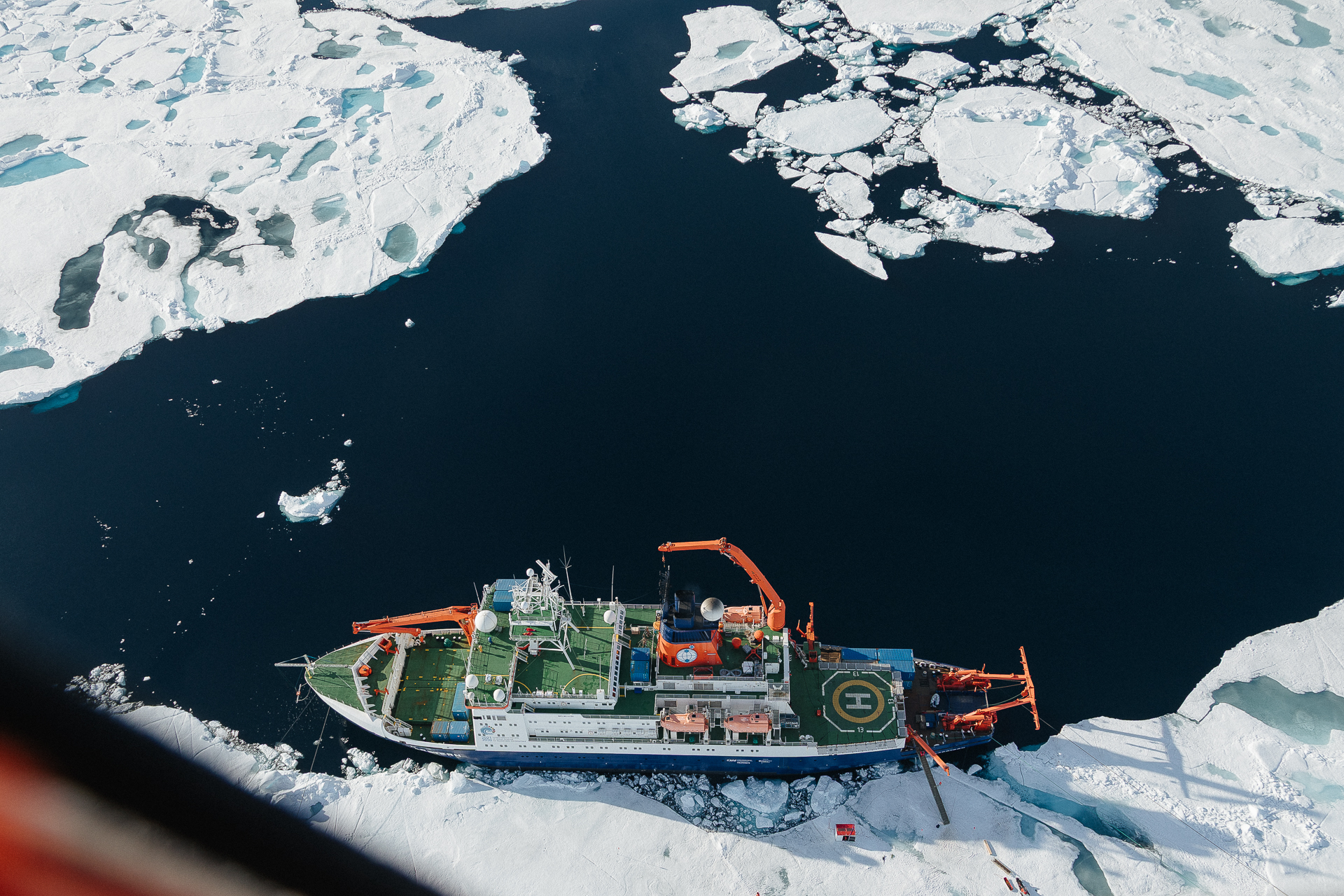
Aerial view of Arctic pack ice near the research vessel Polarstern, showing sea-ice leads.

A lead (/ˈliːd/, rhymes with "need") is a large fracture within an expanse of sea ice, defining a linear area of open water that can be used for navigation purposes. Leads vary in width from meters to hundreds of meters. As is the case for polynyas (another sea ice feature involving open water), leads allow the direct interaction between the atmosphere and the ocean, and are important for Arctic sea ice ecology. Additionally it has been lately found that ice leads contribute significantly to the amount of mercury deposited onto surface and leaked into the ocean. If the air is cold enough (typically in the winter), the water within a lead quickly refreezes, such that in many cases, leads are partly or entirely covered by a thin layer of new ice.

== Differences between leads and polynyas ==
Unlike polynyas, which tend to occur, and remain, at a given location, leads are transient features that can form anywhere in an ice-covered ocean. Moreover, while the origin of polynyas is linked with either warm air current circulation from the coastline or a warm water upwelling, the driving force behind lead formation is a state of stress, either wind- or current-induced, within the plane of the ice. Lead formation is therefore tied in with synoptic-scale weather patterns, typically lasting a few days. Also, because the open water within a lead tends to quickly refreeze, the contribution of leads to heat exchange and water vapour output to the atmosphere is significantly less than that of polynyas, where refreezing of the open water is prevented.

== Formation ==
Sea ice is often classified according to whether or not it is attached (or frozen) to the shoreline. If attached, it is called land fast ice. Otherwise, it is called drift ice and is free to move with currents and winds. This is why leads typically belong to the drift ice zone. They are seen as a stress relieving mechanism, in response to divergent current flows or the effects of wind. Leads are cracks or fissures that initiate inside an otherwise continuous sea ice cover, and open up progressively afterward. They are linear features, though generally not rigorously straight, as they may comprise any number of short offsets at an angle with the general trend of the initial crack. This crack may cut right across both thin and thick ice. Because leads are associated with the initial break up of an ice cover, they open the way to various dynamic processes that can take place afterward, involving the interaction between individual floes, such as the formation of pressure ridges. Depending on the state of stress within the drift zone, leads may also close up. As the two sides converge back toward each other, this can lead to finger rafting of the new ice inside the lead.

== Ice formation in leads ==
Once a crack occurs within the ice cover and begins to expand to make up a lead, the open water inside the lead is exposed to cold air temperatures and will freeze. Because wind fetch inside a lead is typically very short, wave action is considerably reduced. Ice growth, therefore, takes place in a low-energy regime environment. Following a stage of frazil ice formation, which sometimes results from seeding by snow crystals, the resulting thin ice skim is followed by the growth of congelation ice. In windier regions, as in the Southern Ocean, frazil ice accumulation may occur along the downwind side of leads. If the ice on that side is thin, the frazil may be driven below that ice (resulting in a complex interlayering pattern). Leads affect global water circulation. As the ice begins to form inside a lead, it incorporates some of the salt in the seawater but rejects most of it similar to the growth of other ice types. This brine then sinks, inducing convective processes in the water column below. During warm air intrusions, refrozen leads can accumulate a substantial amount of drifting snow, resulting in over 50% snow mass fraction of lead ice and potential contribution to snow losses in the spring season.

== Types ==
There are a few types of leads:

- A blind lead is a lead that is closed off – both ends terminate within the drift ice zone.
- A flaw lead is a lead that forms between the fast ice zone and the drift ice zone.
- An open lead is a lead that connects two bodies of open water – the term is also used for a lead in which open water is found.
- A shore lead is a lead that forms between the drift ice zone and the shore.

== See also ==
- Drift ice – Sea ice that is not attached to land
- Fast ice – Sea ice connected to the coastline
- Finger rafting – Compression overlapping of floating ice cover in alternating overthrusts and underthrusts
- Polynya – Area of unfrozen sea within an ice pack
- Sea ice – Outcome of seawater as it freezes
