= Frazil ice =

Collections of ice crystals in open water

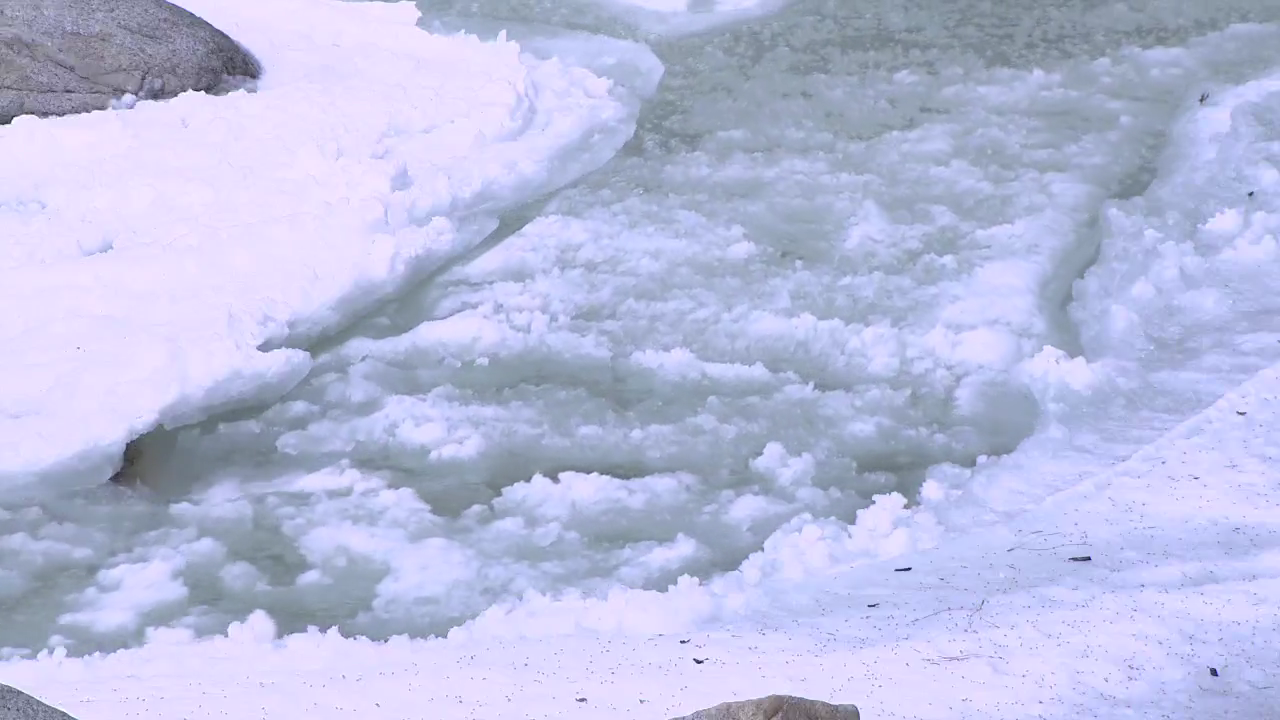
Frazil ice in Yosemite Creek

Video of frazil ice in Yosemite National Park

Frazil ice is a collection of loose, randomly oriented ice crystals a millimeter and sub-millimeter in size, with various shapes, e.g., elliptical disks, dendrites, needles and of an irregular nature. Frazil ice forms during the winter in open-water reaches of rivers as well as in lakes and reservoirs, where and when the water is in a turbulent state, which is in turn induced by the action of waves and currents. Turbulence causes the water column to become supercooled, as the heat exchange between the air and the water is such that the water temperature drops below its freezing point (in order of a few tenths of °C or less). The vertical mixing associated with that turbulence provides enough energy to overcome the crystals' buoyancy, thus keeping them from floating at the surface. Frazil ice also forms in oceans, where windy conditions, wave regimes and cold air also favor the establishment of a supercooled layer. Frazil ice can be found on the downwind side of leads and in polynyas. In these environments, that ice can eventually accumulate at the water surface into grease ice.

Frazil ice is notorious for blocking water intakes, as crystals accumulate and build up on the intake trash rack. Such blockages negatively impact water supply facilities, hydropower plants, nuclear power facilities, and vessels navigating in cold waters, and can lead to unexpected shutdowns of the facility or even collapse of the trash rack.

== Formation ==
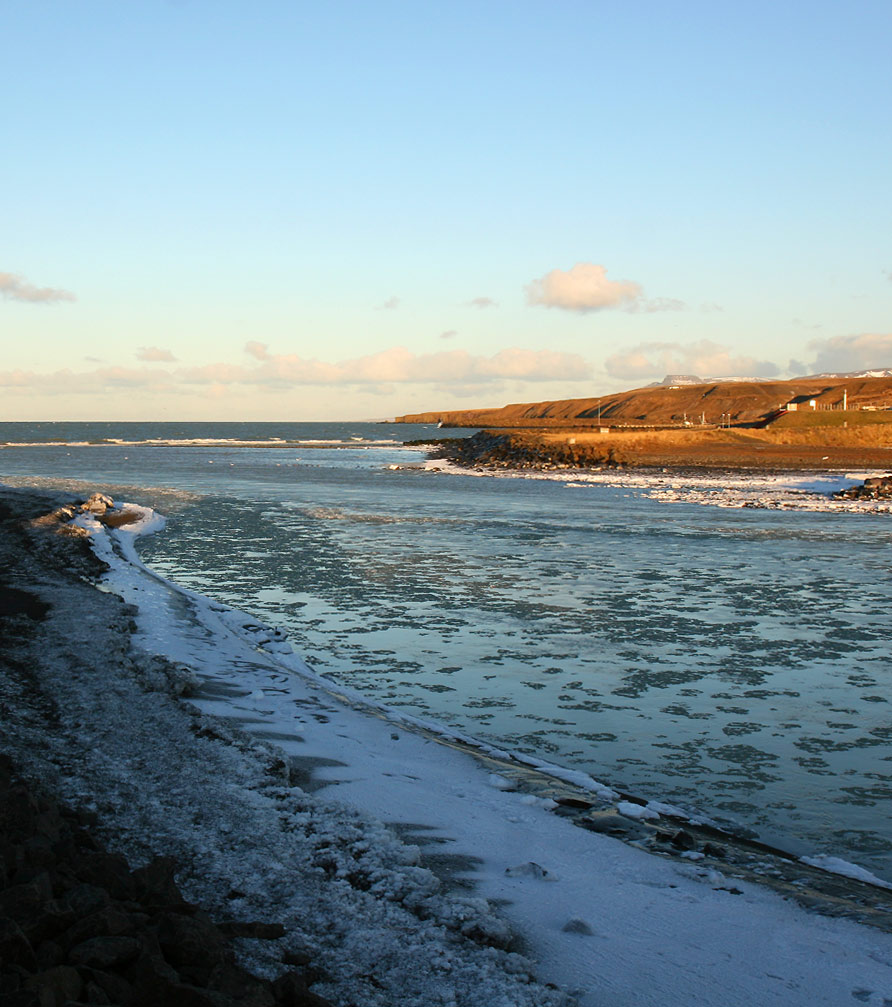
Frazil ice flowing in the mouth of the river Blanda in Iceland

When the water surface begins to lose heat rapidly, the water becomes supercooled. Turbulence, caused by strong winds or flow from a river, will mix the supercooled water throughout its entire depth. The supercooled water will already be encouraging the formation of small ice crystals (frazil ice) and the crystals get taken to the bottom of the water body. Ice generally floats, but due to frazil ice's small size relative to current speeds, it has an ineffective buoyancy and can be carried to the bottom very easily.

Through a process called secondary nucleation, the crystals quickly increase in number, and because of their supercooled surrounding, the crystals will continue to grow. Sometimes, the concentration is estimated to reach one million ice crystals per cubic meter.

As the crystals grow in number and size, the frazil ice will begin to adhere to objects in the water, especially if the objects themselves are at a temperature below water's freezing point. The accumulation of frazil ice often causes flooding or damage to objects such as trash racks. Since frazil ice is found below the surface of water, it is difficult to detect its formation.

Usually, the frazil ice accumulates on the upstream side of objects and sticks to them. As more frazil is deposited, the growth will extend upstream and increase in width until the point where the frazil ice accumulations bridge together and block the water. As more and more water flows against this block, the pressure on the upstream side increases and causes a differential pressure (difference in pressure from the upstream side and the downstream side). This will cause the growth of the bridge to extend downstream. Once this happens, flooding and damage is likely unless otherwise prevented.

Frazil ice has also been demonstrated to form beneath temperate (or "warm-based") glaciers as water flows quickly downhill and supercools due to a rapid loss of pressure. This "glaciohydraulic supercooling" process forms an open network of platy ice crystals that can effectively trap silt from the sediment-laden water that flows beneath glaciers and ice sheets. Subsequent freezing and recrystallization can result in a layer of sediment-rich ice at the base of the glacier which, upon melting at the terminus, can result in significant accumulation of sediment in moraines. This phenomenon has been verified by elevated concentrations of tritium — produced by nuclear weapons testing and therefore almost entirely absent in ice frozen before 1945 — in the basal ice of several glaciers (signifying young ice) and the observation of rapid growth of ice crystals around water discharge vents at glacier termini.

== Control ==
There are several ways to control frazil ice build up. They include suppression, mechanical control, thermal control, vibration, materials selection and damage mitigation.

=== Suppression ===
Frazil ice forms in supercooled water which occurs because the surface water loses heat to cooler air above. Suppression is the idea of insulating the surface water with an intact, stable ice cover. The ice cover will prevent heat loss and warm the supercooled water that might have already formed. Sufficient area needs to be covered in order for this method to work, but it is still unknown what is meant by "sufficient". The St. Lawrence River is explicitly managed to create "flow conditions that help form a stable ice cover" to prevent frazil ice and subsequent ice jams.

=== Mechanical control ===
These methods include stabilizing freeze without restricting water flow, such as implementing weirs and ice booms, installing water jets to break up any accumulation that might occur, and using manual labour to rake away the accumulation. This final method is often not preferred because of high labour costs, cold, wet and late night working conditions. Back flushing is another technology that uses the idea of cancelling out the differential pressure caused by the frazil ice accumulation. This technology creates a high pressure on the downstream side of objects to reverse the differential pressure.

=== Thermal control ===
These methods either heat the structures in the water to prevent frazil ice adhesion or heat the water to prevent frazil ice from forming in the first place. When heating the structure, it must be heated to a temperature above freezing. Electrical resistance heaters have been found to work well, but these have potential safety problems. Installing hollow tubes in the structures through which steam or warm water is pumped also works, but this method has been judged as uneconomical to operate. Other active methods are also available. Certain industrial processes, for example power production, draw water supplies for plant-cooling purposes. The warmed water byproducts thus produced, otherwise discharged as waste, can be released at locations of potential frazil accumulation, raising the water temperature by 0.1–0.2 °C (0.18–0.36 °F), often enough to prevent supercooled water from developing. Alternatively, the waste water may instead be recirculated to directly warm surfaces prone to frazil ice accumulation. Both these methods of warm water re-use require precise calculation of volumes, flow and placement, and relative water temperatures, in order to be reliable.

=== Vibration ===
Although still in the experimental stages, blasting with dynamite is one form of vibrational control that will break loose any frazil ice accumulation. The charge must be precise such that the ice breaks, but surrounding structures and environment are not harmed. Safety of the blasting also is important and nearby residents might complain about sound pollution. For all these reasons, this method is not often used, except as an emergency last resort.

=== Materials selection ===
Man-made structures are often the objects to which frazil ice adheres. As such, the choice of materials for these structures should include consideration of ice adhesion. Steel structures, for example will rust, and rust-to-ice adhesion is very strong. Choosing a material with lower adhesion such as plastic, fiberglass, graphite or even an epoxy paint coating on the steel will reduce the adhesion probability. Although adhesion will still occur, using such materials makes other methods, such as raking, easier.

=== Damage mitigation ===
Damage could be reduced by protecting designated flood regions with mechanical structures.

== See also ==
- Grease ice
