= Trash rack =

Machine for cleaning waterways

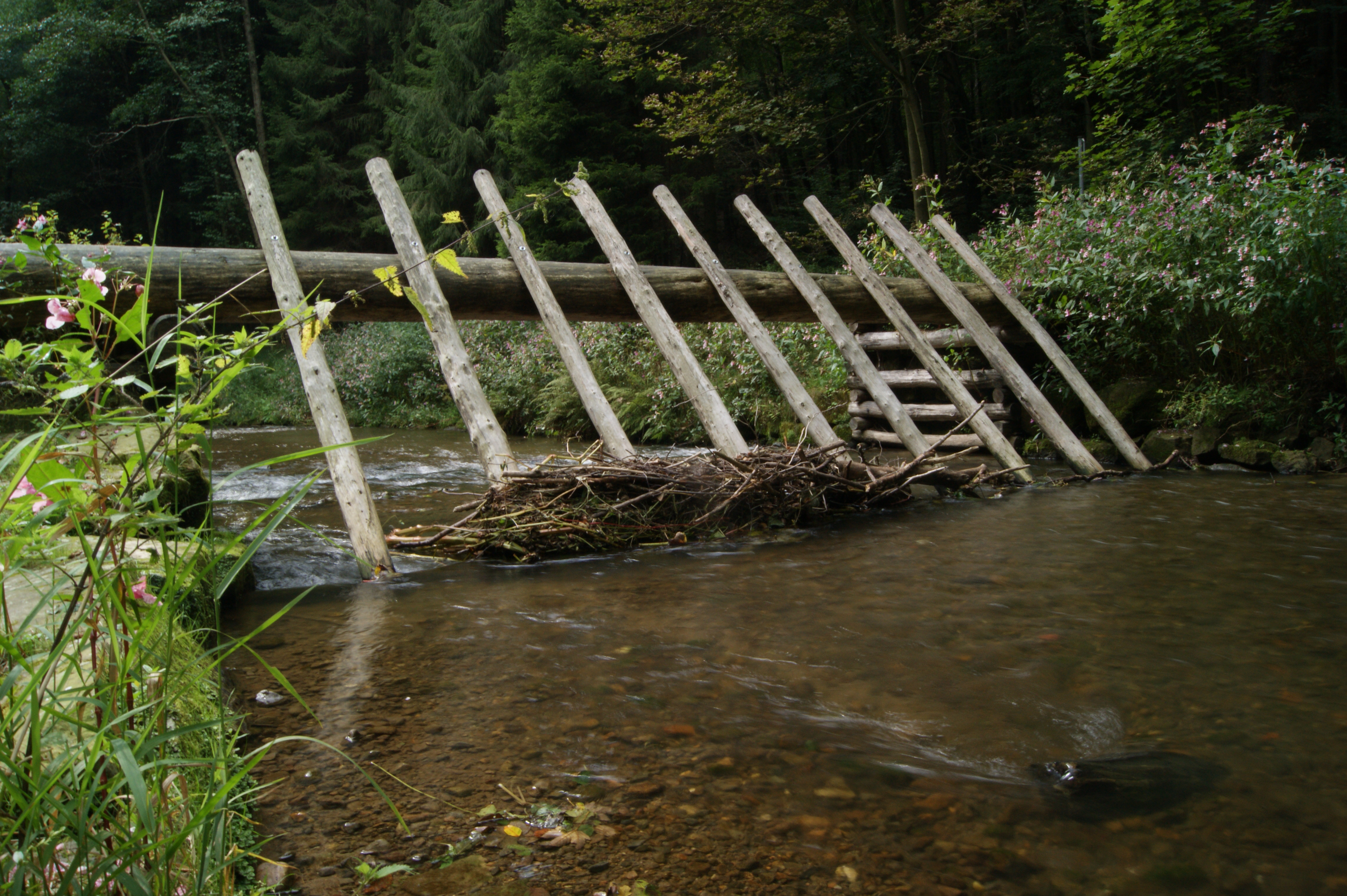
Simple wooden rake

A trash rack (US) or debris screen is a wooden or metal structure, frequently supported by masonry, that prevents water-borne debris (such as logs, boats, animals, masses of cut waterweed, etc.) from entering the intake of a water mill, pumping station or water conveyance. This protects water wheels, penstocks, and sluice gates from destruction during floods. They are sometimes fitted to storm drain inflows and outflows to prevent debris from entering a natural watercourse. Other names used are trash screen (US) or debris grille.

Trash racks composed of vertical wooden strakes separated by narrow gaps are very common and perform extremely poorly. Metal gratings are sturdier and can have narrower spacing, and angling the trash rack properly can allow some self-cleaning from the action of the water. Modern trash racks as used by hydroelectric plants can incorporate such advanced features as wedge-wire screens, the Coanda effect, and cleaning robots.

In waterways with large amounts of floating debris, various permanently installed "trash rakes" may be required to reduce the labor required for regular cleaning.

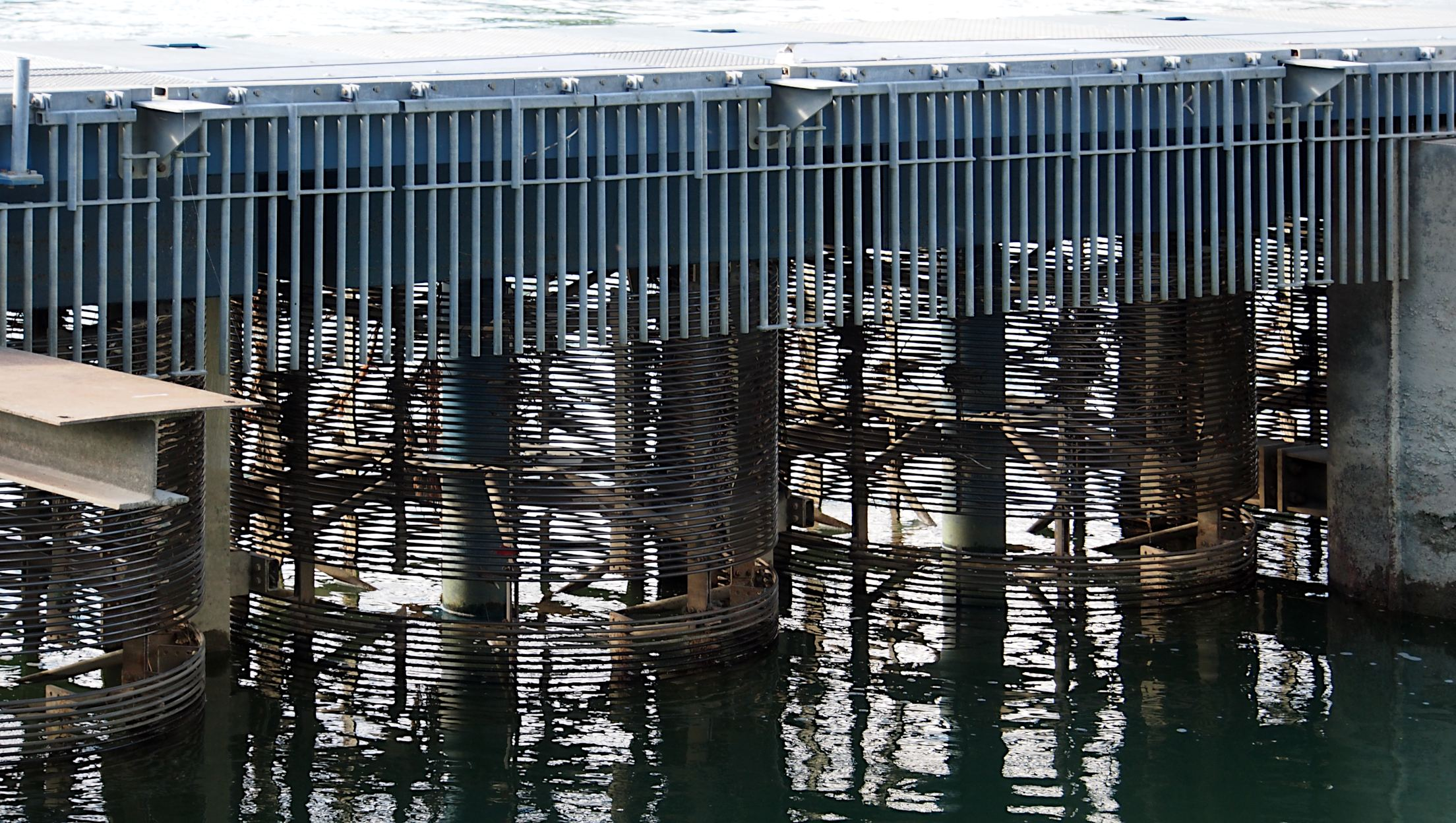
Rotating rake cylinders

Trash racks are designed for water velocity of around 2 feet/second (0.6 metres/second) to prevent excessive energy loss due to the head loss across the trash rack. Close spacing keeps out more small floating debris or fish, but may plug up easily with frazil ice in cold climates.
