= Kirby Morgan =

Brand of underwater diving equipment

Kirby Morgan is the brand name of a line of underwater diving equipment manufactured by the Kirby Morgan Corporation based in California. It is also the common term for Kirby Morgan Dive Systems Inc. The brand is best known for professional diving breathing apparatus, particularly lightweight demand helmets and band masks.

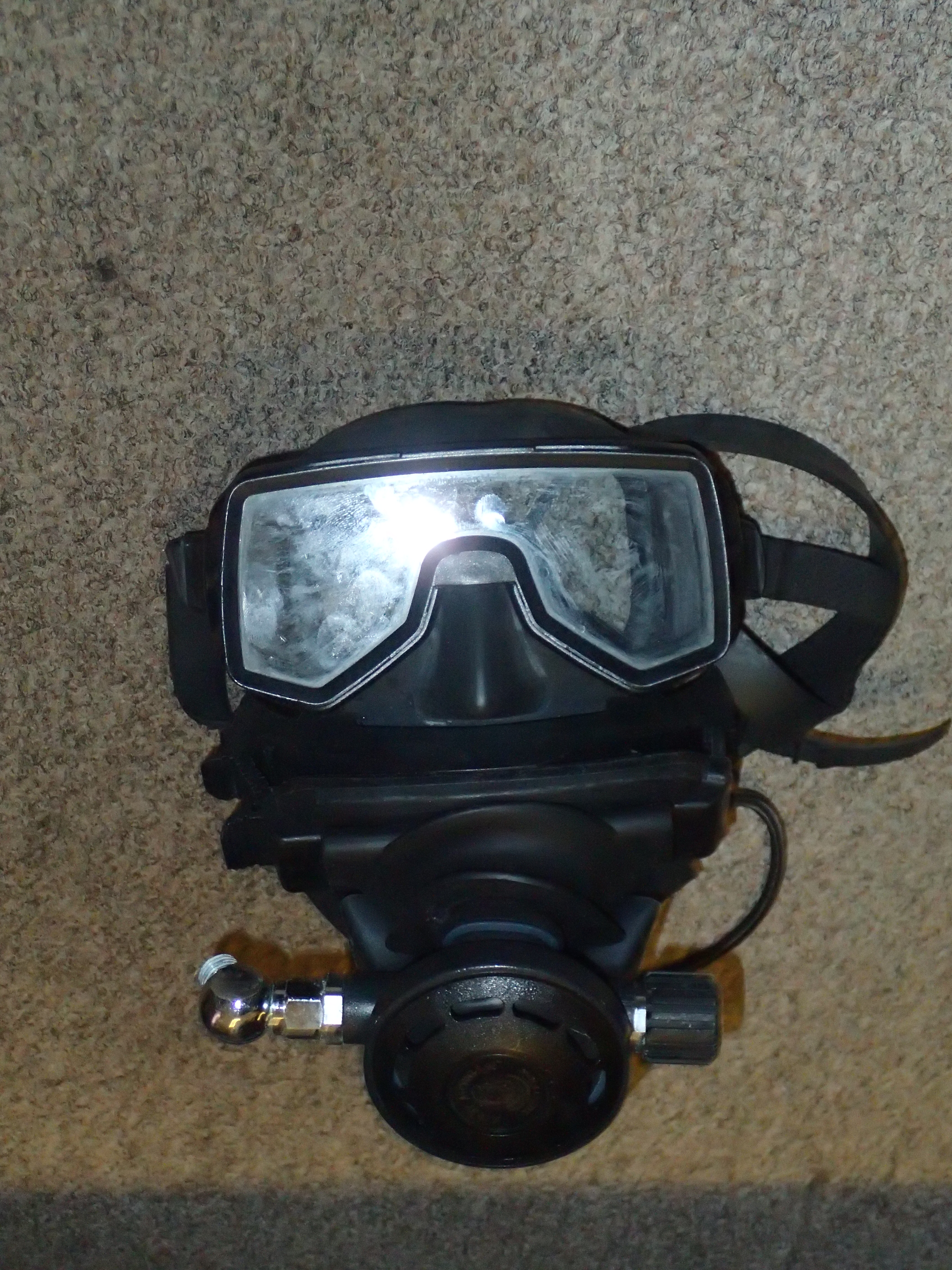
Kirby Morgan KM-48 Supermask

== History ==
Kirby Morgan Corporation formed in 1966. Bob Kirby sold his share in Kirby Morgan to Bev Morgan in 1967. Later it changed its name to Deep Water Development in 1969 and Diving Systems International in 1977. Currently Kirby Morgan Dive Systems, Inc., is based in Santa Maria, California.

The first Bob Kirby mask from the early 1950s was developed from designs by Henry Hanson, a US Navy shipyard welder who had made several of his own full-face diving masks in stainless steel, as the commercially available models (Widolf) did not fit him well. The mask was for abalone diving, and the simple oval, high volume shell was in stainless steel, The rubber seal was quite narrow and fitted round the face. The faceplate was full height circular.

MMX-1 The Morgan Mask, Experimental 1, built by Bev Morgan in 1964 was a rigid framed full face free-flow mask in fiberglass, with a similar face seal to the Kirby mask.The faceplate was full height broad oval. Four were built.

The Morgan Mask, Experimental 2. was a demand supplied full-face mask based on the MMX-1 using a Sportsways regulator second stage, and a reduced height faceplate with a straight lower edge to provide space for the DV. Two were made in 1961.

The Morgan Mask 3 was similar in structure to the MX-2, but had a side valve block (free-flow? bailout?) at the right temple and used a Scuba-pro demand regulator. The faceplate has a concave lower edge for improved field of vision downwards. Twenty of these masks were made in 1964.

In 1965 Kirby and Morgan formed a partnership to produce the Kirby Morgan Commercial Air Helmet, using a copper shell spun by Hummel Products Company, Santa Barbara, and a breastplate from Yokohama Diving Apparatus Company. The helmet used edge-threaded plexiglass lights (Footnote: Viewports on older style diving helmets were referred to as lights, a traditional term.) sealed on O-rings for better field of vision, and the noise levels were reduced.

Also in 1965, Kirby and Morgan developed the Kirby Morgan Commercial Helium Helmet, based on the design of their commercial air helmet, with a cylindrical scrubber canister permanently mounted on the back of the helmet. the canister was loaded with a pre-packed carbon dioxide absorbent cartridge from the inside of the helmet, and used a venturi injector system to drive gas recirculation through the cartridge, similar in concept to the US Navy Mk V Mod 1 Heliox helmet. This helmet and the Kirby Morgan commercial air helmet were later produced by Yokohama Diving Apparatus from 1966 to 1990.

== Product line ==
Kirby Morgan produces underwater breathing apparatus for the professional diving market. Most is open circuit surface supplied equipment, but there are a few exceptions which are intended for helium reclaim and closed circuit scuba.

=== Diving helmets ===
Kirby-Morgan is a major supplier of lightweight demand helmets to the commercial diving industry. They produce a range of helmets with fibreglass and stainless steel shells. As of 2024 the range includes:

- KM Superlite 17A/B/C. The 17 series is claimed to be the most widely used commercial diving helmet in the world. (fibreglass) The KM 17B is also used by the US Navy as the Mk21 helmet.
- Superlite 27 (compact, fibreglass)
- Kirby Morgan 37 (fibreglass) and 37SS (stainless steel)
- Kirby Morgan 47 (fibreglass}
- Superlite 57 (fibreglass, no longer in production)
- Kirby Morgan 77 (stainless steel, no longer in production)
- Kirby Morgan 97 (stainless steel)
- Kirby Morgan Diamond is a lightweight demand helmet with a stainless steel shell intended for use with a helium reclaim system or direct venting to the atmosphere through an exhaust gas return line, which gives excellent protection against a contaminated environment.

Models no longer produced, but still supported include:

- Kirby Morgan 47

=== Band masks ===
A band-mask is a type of full-face diving mask with a rigid and relatively heavy frame, to which a face seal is clamped by a metal band. The mask is secured to the diver's head by a multi-strapped rubber harness known as the spider, which clips to buttons mounted on the band. Fitting a band-mask is quicker and easier than fitting a helmet, and band masks are popular for use by stand-by divers. Kirby-morgan produces two models of band-mask, the KMB-18 A/B and KMB-28B, which are very similar and are distinguished mainly by the material of the frame. The KM-18 has a frame of hand laid fibreglass composite, and the KB-28 has a frame of injection moulded thermoplastic. The US Navy MK 1 Mask is a Navy specification of the Kirby Morgan band mask.

=== Full-face masks ===
Kirby-Morgan makes a unique configuration of full-face mask, the KM-48 Supermask, which has some characteristics of a half mask, while retaining many of the advantages of the full-face mask: The rigid plastic main frame of the mask has a rubber skirt which seals around the eyes and nose like a standard half-mask, the nose may be pinched through the rubber nose pocket to aid equalizing the ears in the same way as with a half mask, and there is an extension to the skirt which seals around the lower part of the face and encloses the mouth. This mask has a clip-on pod section which carries the regulator second stage, and this part seals against the lower part of the frame, allowing the diver to remove the regulator pod when on the surface, or to use an alternative gas supply regulator second stage, which can either be mounted on another pod, or be an ordinary scuba regulator second stage with a standard mouthpiece. This feature makes it possible to use bailout gas supplied by a dive buddy with a standard regulator while wearing a Supermask. The second stage regulator carries a bite-grip mouthpiece so it can be used even without a watertight seal of the pod to the lower part of the mask frame. An optional pod with a dive/surface valve for use with diving rebreathers is available to military users. The KM48 Mod 1 is a heavier duty version of the same concept.

The EXO-26 full-face mask with balanced regulator is suitable for use with scuba or surface supplied air and is rated to 50 m on air. It allows reasonably undistorted speech and can be fitted with wireless diver communications equipment. The supplied regulator is suitable for operations in cold water and under ice, and can be used where the water is mildly contaminated where legislation permits. It was taken off the CE market in 2017.

=== Regulators ===
- Scuba regulators
- Helmet and mask regulators
- Full-face mask regulators

https://www.kirbymorgan.com/products/regulators
