= Prevailing winds =

Strongest direction of wind on a region of Earth's surface

Prevailing winds are strongly influenced by Earth's overall atmospheric circulation, in addition to smaller-scale and shorter-lived weather phenomena

In meteorology, prevailing wind or dominant wind in a region of the Earth's surface is a surface wind that blows predominantly from a particular direction. The dominant winds are the trends in direction of wind with the highest speed over a particular point on the Earth's surface at any given time. A region's prevailing and dominant winds are the result of global patterns of movement in the Earth's atmosphere. In general, winds are predominantly easterly at low latitudes globally. In the mid-latitudes, westerly winds are dominant, and their strength is largely determined by the polar cyclone. In areas where winds tend to be light, the sea breeze-land breeze cycle (powered by differential solar heating and night cooling of sea and land) is the most important cause of the prevailing wind. In areas which have variable terrain, mountain and valley breezes dominate the wind pattern. Highly elevated surfaces can induce a thermal low, which then augments the environmental wind flow. Wind direction at any given time is influenced by synoptic-scale and mesoscale weather like pressure systems and fronts. Local wind direction can also be influenced by microscale features like buildings.

Wind roses are tools used to display the history of wind direction and intensity. Knowledge of the prevailing wind allows the development of prevention strategies for wind erosion of agricultural land, such as across the Great Plains. Sand dunes can orient themselves perpendicular to the prevailing wind direction in coastal and desert locations. Insects drift along with the prevailing wind, but the flight of birds is less dependent on it. Prevailing winds in mountain locations can lead to significant rainfall gradients, ranging from wet across windward-facing slopes to desert-like conditions along their lee slopes.

== Wind rose ==
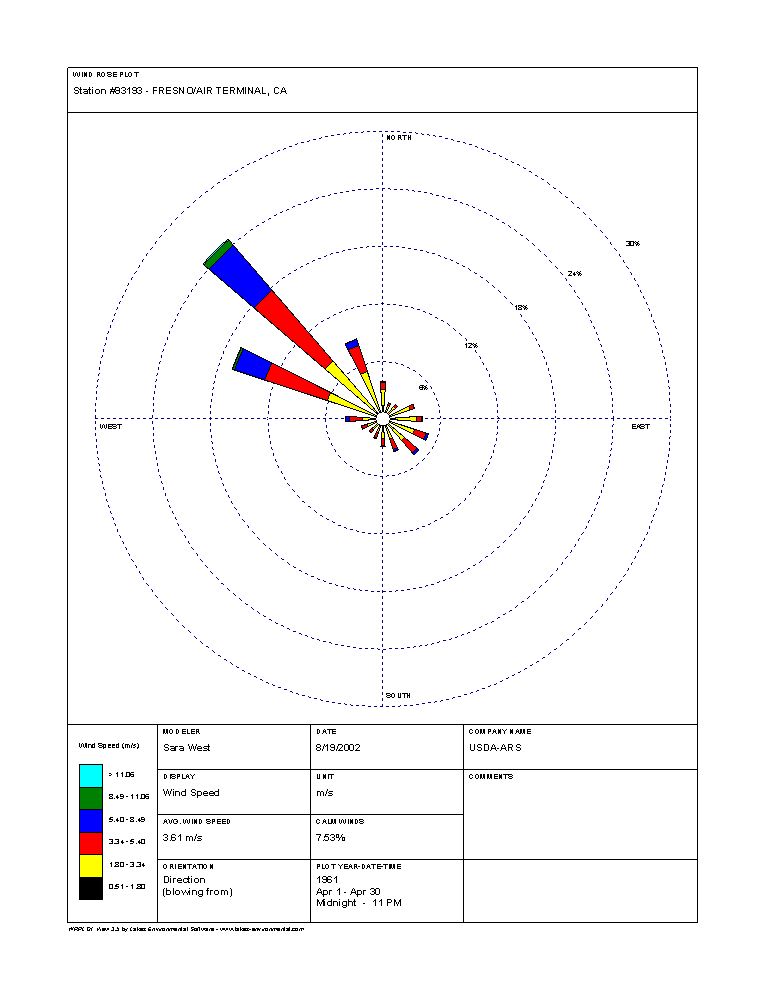
Wind rose plot for Fresno Air Terminal (FAT), Fresno, California for the month of April 1961

A wind rose is a graphic tool used by meteorologists to give a succinct view of how wind speed and direction are typically distributed at a particular location. Presented in a polar coordinate grid, the wind rose shows the frequency of winds blowing from particular directions. The length of each spoke around the circle is related to the proportion of the time that the wind blows from each direction. Each concentric circle represents a different proportion, increasing outwards from zero at the center. A wind rose plot may contain additional information, in that each spoke is broken down into color-coded bands that show wind speed ranges. Wind roses typically show 8 or 16 cardinal directions, such as north (N), NNE, NE, etc., although they may be subdivided into as many as 32 directions.

== Climatology ==
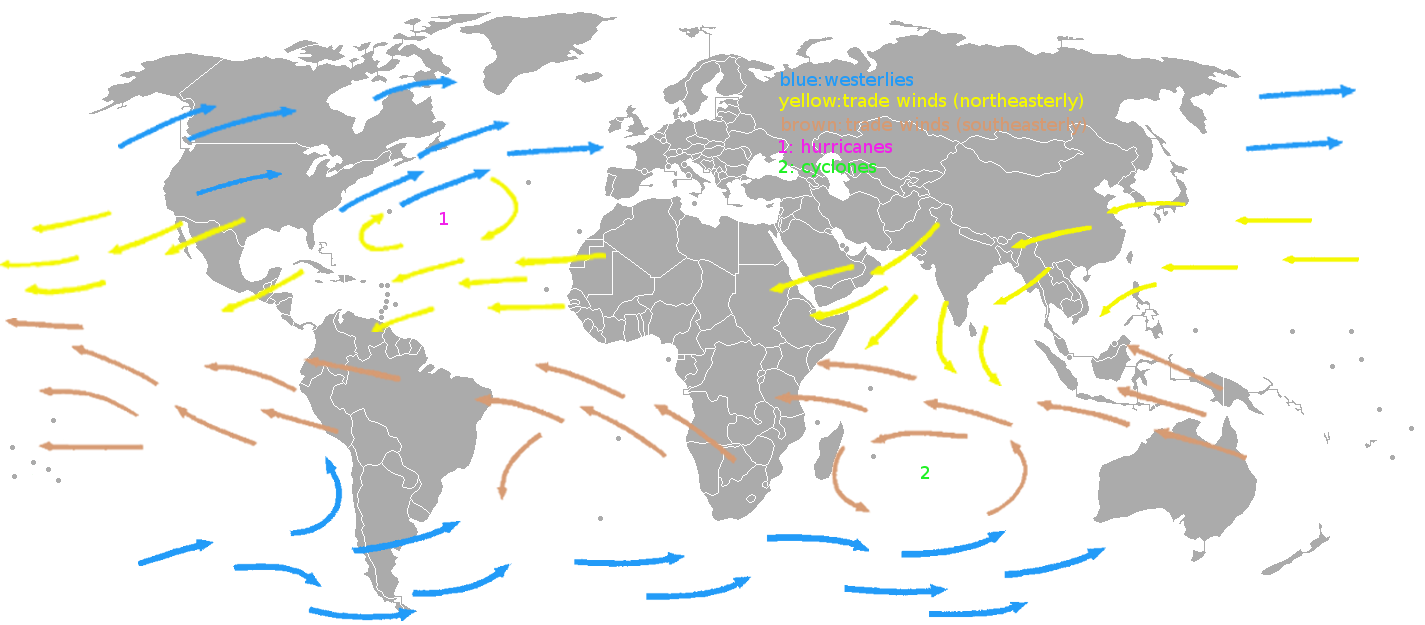
The westerlies (blue) and trade winds (yellow and brown)

=== Trades and their impact ===
The trade winds (also called trades) are the prevailing pattern of easterly surface winds found in the tropics near the Earth's equator, equatorward of the subtropical ridge. These winds blow predominantly from the northeast in the Northern Hemisphere and from the southeast in the Southern Hemisphere. The trade winds act as the steering flow for tropical cyclones that form over world's oceans, guiding their path westward. Trade winds also steer African dust westward across the Atlantic Ocean into the Caribbean Sea, as well as portions of southeast North America.

=== Westerlies and their impact ===
The westerlies or the prevailing westerlies are the prevailing winds in the middle latitudes (i.e. between 35 and 65 degrees latitude), which blow in areas poleward of the high pressure area known as the subtropical ridge in the horse latitudes. These prevailing winds blow from the west to the east, and steer extra-tropical cyclones in this general direction. The winds are predominantly from the southwest in the Northern Hemisphere and from the northwest in the Southern Hemisphere. They are strongest in the winter when the pressure is lower over the poles, such as when the polar cyclone is strongest, and weakest during the summer when the polar cyclone is weakest and when pressures are higher over the poles.

Together with the trade winds, the westerlies enabled a round-trip trade route for sailing ships crossing the Atlantic and Pacific oceans, as the westerlies lead to the development of strong ocean currents in both hemispheres. The westerlies can be particularly strong, especially in the southern hemisphere, where there is less land in the middle latitudes to cause the flow pattern to amplify, which slows the winds down. The strongest westerly winds in the middle latitudes are called the Roaring Forties, between 40 and 50 degrees south latitude, within the Southern Hemisphere. The westerlies play an important role in carrying the warm, equatorial waters and winds to the western coasts of continents, especially in the southern hemisphere because of its vast oceanic expanse.

The westerlies explain why coastal Western North America tends to be wet, especially from Northern Washington to Alaska, during the winter. Differential heating from the Sun between the land which is quite cool and the ocean which is relatively warm causes areas of low pressure to develop over land. This results in moisture-rich air flowing east from the Pacific Ocean, causing frequent rainstorms and wind on the coast. This moisture continues to flow eastward until orographic lift caused by the Coast Ranges, and the Cascade, Sierra Nevada, Columbia, and Rocky Mountains causes a rain shadow effect which limits further penetration of these systems and associated rainfall eastward. This trend reverses in the summer when strong heating of the land causes high pressure and tends to block moisture-rich air from the Pacific from reaching land. This explains why most of coastal Western North America in the highest latitude experiences dry summers, despite vast rainfall in the winter.

=== Polar easterlies ===
The polar easterlies (also known as Polar Hadley cells) are the dry, cold prevailing winds that blow from the high-pressure areas of the polar highs at the North and South Poles towards the low-pressure areas within the westerlies at high latitudes. Like trade winds and unlike the westerlies, these prevailing winds blow from the east to the west, and are often weak and irregular. Due to the low sun angle, cold air builds up and subsides at the pole creating surface high-pressure areas, forcing an outflow of air toward the equator; that outflow is deflected westward by the Coriolis effect.

== Local considerations ==
=== Sea and land breezes ===
A: Sea breeze, B: Land breeze

In areas where the wind flow is light, sea breezes and land breezes are important factors in a location's prevailing winds. The sea is warmed by the sun to a greater depth than the land due to its greater specific heat. The sea therefore has a greater capacity for absorbing heat than the land, so the surface of the sea warms up more slowly than the land's surface. As the temperature of the surface of the land rises, the land heats the air above it. The warm air is less dense and so it rises. This rising air over the land lowers the sea level pressure by about 0.2%. The cooler air above the sea, now with higher sea level pressure, flows towards the land into the lower pressure, creating a cooler breeze near the coast.

The strength of the sea breeze is directly proportional to the temperature difference between the land mass and the sea. If an off-shore wind of 8 knots (15 km/h) exists, the sea breeze is not likely to develop. At night, the land cools off more quickly than the ocean due to differences in their specific heat values, which forces the daytime sea breeze to dissipate. If the temperature onshore cools below the temperature offshore, the pressure over the water will be lower than that of the land, establishing a land breeze, as long as an onshore wind is not strong enough to oppose it.

=== Circulation in elevated regions ===
Mountain wave schematic. The wind flows towards a mountain and produces a first oscillation (A). A second wave occurs further away and higher. The lenticular clouds form at the peak of the waves (B).

Over elevated surfaces, heating of the ground exceeds the heating of the surrounding air at the same altitude above sea level, creating an associated thermal low over the terrain and enhancing any lows which would have otherwise existed, and changing the wind circulation of the region. In areas where there is rugged topography that significantly interrupts the environmental wind flow, the wind can change direction and accelerate parallel to the wind obstruction. This barrier jet can increase the low level wind by 45%. In mountainous areas, local distortion of the airflow is more severe. Jagged terrain combines to produce unpredictable flow patterns and turbulence, such as rotors. Strong updrafts, downdrafts and eddies develop as the air flows over hills and down valleys. Wind direction changes due to the contour of the land. If there is a pass in the mountain range, winds will rush through the pass with considerable speed due to the Bernoulli principle that describes an inverse relationship between speed and pressure. The airflow can remain turbulent and erratic for some distance downwind into the flatter countryside. These conditions are dangerous to ascending and descending airplanes.

Daytime heating and nighttime cooling of the hilly slopes lead to day to night variations in the airflow, similar to the relationship between sea breeze and land breeze. At night, the sides of the hills cool through radiation of the heat. The air along the hills becomes cooler and denser, blowing down into the valley, drawn by gravity. This is known a mountain breeze. If the slopes are covered with ice and snow, the mountain breeze will blow during the day, carrying the cold dense air into the warmer, barren valleys. The slopes of hills not covered by snow will be warmed during the day. The air that comes in contact with the warmed slopes becomes warmer and less dense and flows uphill. This is known as an anabatic wind or valley breeze.

== Effect on precipitation ==
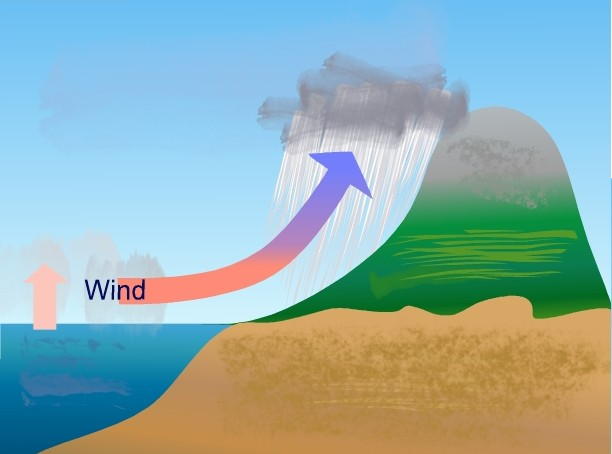
Orographic precipitation

Orographic precipitation occurs on the windward side of mountains. It is caused by the rising air motion of a large-scale flow of moist air across the mountain ridge, resulting in adiabatic cooling and condensation. In mountainous parts of the world subjected to consistent winds (for example, the trade winds), a more moist climate usually prevails on the windward side of a mountain than on the leeward or downwind side. Moisture is removed by orographic lift, leaving drier air (see foehn wind) on the descending and generally warming, leeward side where a rain shadow is observed.

In South America, the Andes mountain range blocks Pacific moisture that arrives in that continent, resulting in a desertlike climate just downwind across western Argentina. The Sierra Nevada range creates the same effect in North America forming the Great Basin and Mojave Deserts.

== Effect on nature ==
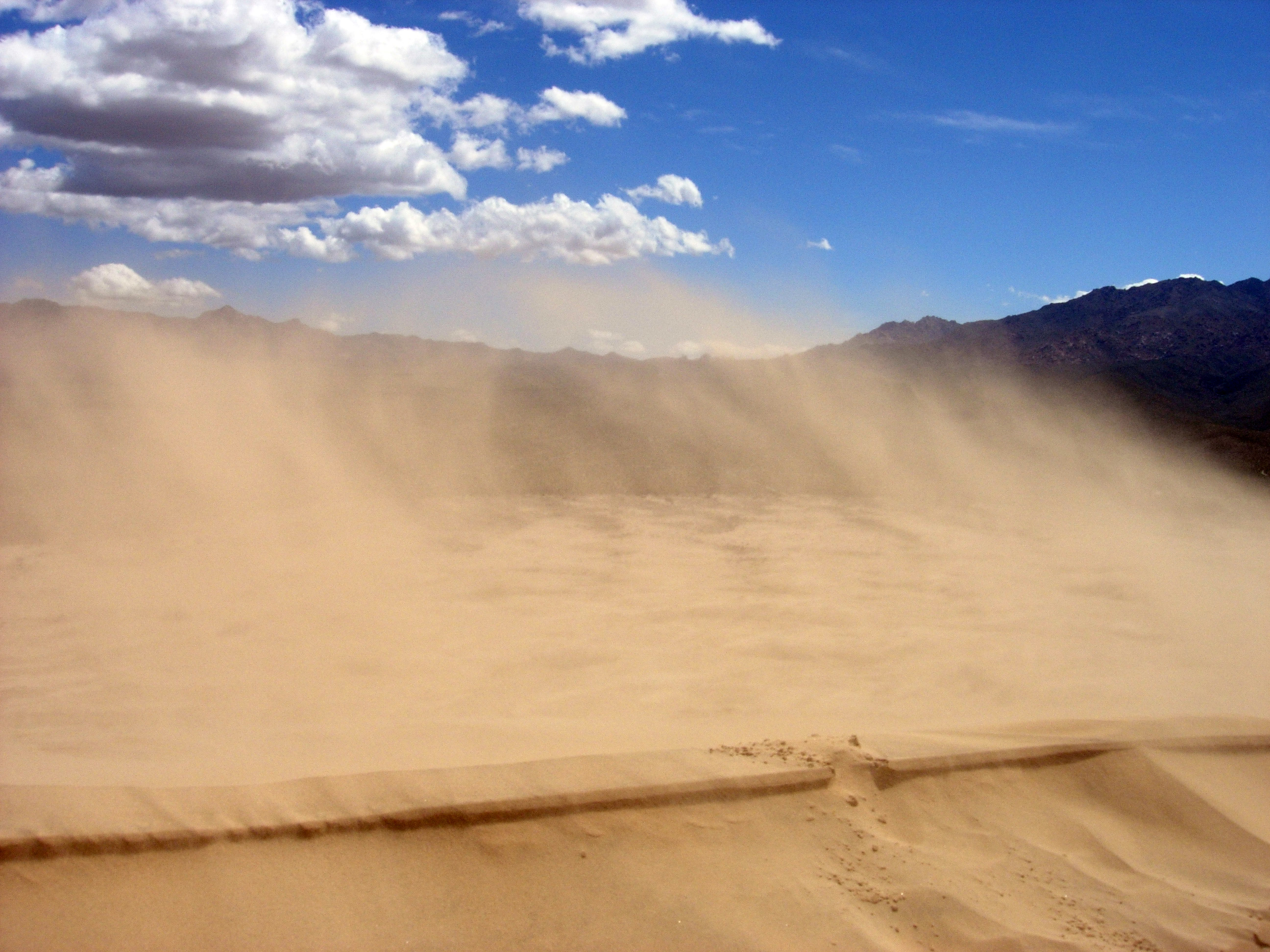
Sand blowing off a crest in the Kelso Dunes of the Mojave Desert, California.

Insects are swept along by the prevailing winds, while birds follow their own course. As such, fine line patterns within weather radar imagery, associated with converging winds, are dominated by insect returns. In the Great Plains, wind erosion of agricultural land is a significant problem, and is mainly driven by the prevailing wind. Because of this, wind barrier strips have been developed to minimize this type of erosion. The strips can be in the form of soil ridges, crop strips, crops rows, or trees which act as wind breaks. They are oriented perpendicular to the wind in order to be most effective. In regions with minimal vegetation, such as coastal and desert areas, transverse sand dunes orient themselves perpendicular to the prevailing wind direction, while longitudinal dunes orient themselves parallel to the prevailing winds.

== See also ==
Global surface wind vector flow lines colored by wind speed from June 1, 2011 to October 31, 2011.

- Trade winds
- Wind speed
- Atmospheric circulation
- Winds in the age of sail
