= Westerlies =

Prevailing winds from the west

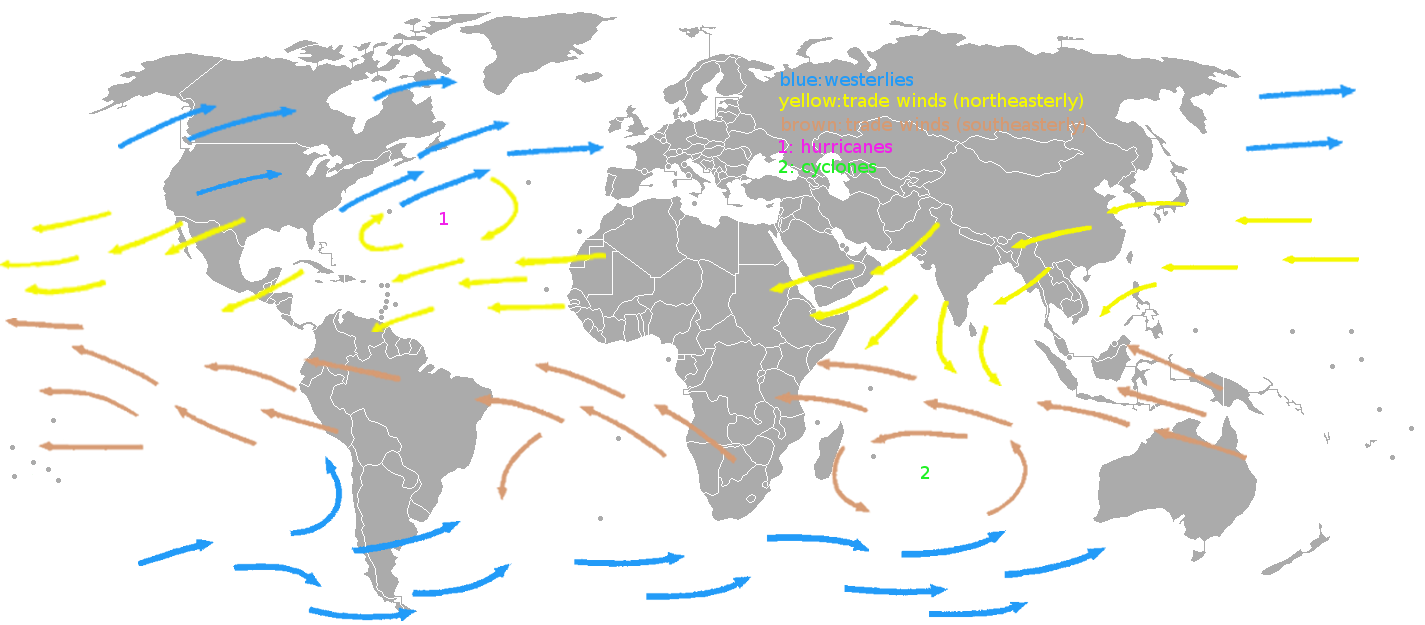
The westerlies (blue) and trade winds (yellow and brown)

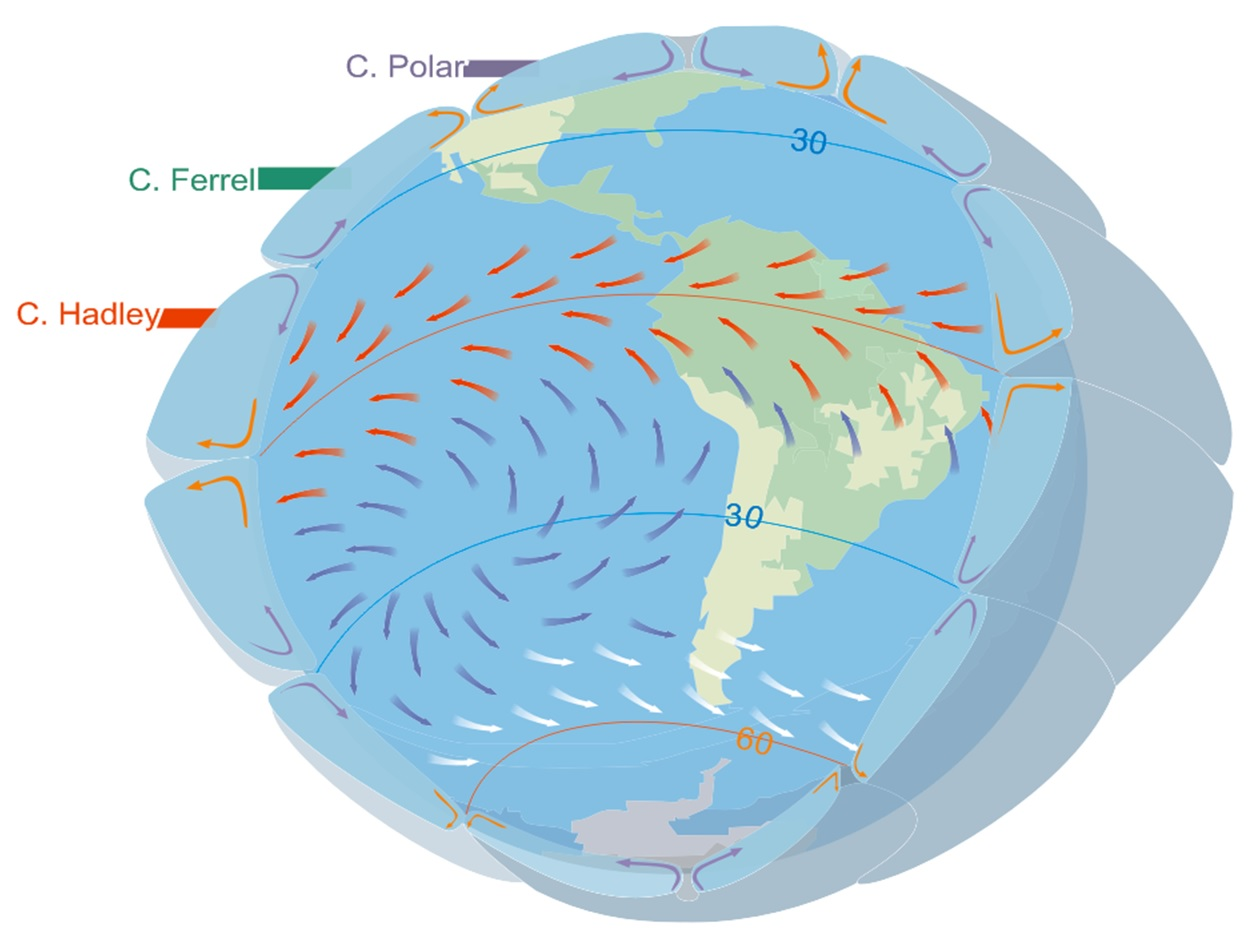
The general atmospheric circulation. Trade winds (red), westerlies (white) and the South Pacific anticyclone (blue)

The westerlies, anti-trades, or prevailing westerlies, are prevailing winds from the west toward the east in the middle latitudes between 30 and 60 degrees latitude. They originate from the high-pressure areas in the horse latitudes (about 30 degrees) and trend towards the poles and steer extratropical cyclones in this general manner. Tropical cyclones which cross the subtropical ridge axis into the westerlies recurve due to the increased westerly flow. The winds are predominantly from the southwest in the Northern Hemisphere and from the northwest in the Southern Hemisphere.

They are created by trade winds in the summer hemisphere and when pressures are higher over the poles. The westerlies are particularly strong, especially in the Southern Hemisphere (called also 'Brave West winds' at striking Chile, Argentina, Tasmania and New Zealand), in areas where land is absent, because land amplifies the flow pattern, making the current more north–south oriented, slowing the westerlies. The strongest westerly winds in the middle latitudes can come in the roaring forties, between 40 and 50 degrees south latitude. The westerlies play an important role in carrying the warm, equatorial waters and winds to the western coasts of continents, especially in the southern hemisphere because of its vast oceanic expanse.

== Behaviour ==
If the Earth were tidally locked to the Sun, solar heating would cause winds across the mid-latitudes to blow in a poleward direction, away from the subtropical ridge. However, the Coriolis effect caused by the rotation of Earth tends to deflect poleward winds eastward from north (to the right) in the Northern Hemisphere and eastward from south (to the left) in the Southern Hemisphere. This is why winds across the Northern Hemisphere tend to blow from the southwest, but they tend to be from the northwest in the Southern Hemisphere. When pressures are lower over the poles, the strength of the westerlies increases, which has the effect of warming the mid-latitudes. This occurs when the Arctic oscillation is positive, and during winter low pressure near the poles is stronger than it would be during the summer. When it is negative and pressures are higher over the poles, the flow is more meridional, blowing from the direction of the pole towards the Equator, which brings cold air into the mid-latitudes.

Throughout the year, the westerlies vary in strength with the polar cyclone. As the cyclone reaches its maximum intensity in winter, the westerlies increase in strength. As the cyclone reaches its weakest intensity in summer, the Westerlies weaken. An example of the impact of the westerlies is when dust plumes, originating in the Gobi Desert combine with pollutants and spread large distances downwind, or eastward, into North America. The westerlies can be particularly strong, especially in the Southern Hemisphere, where there is less land in the middle to cause the progression of west to east winds to slow down. In the Southern hemisphere, because of the stormy and cloudy conditions, it is usual to refer to the westerlies as the roaring forties, furious fifties, or shrieking sixties according to the varying degrees of latitude.

== Impact on ocean currents ==
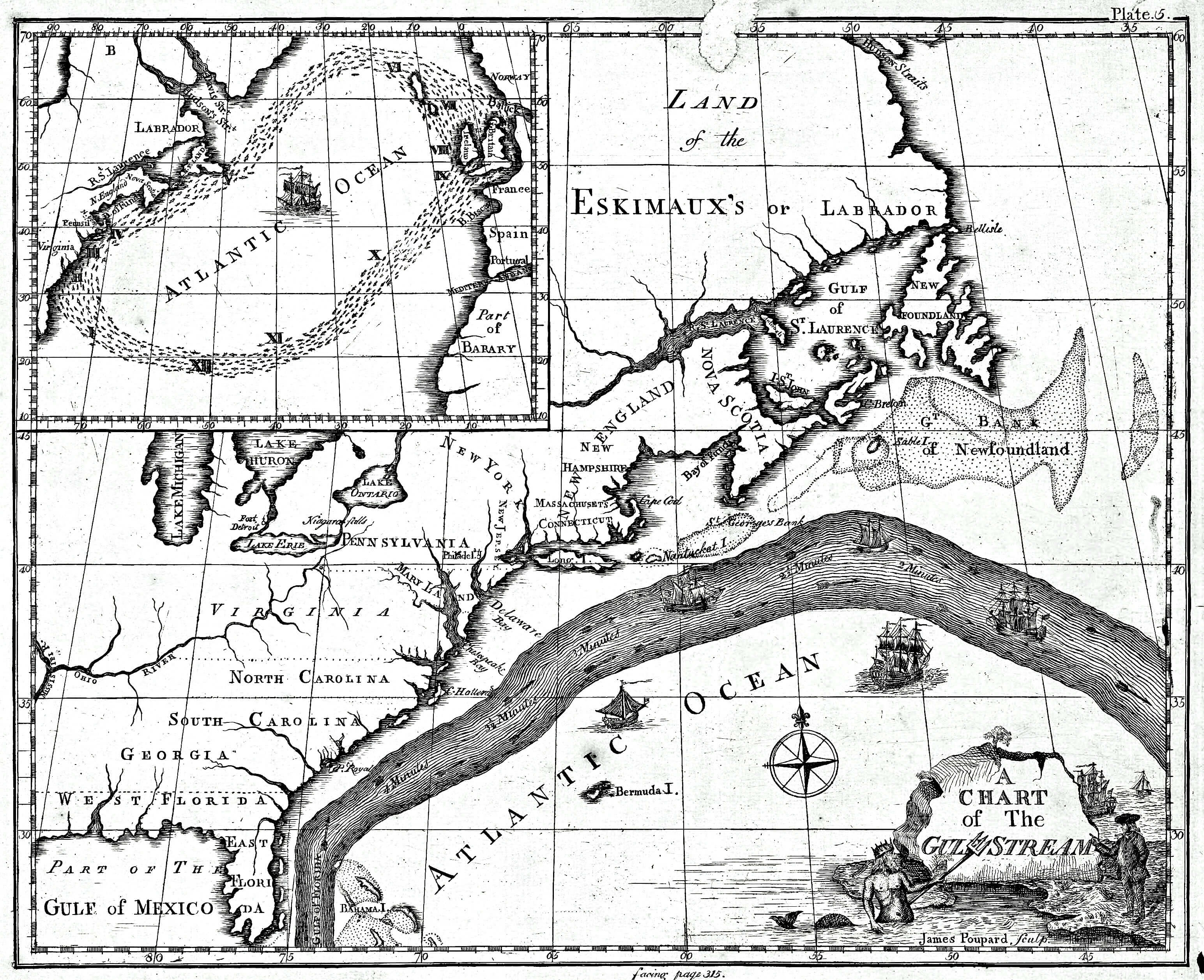
Benjamin Franklin's map of the Gulf Stream

Due to persistent winds from west to east on the poleward sides of the subtropical ridges located in the Atlantic and Pacific oceans, ocean currents are driven in a similar manner in both hemispheres. The currents in the Northern Hemisphere are weaker than those in the Southern Hemisphere due to the differences in strength between the westerlies of each hemisphere. The process of western intensification causes currents on the western boundary of an ocean basin to be stronger than those on the eastern boundary of an ocean. These western ocean currents transport warm, tropical water polewards toward the polar regions. Ships crossing both oceans have taken advantage of the ocean currents for centuries.

The Antarctic Circumpolar Current (ACC), or the West Wind Drift, is an ocean current that flows from west to east around Antarctica. The ACC is the dominant circulation feature of the Southern Ocean and, at approximately 125 Sverdrups, the largest ocean current. In the northern hemisphere, the Gulf Stream, part of the North Atlantic Subtropical Gyre, has led to the development of strong cyclones of all types at the base of the Westerlies, both within the atmosphere and within the ocean. The Kuroshio (Japanese for "Black Tide") is a strong western boundary current in the western north Pacific Ocean, similar to the Gulf Stream, which has also contributed to the depth of ocean storms in that region.

== Extratropical cyclones ==
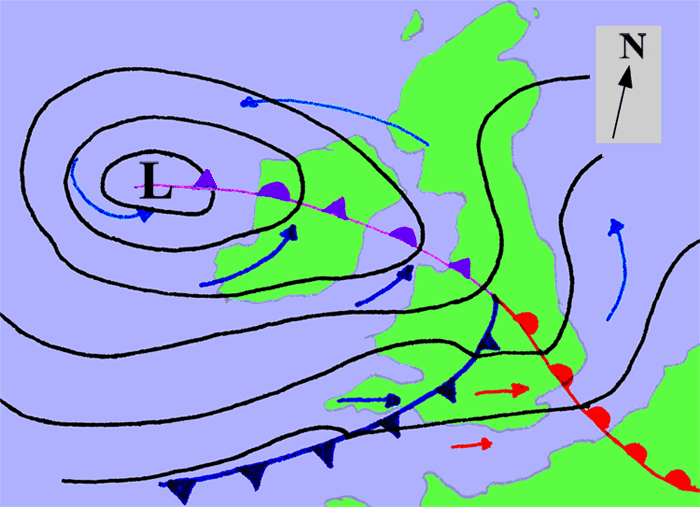
A fictitious synoptic chart of an extratropical cyclone affecting the UK and Ireland. The blue arrows between isobars indicate the direction of the wind, while the "L" symbol denotes the centre of the "low". Note the occluded, cold and warm frontal boundaries.

An extratropical cyclone is a synoptic scale low-pressure weather system that has neither tropical nor polar characteristics, being connected with fronts and horizontal gradients in temperature and dew point otherwise known as "baroclinic zones".

The descriptor "extratropical" refers to the fact that this type of cyclone generally occurs outside of the tropics, in the middle latitudes of the planet, where the Westerlies steer the system generally from west to east. These systems may also be described as "mid-latitude cyclones" due to their area of formation, or "post-tropical cyclones" where extratropical transition has occurred, and are often described as "depressions" or "lows" by weather forecasters and the general public. These are the everyday phenomena which along with anticyclones, drive the weather over much of the Earth.

Although extratropical cyclones are almost always classified as baroclinic since they form along zones of temperature and dewpoint gradient, they can sometimes become barotropic late in their life cycle when the temperature distribution around the cyclone becomes fairly uniform along the radius from the center of low pressure. An extratropical cyclone can transform into a subtropical storm, and from there into a tropical cyclone, if it dwells over warm waters and develops central convection, which warms its core and causes temperature and dewpoint gradients near their centers to fade.

== Interaction with tropical cyclones ==
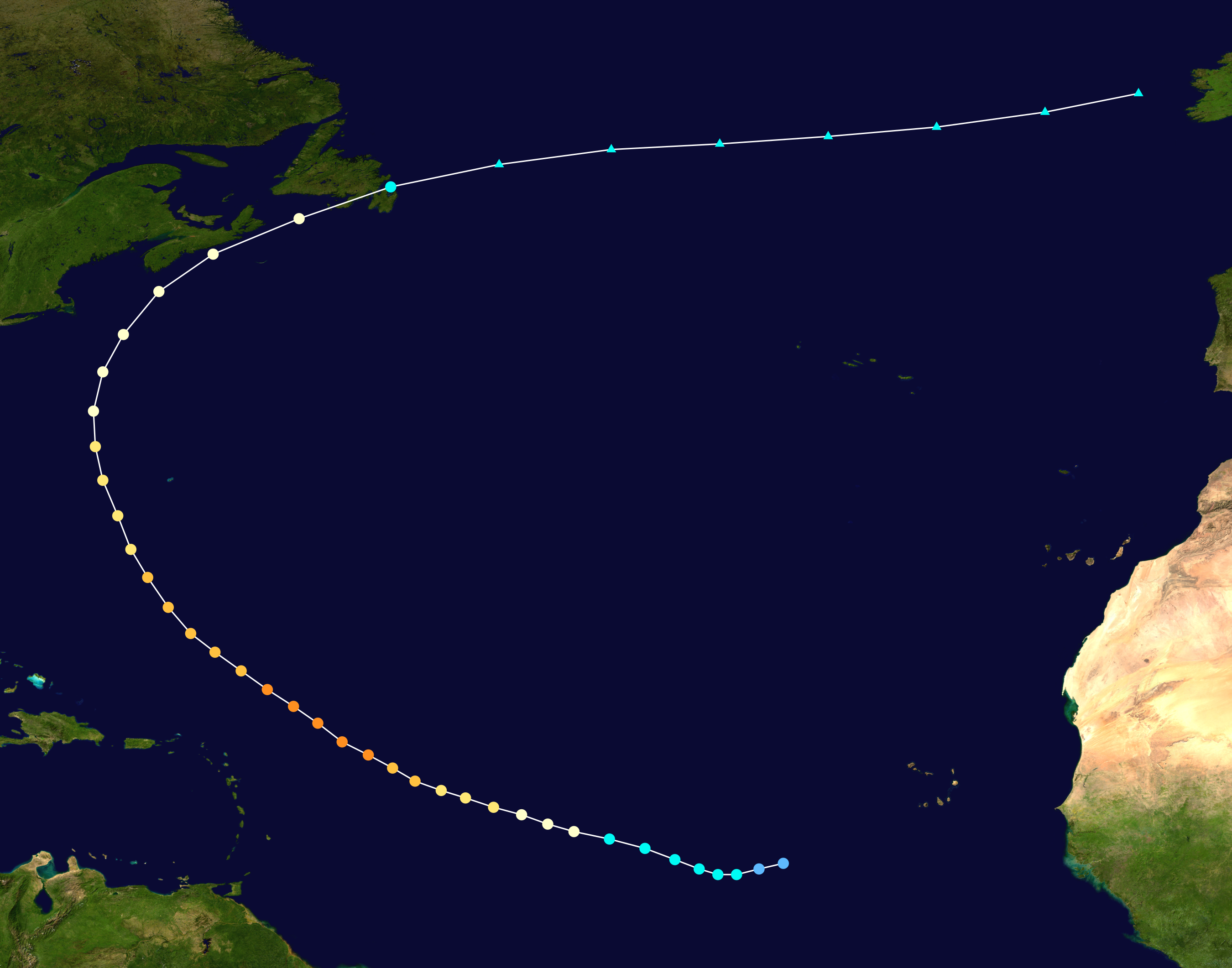
Storm track of Hurricane Bill (2009), showing a classic recurvature off the American coast in 2009

When a tropical cyclone crosses the subtropical ridge axis, normally through a break in the high-pressure area caused by a system traversing the Westerlies, its general track around the high-pressure area is deflected significantly by winds moving towards the general low-pressure area to its north. When the cyclone track becomes strongly poleward with an easterly component, the cyclone has begun recurvature, entering the Westerlies. A typhoon moving through the Pacific Ocean towards Asia, for example, will recurve offshore of Japan to the north, and then to the northeast, if the typhoon encounters southwesterly winds (blowing northeastward) around a low-pressure system passing over China or Siberia. Many tropical cyclones are eventually forced toward the northeast by extratropical cyclones in this manner, which move from west to east to the north of the subtropical ridge. An example of a tropical cyclone in recurvature was Typhoon Ioke in 2006, which took a similar trajectory.

== See also ==
- 2023 Chinese balloon incident
- Easterlies
- Ferrel cell
- Hadley cell
- Ocean current
- Polar easterlies
- West wind
