= Storm track =

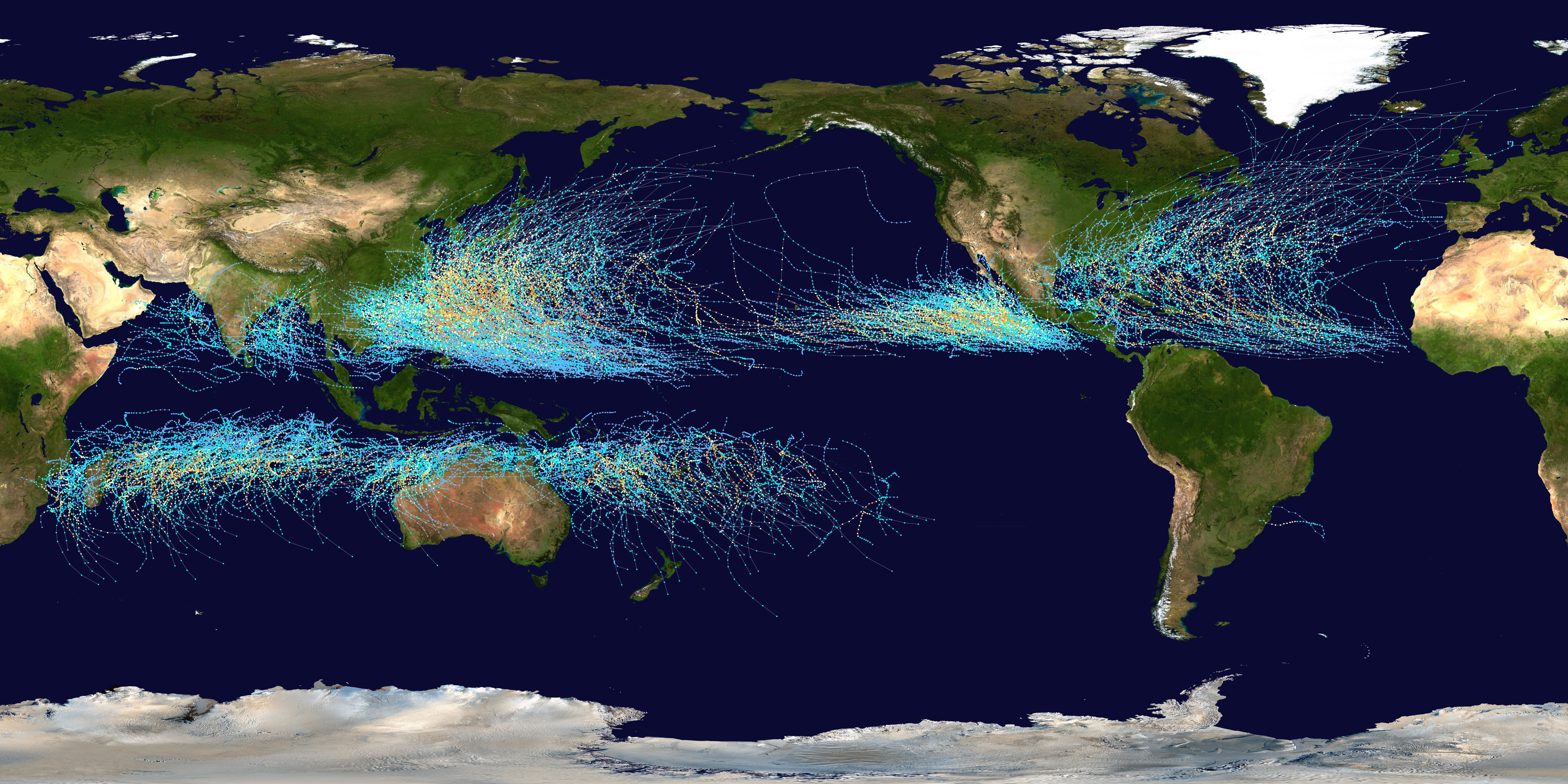
Global tropical cyclone tracks between 1985 and 2005, indicating the areas where tropical cyclones usually develop

Storm tracks are the relatively narrow zones in seas and oceans where storms travel driven by the prevailing winds.

The Atlantic and Pacific have storm tracks along which most Atlantic or Pacific extratropical cyclones or tropical cyclones travel. The storm tracks usually begin in the westernmost parts of Atlantic and Pacific, where the large temperature contrasts between land and sea cause cyclones to form, particularly in winter. Surface friction cause these cyclones to quickly fill up and decay as soon as they reach land at the eastern end of the basins, accounting for the easternmost edges of the storm tracks.

Storm tracks can shift position, causing important climatic patterns. As an example, during La Niña the Atlantic storm track shifts north causing droughts in Palestine, while during El Niño it shifts south bringing heavy rains to the same region.

Another example of a storm track is the circumpolar storm track in the Antarctic, however land-sea contrasts play no role in its formation.

Given a grid point field of geopotential height, storm tracks can be visualized by contouring its average standard deviation, after the data has been band-pass filtered.

== See also ==
- Storm train
- Tropical cyclogenesis
- Extratropical cyclone
