= Antarctic high =

In meteorology, the Antarctic High is the stronger of the two polar highs, areas of high atmospheric pressure situated in the poles. It is situated over Eastern Antarctica, hence it sometimes being referred to as the East Antarctic High.

== Effects ==
Since the Last Glacial Period, temperature trends have suggested that the interplay from the Antarctic High and Southern Annular Mode has played a significant role in katabatic winds over the Patriot Hills Base Camp. A 2022 study by Nature noted that when the high is over the Drake Passage, it alongside an elongated cyclone located in the South Pacific transport warm and moist air to the southwestern Antarctic Peninsula, which is linked to record-high temperatures, extreme summertime melt, and dramatic break-ups in the Larsen Ice Shelf and eastern Antarctic Peninsula since the 1990s.
