= Polar easterlies =

Dry, cold prevailing winds within Earth's polar regions

In the study of Earth's atmosphere, polar easterlies are the dry, cold prevailing winds that blow around the high-pressure areas of the polar highs at the North and South poles. Cold air subsides at the poles creating high pressure zones, forcing an equatorward outflow of air; that outflow is then deflected westward by the Coriolis effect. Unlike the westerlies in the middle latitudes and trade winds in tropics, the polar easterlies are often weak and irregular. Note, winds are named based on where they came from. The polar easterlies are one of the five primary wind zones, known as wind belts, that make up our atmosphere's circulatory system. This particular belt of wind begins at approximately 60 degrees north and south latitude and reaches to the poles.

== See also ==
- Westerlies
