= Polar high =

Regions of high atmospheric pressure around the Earth's poles

In meteorology, the polar highs are areas of high atmospheric pressure, sometimes similar to anticyclones, around the North and South Poles; the south polar high (Antarctic high) being the stronger one because land gains and loses heat more effectively than sea, which the north has much less of. The cold temperatures in the polar regions cause air to descend, creating the high pressure (a process called subsidence), just as the warm temperatures around the equator cause air to rise instead and create the low pressure Intertropical Convergence Zone. Rising air also occurs along bands of low pressure situated just below the polar highs around the 50th parallel of latitude. These extratropical convergence zones are occupied by the polar fronts where air masses of polar origin meet and clash with those of tropical or subtropical origin in a stationary front. This convergence of rising air completes the vertical cycle around the polar cell in each latitudinal hemisphere's polar region. Closely related to this concept is the polar vortex, a rotating low-pressure circle of cold air around the poles.

Surface temperatures under the polar highs are one of the coldest on Earth, with no month having an average temperature above freezing. Regions under the polar high also experience very low levels of precipitation, which leads them to be known as "polar deserts".

Air flows outwards from the poles to create the polar easterlies in the Arctic and Antarctic areas.

== See also ==
- Polar vortex
- Polar low
