= CONTRASTS Expedition =

2025 Arctic expedition

CONTRASTS expedition
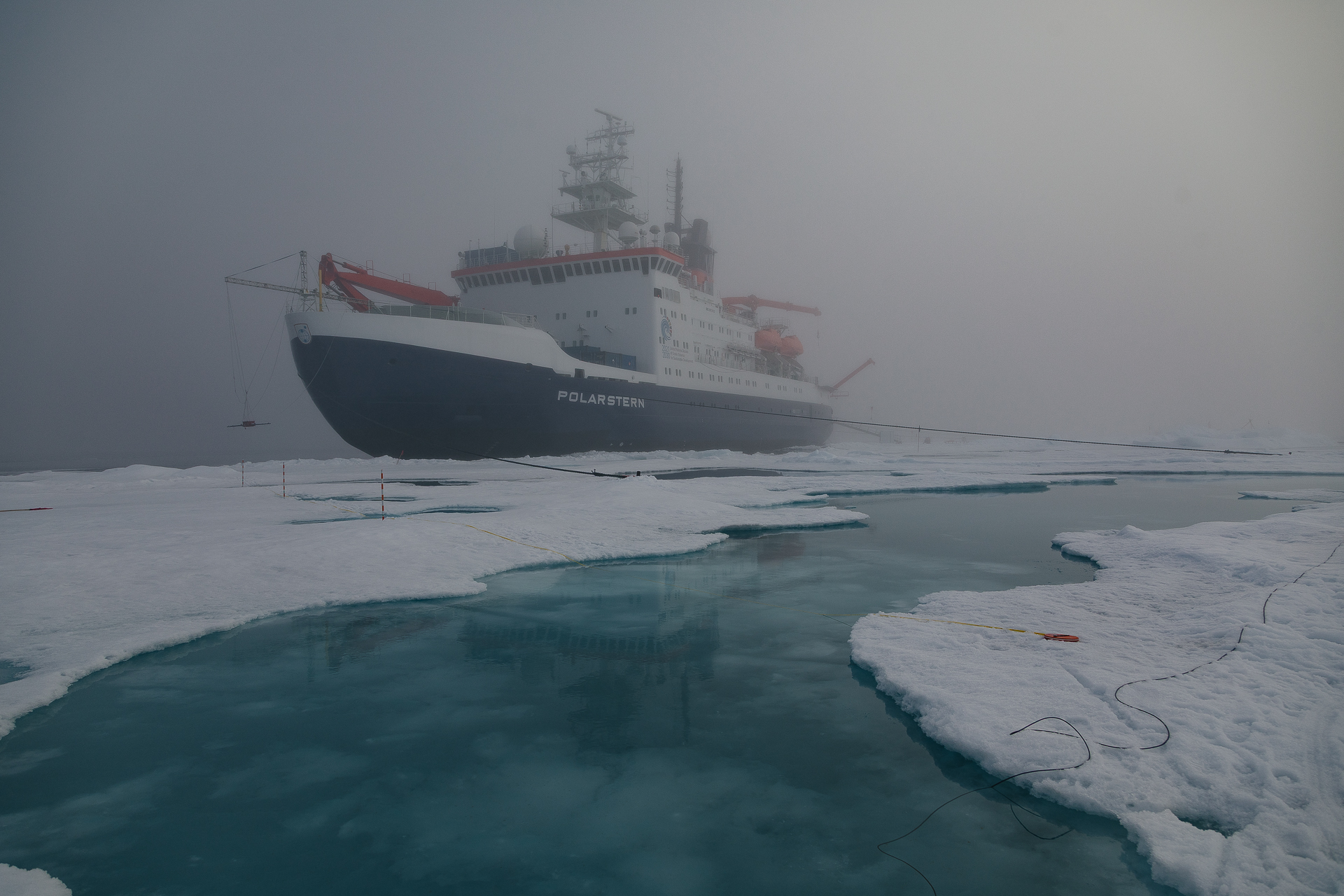
- Polarstern during the CONTRASTS expedition (August 2025)
- Country: Germany
- Leader: Marcel Nicolaus
- Start: Tromsø, Norway; 2 July 2025
- End: Longyearbyen, Svalbard; 1 September 2025
- Goal: Investigation of sea ice melt and variability across three Arctic sea ice regimes
- Ships: RV Polarstern

The CONTRASTS expedition was a two-month scientific expedition in the Arctic Ocean (July 2025 – September 2025) to investigate sea ice melt across three regimes: seasonal, first- and second‑year, and multiyear ice. The expedition was designed to compare these regimes under similar seasonal conditions by applying an identical measurement programme at each site and repeating observations over several weeks.

It investigated sea-ice melt across three regimes of differing age and origin in the Central Arctic Ocean, aiming to fill observational gaps from MOSAiC expedition and enhance understanding of late-summer and autumn transitions. Unlike the MOSAiC expedition, which focused on a single drifting ice floe, CONTRASTS explicitly sampled multiple sea ice regimes to capture spatial variability in the Arctic sea ice system. During the journey, the research icebreaker Polarstern moved between multiple ice floes representing three sea ice regimes. The expedition investigated the causes of sea ice melt in three contrasting sea ice regimes in response to atmospheric and oceanographic conditions. These three regimes were: (1) first-year ice drifting along the marginal ice zone, (2) second- and multiyear ice formed in the Russian Arctic, and (3) multiyear ice from the north of Greenland and Canada. Regime 1 is expected to dominate the Arctic in the future, regime 2 previously dominated but is now often melting before reaching the Fram Strait, and regime 3 was formerly more widespread. The regimes represent “future Arctic”, “present Arctic”, and “past Arctic”. Work at each floe was organized around ice stations, with revisits planned for approximately three and six weeks later. This was complemented by autonomous stations deployed at the start of the expedition, which provided continuous measurements throughout the duration of the expedition. The selected time in July and August was aimed to fill the observational gaps left by the MOSAiC expedition regarding late-summer and autumn transitions. The ice floes were scheduled to be surveyed by a research aircraft Polar 6 from Station Nord during the ICEBird summer 2025 campaign.

The international expedition, comprising 51 scientists from 14 nations and institutes from 8 countries, was led by polar researcher and sea ice physicist Marcel Nicolaus, with Thomas Krumpen also serving as co-cruise leader, both from the Alfred Wegener Institute for Polar and Marine Research. The campaign was also named PS149 (Polarstern cruise 149) and ArcWatch-3 to align with previous Arctic monitoring campaigns.

== Scientific concept ==
The expedition was designed to investigate the variability of Arctic sea ice by comparing three distinct sea ice regimes under similar seasonal conditions. A sea ice regime is defined as a combination of formation region, age, thickness, and atmospheric and oceanic boundary conditions. This approach enabled direct comparison of processes controlling sea ice melt under different environmental conditions.

At each ice station, an identical measurement programme was carried out, enabling direct comparison between regimes. The stations were revisited over a period of approximately six weeks, allowing both spatial and temporal variability during the summer melt season to be observed.

== Expedition ==
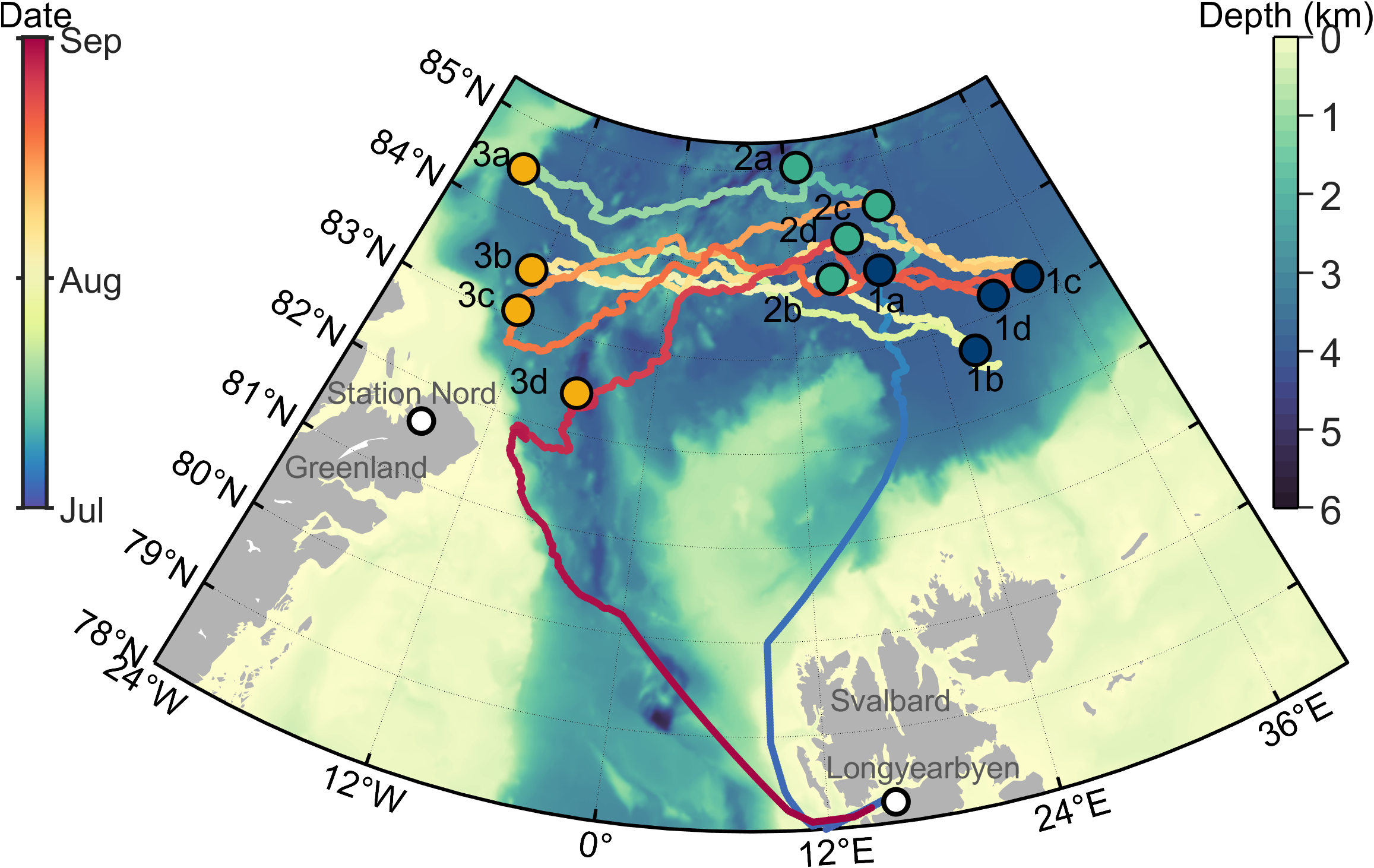
Map of locations of RV Polarstern and ice stations during expedition

The expedition established a multidisciplinary platform for studying biological and physical processes. In total, 12 ice stations were occupied during the expedition, with each of the three regimes visited four times. The scientists were divided into four teams. The sea ice physics team focuses its work on characterizing the properties and surface structures of different sea ice regimes, including ice and melt pond thicknesses and energy balances. The ocean physics team performs mesoscale and local measurements of turbulence in the water column, with attention to processes close to floe margins and leads. The atmospheric team covers exchange processes between the atmosphere and ice. The ecology and biogeochemistry team focuses on biodiversity and ecosystems, and how physical and chemical changes influence them during the melting season.

The expedition began on 2 July 2025 in Tromsø, Norway. The RV Polarstern transported the French research platform Tara Polar Station to the sea ice. On 6 July, the expedition encountered the first sea ice at 82° 11′ N, 20° 00′ E. Three days later, on 9 July, Polarstern reached the first ice station in ice regime 1, consisting of first-year ice. On 19 July, the expedition established the third ice station in ice regime 3, characterized by old and deformed ice. On 22 July, the ice floe was surveyed by the research aircraft Polar 6. On 25 July, the first ice floe was revisited. Between 30 July and 1 August, the second floe was revisited. Both ice floes had undergone significant changes, with significant basal and lateral ice melt. On 5 August, floe 1 disintegrated and was accessible only for instrument recovery. For the third visit to regime 1, the scientists located a new ice floe. By the end of the expedition, floes in regimes 2 and 3 had each been revisited four times. The expedition concluded in Longyearbyen, Svalbard, on 1 September 2025.

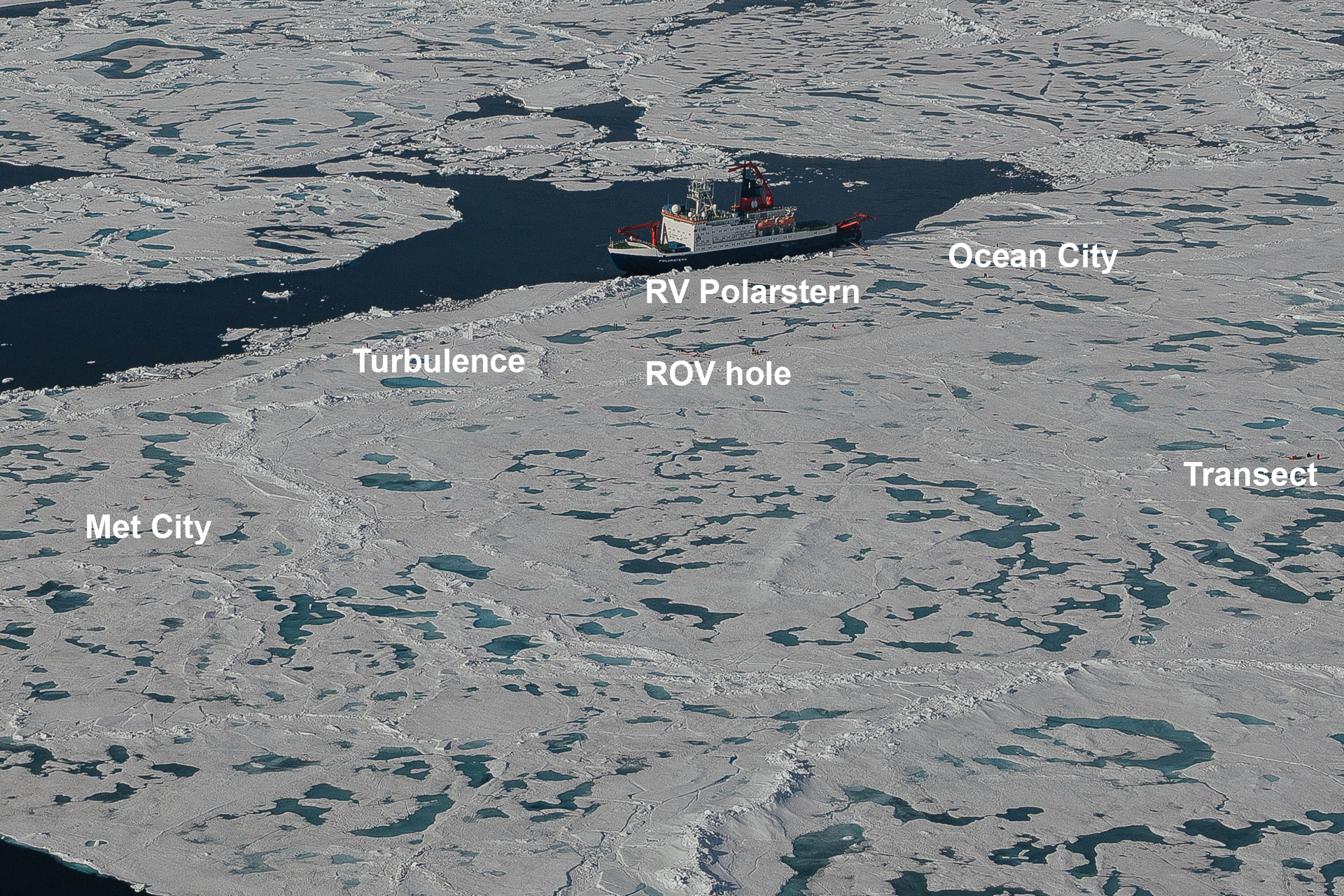
The main sites of ice floe 3

Overview of ice stations
Floe Visit	Floe 1	Floe 2	Floe 3
Visit 1	09.07–12.07	14.07–17.07	19.07–22.07
Visit 2	25.07–28.07	30.07–01.08	04.08–06.08
Visit 3	09.08–10.08 (new floe)	12.08–14.08	16.08–18.08
Visit 4	21.08–21.08 (recovery)	23.08–24.08	26.08–27.08

== Instruments ==
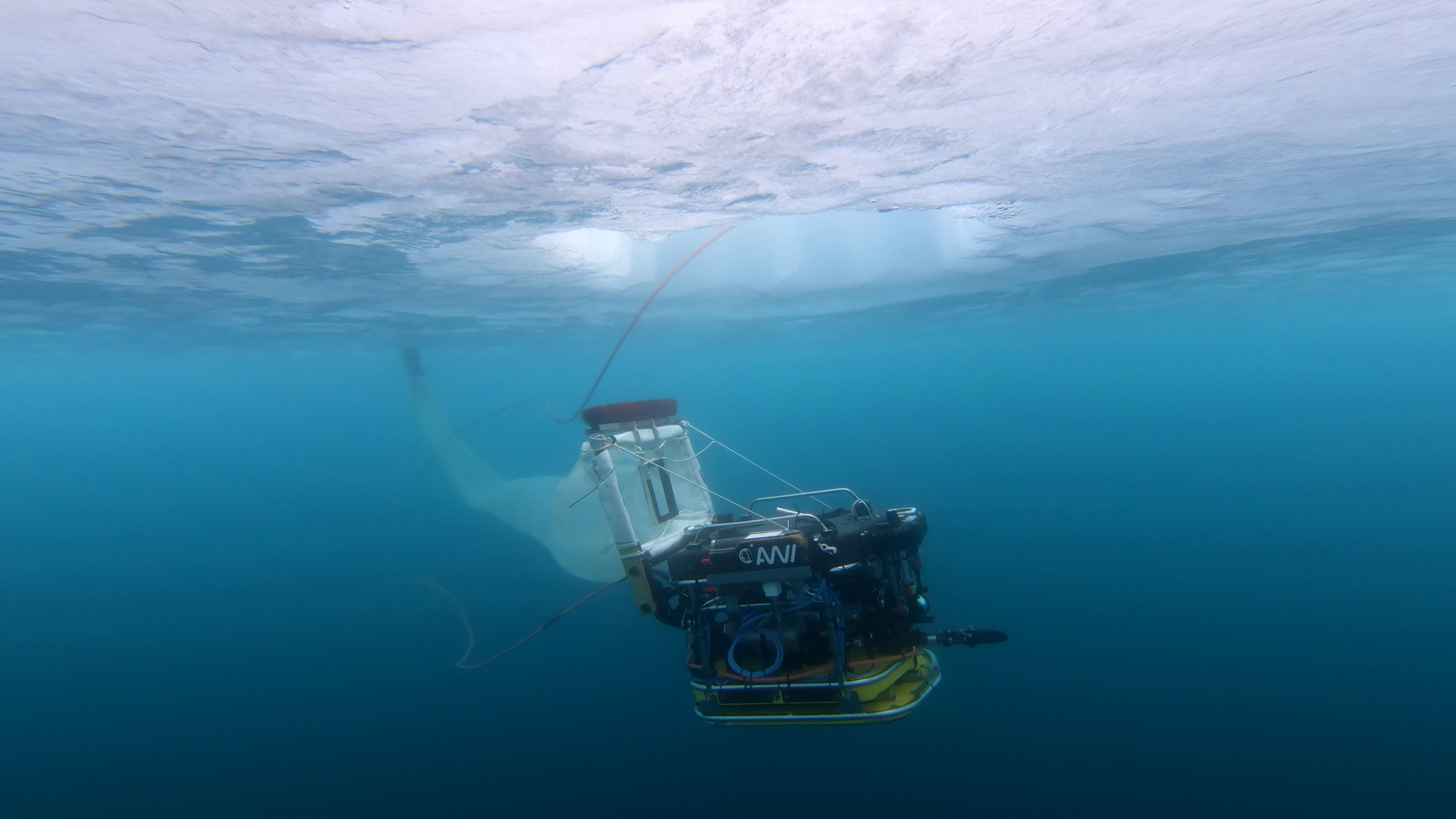
Remotely Operated Vehicle with plankton nets

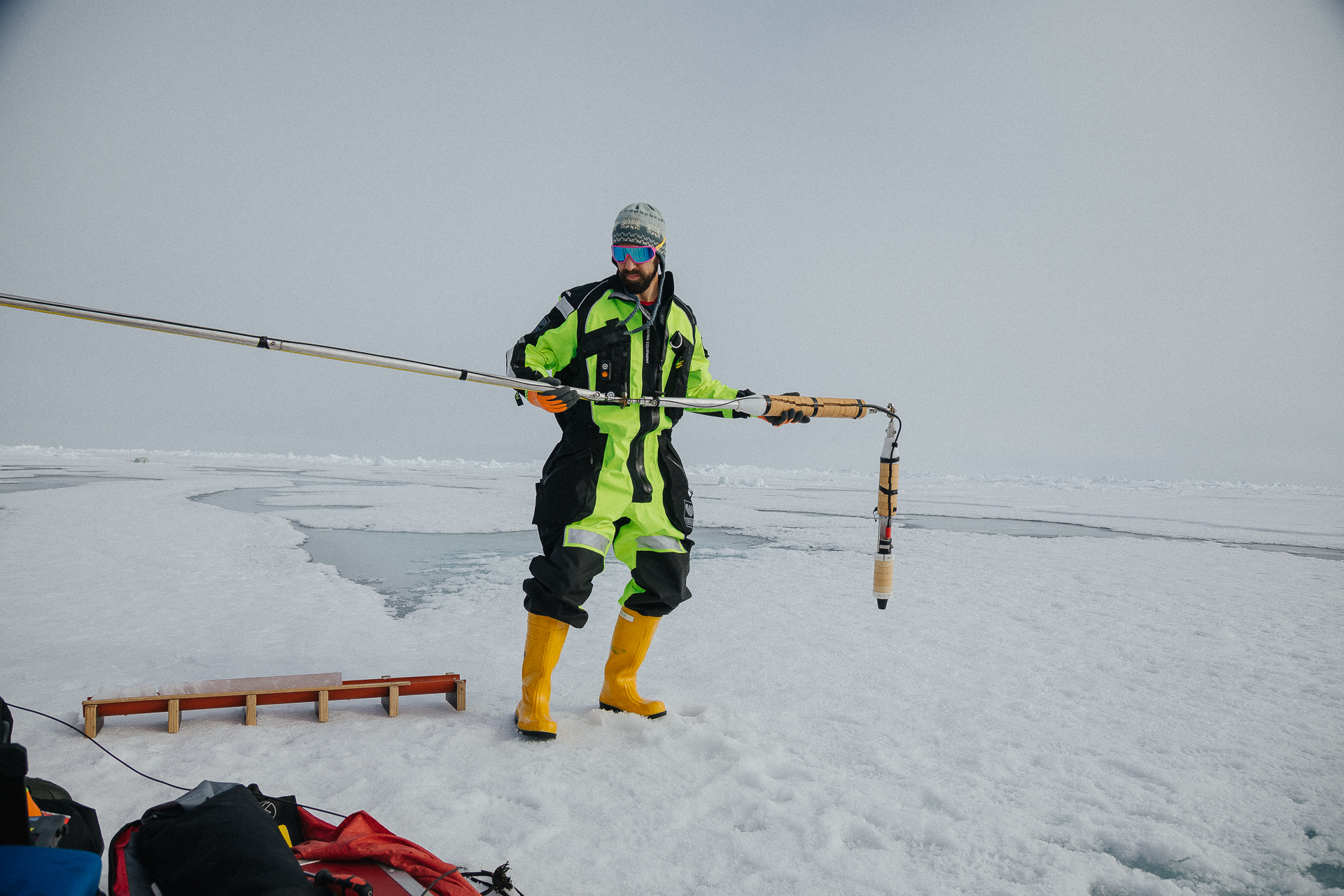
Researcher measuring spectral light transmittance of sea ice using a portable L-ARM device

A key feature of the expedition was the extensive use of autonomous measurement systems, which continued collecting data between station visits. Measurements combined in situ observations on the sea ice, ship-based measurements, airborne surveys, and autonomous platforms. These instruments were used to quantify key processes controlling sea-ice melt, including radiative energy balance, ocean heat flux, turbulence, and biological productivity. The main instruments used during the expedition included:

- A 10 m (33 ft)-high mast for monitoring atmospheric temperature and humidity
- A tower for measuring incoming and reflected broadband radiation and wind
- Drones and helicopters equipped with optical cameras, laser scanners, and radiometers
- Spectral and broadband albedo measurements using spectroradiometers and albedometers
- Electromagnetic sounding devices for ice thickness measurements
- Autonomous instruments, including ice mass balance buoys, snow buoys, and radiation stations
- Hyperspectral imaging systems for melt ponds and sea ice
- Ice coring and thickness drilling sampling for ice thickness and key biophysical properties
- A remotely operated vehicle for under-ice radiation and sonar-based topography measurements
- Plankton nets for biological sampling
- Oceanographic buoys, including CTD and ADCP profilers, expendable CTD, and microstructure sensors

Instruments and measurements were mostly performed within several key sites located in a close vicinity of the ship, within several hundred meters from each other. These key sites formed a coordinated measurement network, often referred to as “cities”, including meteorological (met) city, oceanography (ocean) city, ROV hole, coring, turbulence, buoy, and transect sites.

In total, the expedition lasted 61 days, with 661 hours spent at 12 ice stations. Polarstern covered 8,730 km (5,420 mi) during the trip from Tromsø to Longyearbyen.

Helicopter-borne surveys covered around 10,000 km (6,200 mi) and 70 hours of flight. 37 autonomous stations and 170 weather balloons were deployed or launched. Ice and snow thickness transects covered 31 km (19 mi). Ocean sampling included 18 deep CTDs and 174 ocean microstructure profiles.

== Preliminary results ==
The biological sampling during the expedition revealed that ice algae were almost completely absent in the waters between Greenland and Svalbard. This absence was also observed in and under the ice floes during field measurements. The biological communities were dominated by bacteria and zooplankton at all three ice floes. Air temperatures of up to +13 °C at an altitude of 300 m were recorded during the expedition, which is unusually high for the central Arctic.

Early results showed that the melt progression differed significantly among the three regimes. Regime 1—seasonal ice in the marginal ice zone—was thin and porous, with large melt ponds and extensive surface melt. Regime 2, composed mostly of older ice with sediment inclusions, began with less surface melt but gradually acquired features similar to those of Regime 1. Regime 3, though initially largely intact, showed accelerating melt over time, both at the surface and from below. Surface melting was observed prior to bottom melting. The thickness of undeformed ice was only 1.5 m, even for older ice. Sea ice was not strongly deformed, with a pressure ridge density of only 5 to 6 ridges per kilometer. The investigated area experienced an all-time low ice concentration of around 60% due to strongly divergent ice drift. During the expedition, the ice edge retreated significantly northward and overall sea ice concentration decreased in the study region. Ocean heat storage and circulation influenced both sea ice melt and atmospheric conditions, demonstrating strong coupling between the ocean and atmosphere in the Arctic system. The observations provide insight into the ongoing transition toward a thinner and more seasonal Arctic sea ice cover.

== See also ==
- Arctic exploration
- MOSAiC Expedition
- Surface Heat Budget of the Arctic Ocean (SHEBA) expedition
- N-ICE2015 expedition
- Nansen's Fram expedition
- Polar exploration
