= N-ICE2015 expedition =

2015 Arctic research expedition

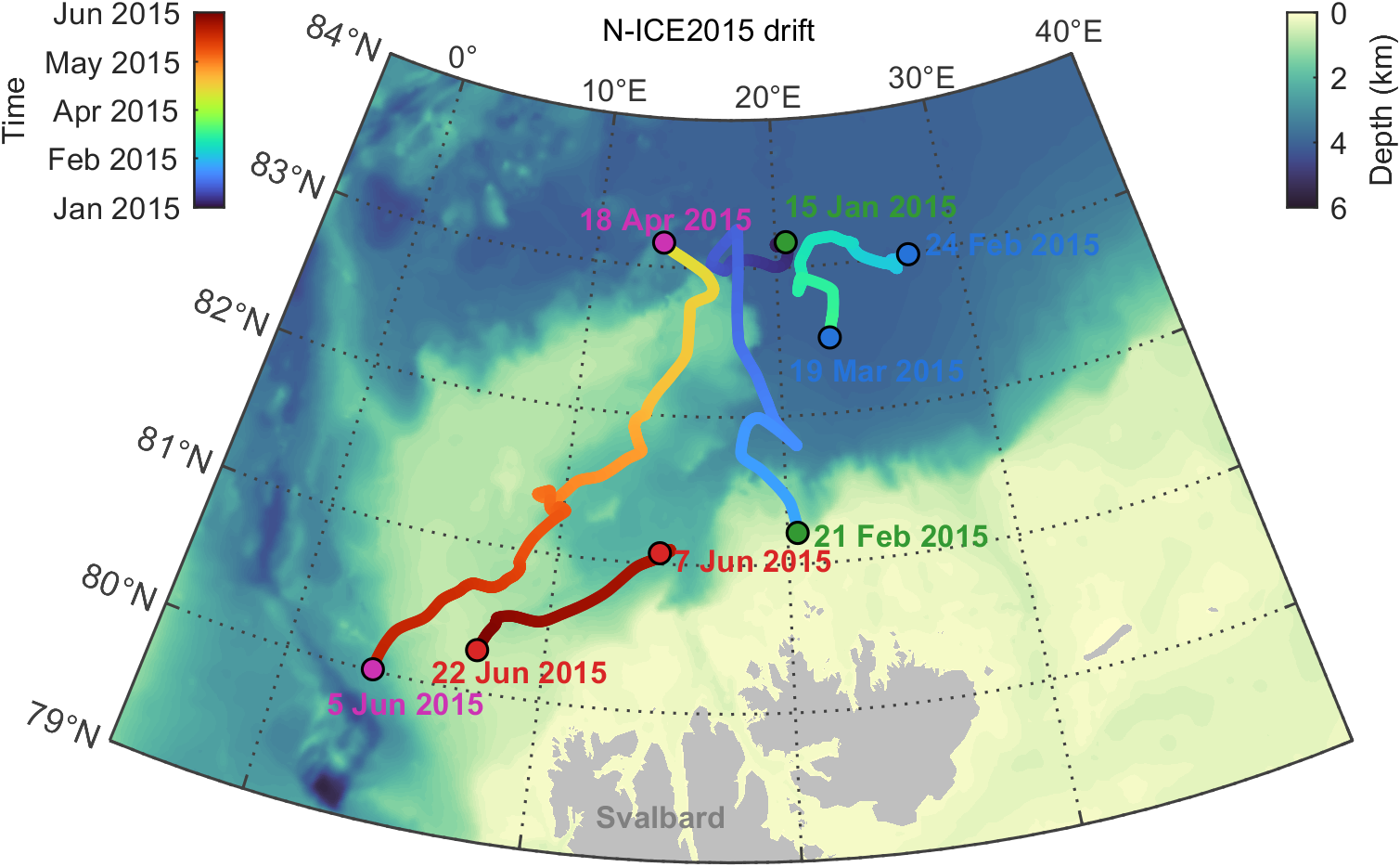
- Map showing drift of the N-ICE2015 expedition.
- Country: Norway
- Leader: Norwegian Polar Institute
- Start: North of Svalbard; January 2015
- End: June 2015
- Goal: Investigation of thin Arctic sea ice and associated climate processes
- Ships: RV Lance

N-ICE2015 (Norwegian Young Sea ICE expedition 2015) was an Arctic research expedition conducted from January to June 2015 north of Svalbard. The expedition was led by the Norwegian Polar Institute and involved an international team studying interactions between sea ice, ocean, atmosphere, and ecosystems under conditions dominated by thin, first-year ice.

The expedition used a drifting observational approach, with the research vessel RV Lance frozen into sea ice and allowed to drift with the pack ice over several months.

== Background ==
Arctic sea ice has undergone substantial changes in recent decades, including reductions in thickness and extent and a shift from multiyear ice to predominantly seasonal ice. These changes are particularly pronounced in the Atlantic sector of the Arctic Ocean north of Svalbard.

Before N-ICE2015, wintertime observations in regions dominated by thin ice were limited. The expedition was designed to improve understanding of physical and biogeochemical processes in this evolving ice regime, including air–ice–ocean interactions, snow processes, and ecosystem dynamics.

These developments reflect a broader transition in polar research from geographic exploration toward process-based climate observations. The N-ICE2015 expedition has been described as part of this shift, with a focus on continuous in situ measurements of atmospheric boundary layer structure, cloud properties, surface energy fluxes, and their interaction with sea ice and the upper ocean, contributing to improved representation of Arctic processes in weather and climate models.

In contrast to earlier campaigns such as the SHEBA experiment, which focused on thicker multiyear ice, N-ICE2015 targeted a thinner and more dynamic ice regime. The expedition preceded later large-scale drift experiments such as the MOSAiC Expedition, which also employed a drifting observatory to study atmosphere–ice–ocean interactions in the Arctic.

== Expedition ==
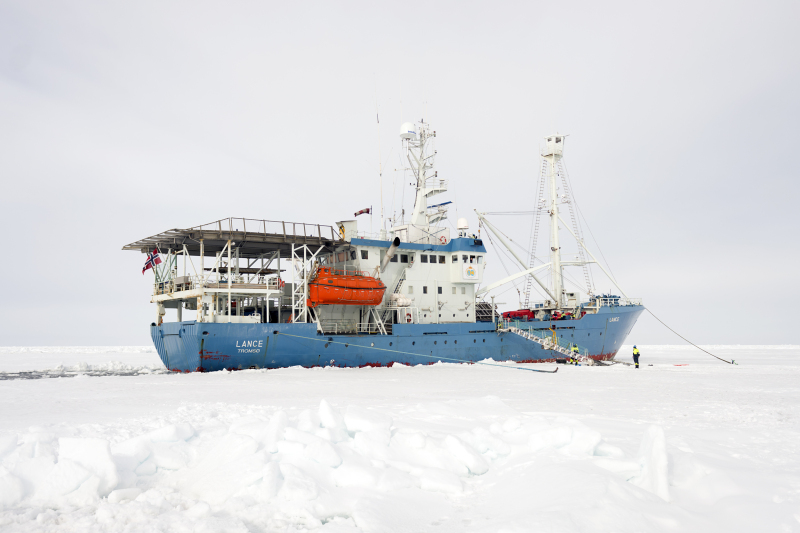
RV Lance, the research vessel used during the N-ICE2015 expedition.

The expedition was conducted aboard the Norwegian research vessel RV Lance, which was intentionally frozen into the sea ice and drifted with it north of Svalbard. The campaign comprised four main drift periods between January and June 2015, covering winter and spring conditions. During these drift periods, measurements were conducted on several individual ice floes, including four principal floes that served as platforms for repeated observations and instrument deployments.

During the expedition, researchers established temporary ice camps on nearby floes and carried out coordinated measurements of:

- sea ice thickness, structure, and deformation
- snow depth and physical properties
- ocean temperature, salinity, and circulation
- atmospheric conditions and surface energy fluxes
- biological activity in sea ice, snow, and the upper ocean

The drifting platform enabled continuous observations through the polar night and the seasonal transition to spring.

== Scientific results ==
The N-ICE2015 expedition produced an extensive observational dataset describing thin Arctic sea ice conditions and associated atmosphere–ice–ocean interactions. Results indicate that sea ice north of Svalbard during the study period was thinner, more mobile, and more strongly influenced by atmospheric forcing than in earlier observations.

=== Sea ice dynamics ===
Studies of sea ice dynamics based on buoy arrays showed that the ice cover experienced multiple deformation events during the expedition, including a major storm in early February 2015 that significantly weakened the ice and increased its mobility. Analysis of deformation scaling indicated a transition toward more freely drifting and mechanically weaker ice conditions, consistent with a thinner and younger ice pack.

Studies of pressure ridges further demonstrated that thermodynamic processes during the decay phase significantly influenced ridge structure and evolution, highlighting the role of melt and heat exchange in the seasonal transformation of deformed ice. Observations from ice mass balance buoys showed that ridges melted 4–5 times faster than level (undeformed) ice during summer.

=== Atmospheric processes ===
Atmospheric studies during N-ICE2015 documented the influence of winter storm regimes in the Atlantic sector of the Arctic. These storms transported heat and moisture into the region, reduced radiative cooling, and suppressed sea ice growth.

A synthesis of the N-ICE2015 dataset demonstrated that winter storms played a central role in the evolution of sea ice in the Atlantic sector of the Arctic Ocean. These events transported heat and moisture into the region, increased snowfall, fractured the ice cover, and enhanced ocean–ice–atmosphere heat exchange, with effects that persisted beyond individual storm events.

=== Ocean and thermodynamic processes ===
Oceanographic and thermodynamic studies showed that heat fluxes from the ocean to the atmosphere were enhanced in regions of thin ice and open leads. Measurements of turbulent fluxes beneath the ice indicated active upper-ocean mixing and significant ocean–ice heat exchange, influencing sea ice growth and melt processes.

Direct microstructure measurements further indicated elevated turbulent mixing rates beneath the ice and variable vertical heat fluxes from the upper ocean during winter and spring, contributing to basal ice melt and influencing seasonal ice evolution.

=== Snow and surface processes ===
Snow cover was also found to play an important role in modulating ice mass balance and insulating the ice. Detailed observations of winter snow conditions during the expedition showed that the snowpack was highly variable in depth and structure, strongly influenced by wind redistribution and episodic snowfall associated with storms. The relatively thick and heterogeneous snow cover contributed to insulation of the ice and promoted negative freeboard conditions in some areas.

Observations also documented frequent flooding events associated with negative freeboard conditions, where the weight of snow depressed the ice surface below sea level. These events promoted the formation of snow–ice layers, particularly following storm-driven snowfall and enhanced basal melt.

=== Ecosystem processes ===
The expedition also documented ecosystem processes, including biological activity in sea ice, snow, and the upper ocean, and highlighted the coupling between physical conditions and Arctic marine productivity under thin ice conditions.

Biological activity was found to be highly heterogeneous, with enhanced algal growth occurring in features such as pressure ridges and at the snow–ice interface, forming localized “hot spots” of productivity.

Studies of refrozen leads showed that increased light transmission through thin ice created favorable conditions for ice algal growth, highlighting the importance of small-scale ice features for biological activity.

Together, these studies highlight the role of thin ice, snow cover, ocean heat fluxes, and episodic storm events in shaping the Arctic sea ice system, emphasizing the importance of atmospheric forcing and ice dynamics in a changing Arctic.

== Legacy and impact ==
The N-ICE2015 dataset has been used in intercomparison studies to improve the representation of sea-ice biogeochemistry in numerical models, highlighting its continued relevance for Arctic climate research.

== See also ==
- Arctic exploration
- MOSAiC Expedition
- Surface Heat Budget of the Arctic Ocean (SHEBA) expedition
- CONTRASTS Expedition
- Nansen's Fram expedition
- Polar exploration
