= Melt pond =

Pools of open water that form on sea ice in the warmer months of spring and summer

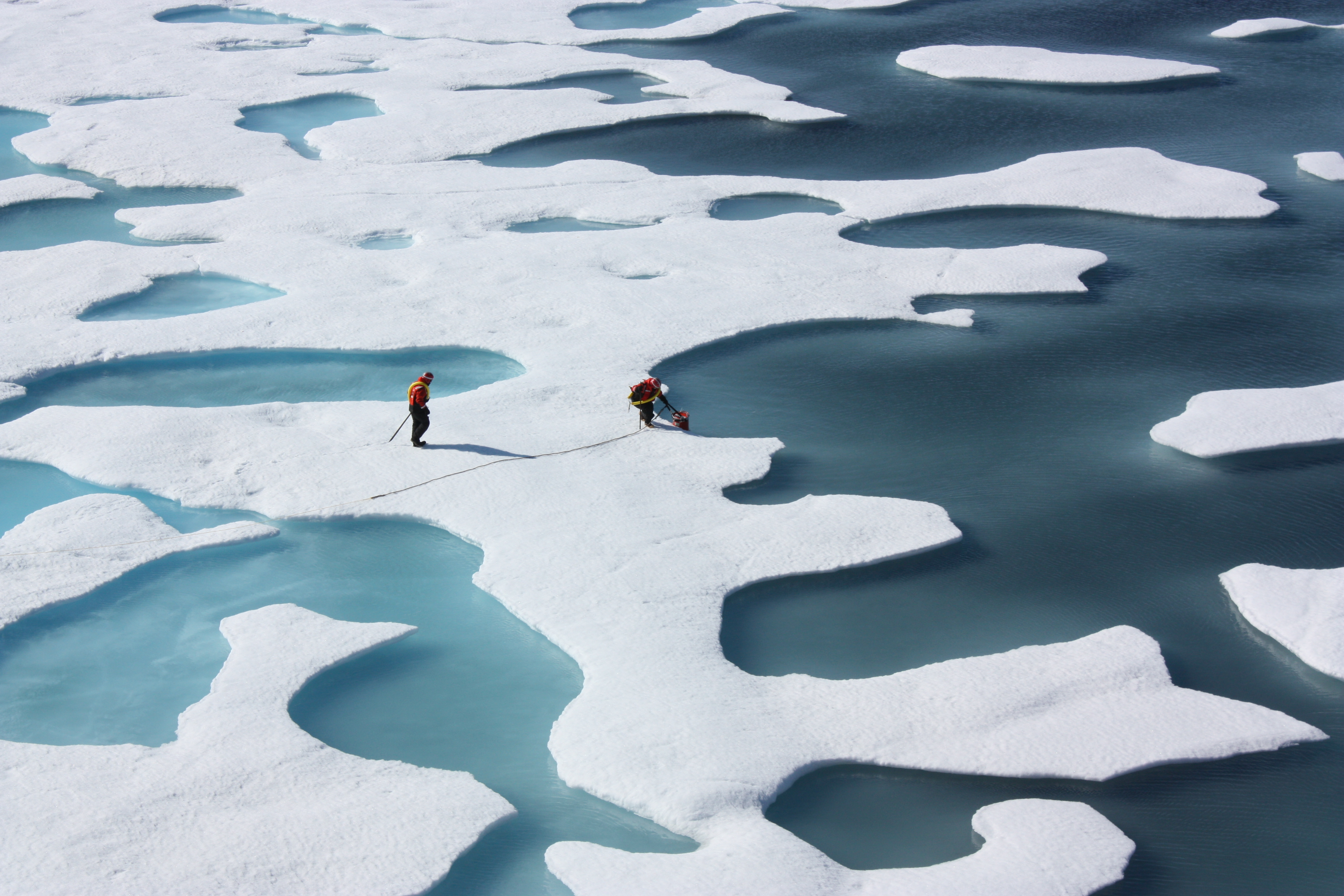
As ice melts, the liquid water collects in depressions on the surface and deepens them, forming these melt ponds in the Arctic. These fresh water ponds are separated from the salty sea below and around it, until breaks in the ice merge the two.

Melt ponds are pools of open water that form on sea ice in the warmer months of spring and summer. The ponds are also found on glacial ice and ice shelves. Ponds of melted water can also develop under the ice, which may lead to the formation of thin underwater ice layers called false bottoms.

Melt ponds are usually darker than the surrounding ice, and their distribution and size is highly variable. They absorb solar radiation rather than reflecting it as ice does and, thereby, have a significant influence on Earth's radiation balance. This differential, which had not been scientifically investigated until recently, has a large effect on the rate of ice melting and the extent of ice cover.

Melt ponds can melt through to the ocean's surface. Seawater entering the pond increases the melt rate because the salty water of the ocean is warmer than the fresh water of the pond. The increase in salinity also depresses the water's freezing point.

Water from melt ponds over land surface can run into crevasses or moulins – tubes leading under ice sheets or glaciers – turning into meltwater. The water may reach the underlying rock. The effect is an increase in the rate of ice flow to the oceans, as the fluid behaves like a lubricant in the basal sliding of glaciers.

== Effects of melt ponds ==
The effects of melt ponds are diverse (this subsection refers to melt ponds on ice sheets and ice shelves). Research by Ted Scambos, of the National Snow and Ice Data Center, has supported the melt water fracturing theory that suggests the melting process associated with melt ponds has a substantial effect on ice shelf disintegration. Seasonal melt ponded and penetrating under glaciers shows seasonal acceleration and deceleration of ice flows affecting whole icesheets. Accumulated changes by ponding on ice sheets appear in the earthquake record of Greenland and other glaciers: "Quakes ranged from six to 15 per year from 1993 to 2002, then jumped to 20 in 2003, 23 in 2004, and 32 in the first 10 months of 2005." Ponding in the extreme is lakes and lakes in association with glaciers are examined in the particular case of the Missoula Floods.

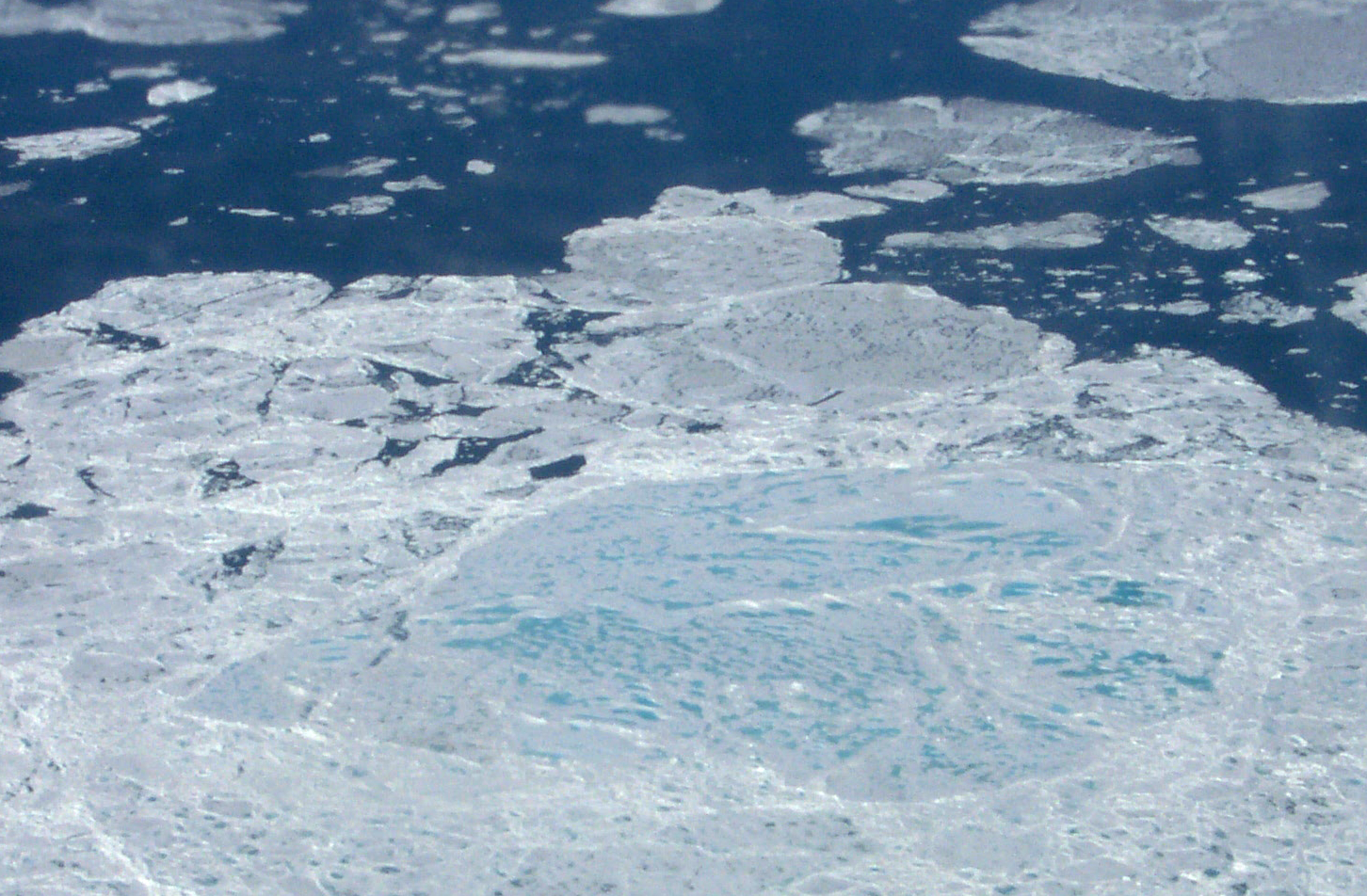
Melt ponds on sea ice in Baffin Bay

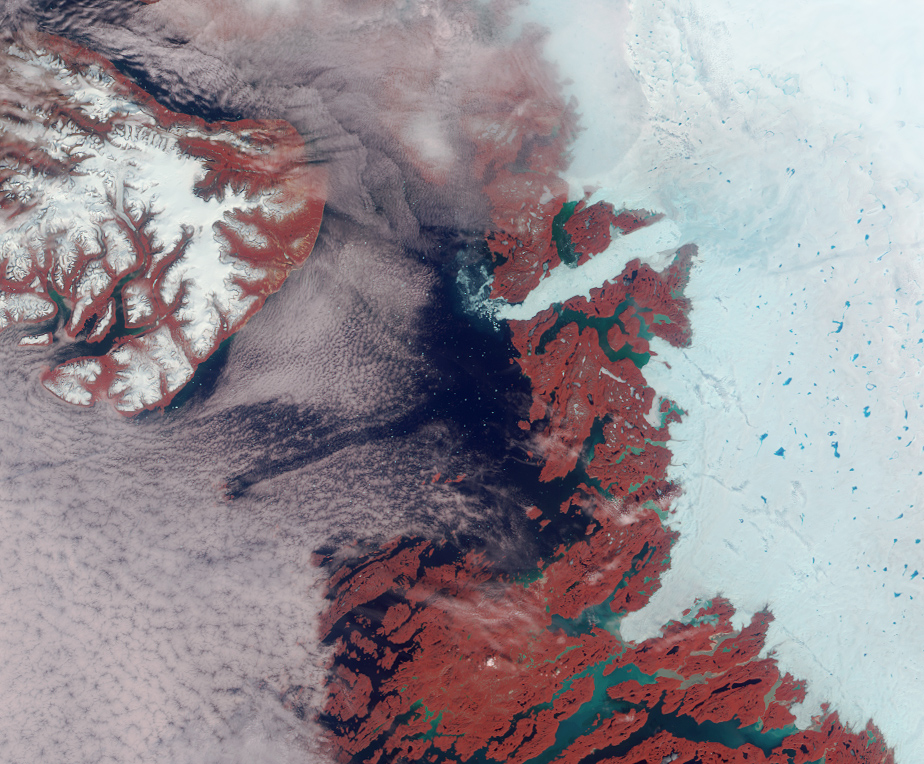
This false colour satellite image shows blue melt ponds in Greenland

== See also ==
- Moulin (geology)
- Glacier ice accumulation
- Antarctic ice pack
- Arctic ice pack
