= Ice mass balance buoy =

Method of measuring ice growth and melt

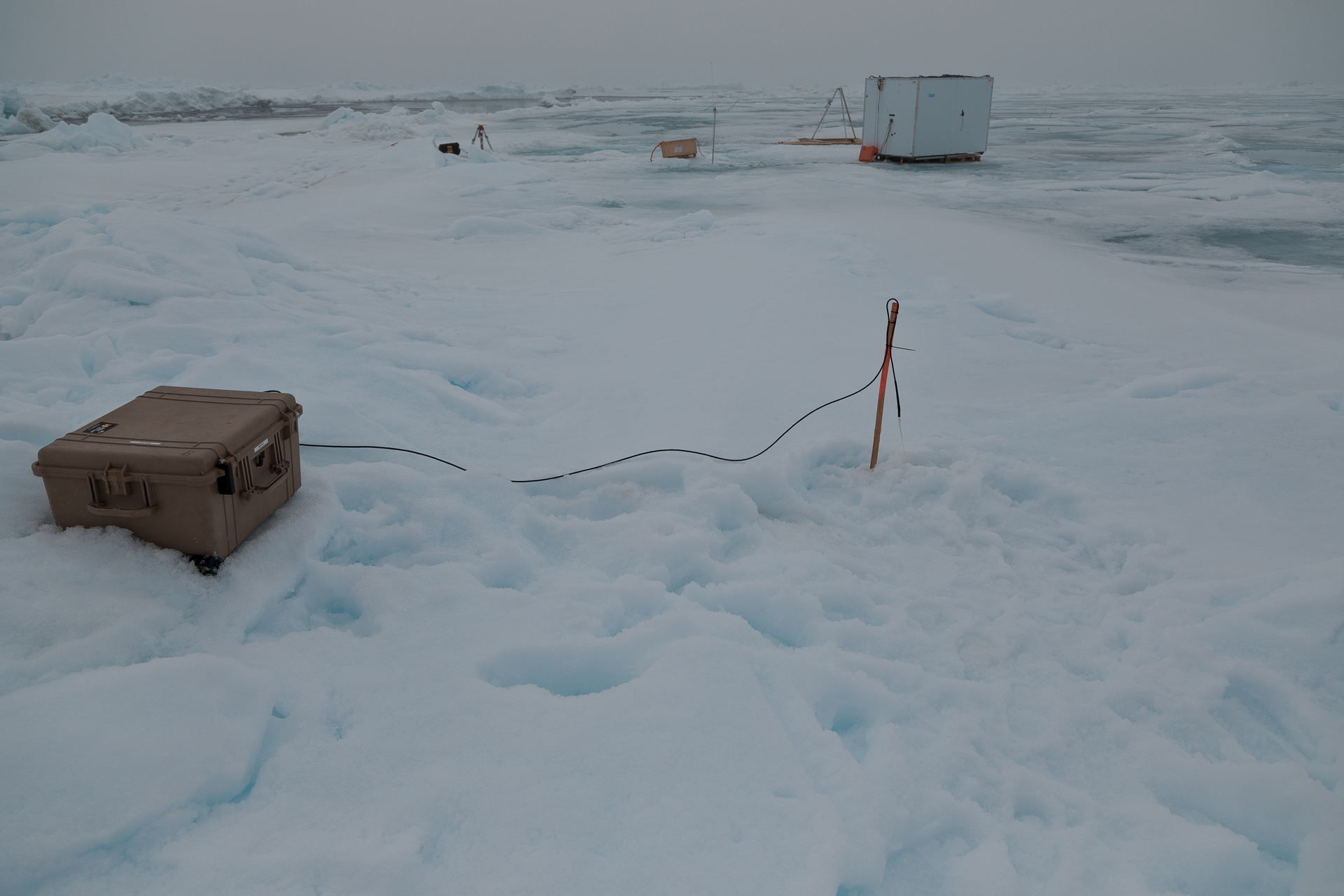
Ice mass balance buoy installed in pressure ridge during MOSAiC expedition

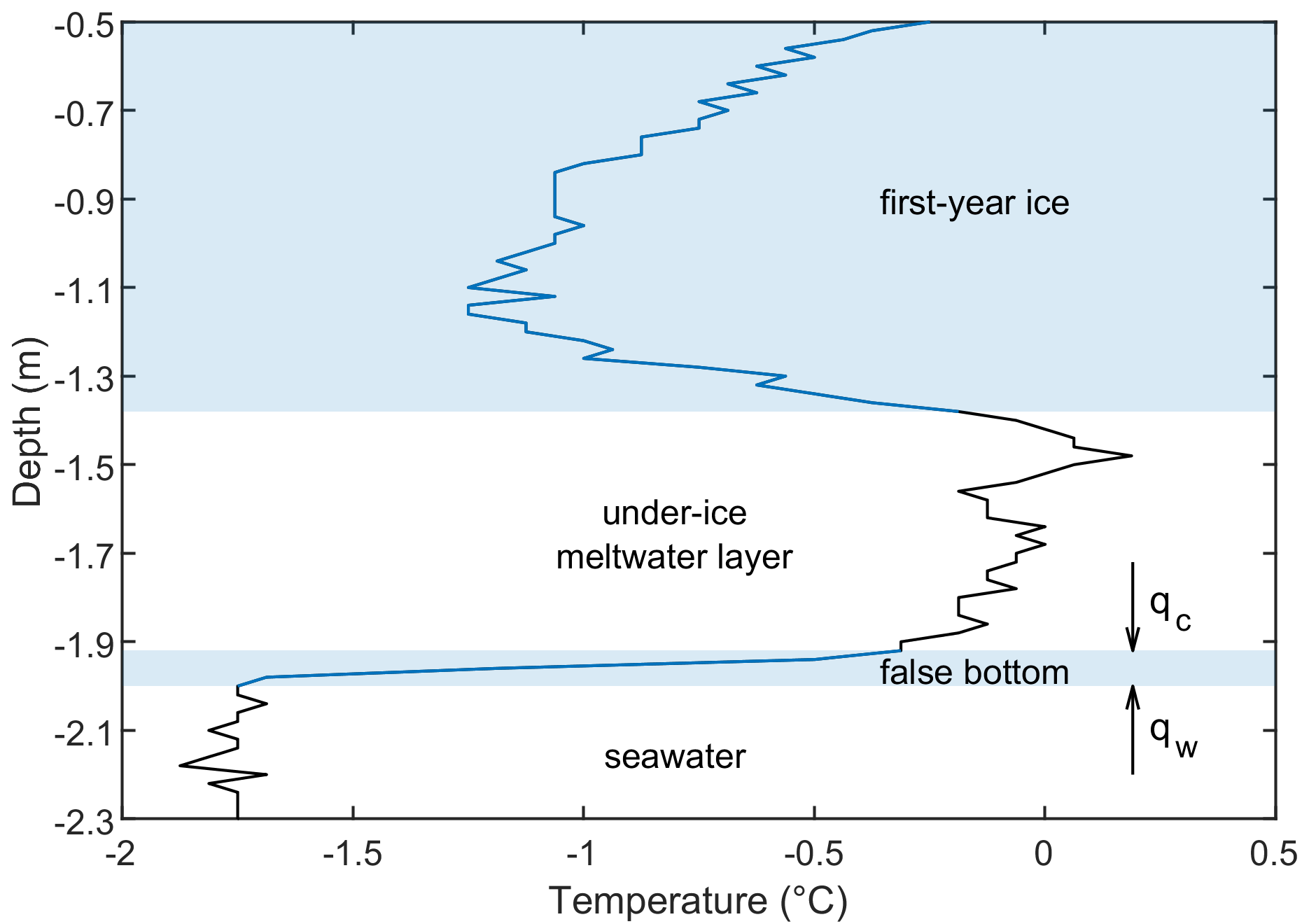
Temperature profile of melting sea ice measured by ice mass balance buoy

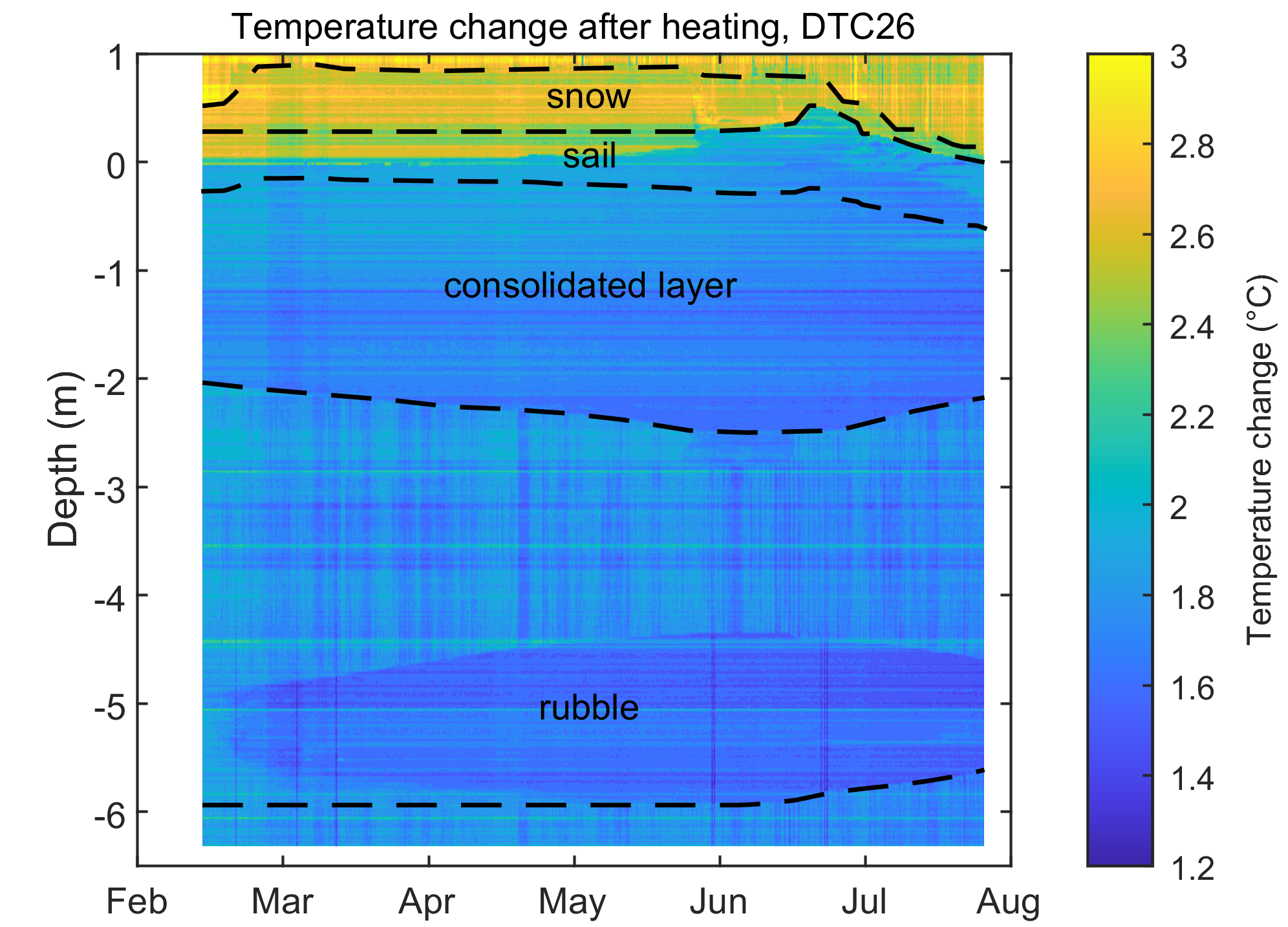
Pressure ridge interface temporal evolution obtained from ice mass balance buoy temperatures after heating cycle

An ice mass balance buoy (IMB) allows scientists studying sea ice to measure its temperature and the evolution of its interfaces remotely. The autonomous mass balance buoys usually consist of a data controller module and a temperature string. Some ice mass balance buoys also include acoustic sounders above and below the ice, measuring the positions of the snow-ice and ice-water interfaces.

== Types ==
The main types of ice mass balance buoys include

- The CRREL-Dartmouth Ice Mass Balance (IMB) Buoy
- Snow and Ice Mass Balance Array (SIMBA) from SAMS
- Seasonal Ice Mass Balance buoy (SIMB-1,2,3)

The CRREL-Dartmouth Ice Mass Balance Buoy (IMB) includes two ice-facing acoustic rangefinders, a vertical temperature string, and air temperature and pressure sensors. These sensors are connected to a non-floating satellite-connected transmission package. Seasonal Ice Mass Balance Buoy (SIMB-1). The SIMB-1,2,3 instruments have the same sensor package as the CRREL-Dartmouth IMB but are enclosed in a spar-type buoy hull to improve their performance during the melt season. The lower-budget Snow and Ice Mass Balance Array (SIMBA) from SAMS includes only a vertical temperature string and a non-floating satellite-connected transmission package.

== Characteristics ==
The main part of IMBs is a vertical chain of thermistors. The vertical spacing of the thermistors at modern IMBs is usually around 2–4 cm, while older versions had spacing around 10 cm. The accuracy of each sensor is generally within 0.1–0.5°C. Many modern IMBs measure in-situ temperatures and temperatures after a cycle of internal heating. In experimental fluid dynamics, such a mode is called a "hot-wire anemometer". In IMBs, the heat is added by applying an excitation voltage to the resistor bonded to the temperature sensor. The temperature response of the sensor during heating depends on the thermal diffusivity of the surrounding medium (for solids like snow or ice) and the flow rate of the medium (for fluids like seawater or air). The heat transfer in fluids depends on the fluid velocity, and the response usually varies over time scales. The measurements of the temperature response to heating may be used to discriminate different layers within the air-snow-ice-ocean system.

The thermistor chain is usually installed in a standard hole produced by a 2-inch auger. A weight is attached to the bottom end to keep it straight. The data is typically returned after each sample using the Iridium SBD system, while some buoys require manual data collection. During the deployment, the manual measurements of snow thickness, ice draft and freeboard, and location of IMB sensors are usually made. The IMB deployment disturbs the system around sea ice. For example, snow may have poor contact with the thermistor chain. Additionally, the 2-inch hole may refreeze very slowly if the air temperatures are high or the snow is deep. In summer, the presence of the chain may lead to additional solar energy absorption, which may influence the rates of snow and ice melt.

== Usage in research ==
IMBs were used in several Arctic and Antarctic expeditions, including the SHEBA expedition in Beaufort Gyre, N-ICE2015 expedition north of Svalbard, and the MOSAiC expedition across Transpolar drift.

The usage of IMBs revealed that in the Central Arctic regions with high sea ice concentration, surface and bottom ice melt are comparable. In contrast, in regions with low sea ice concentration, the amount of ice bottom melt is substantially larger. IMBs can also be used to show spatial and temporal variability of sea ice growth and melt, also providing an estimate of ocean heat fluxes. They can also be used for studying pressure ridges for analysis of their winter consolidation rates, for analysis of ridge consolidation during their warming, and to study effects of snow slush contribution to the ridge consolidation. IMBs also allow the study of the temporal evolution of under-ice meltwater layers, conditions of false bottom formation, and their effect on ice melt rates.

== Data availability ==
The raw temperature and acoustic sounder or heating data is available for CRREL-Dartmouth IMBs, CRREL-Dartmouth SIMB3 buoys, and for SIMBA buoys. The largest processed datasets with estimates of snow and sea ice thickness include 104 CRREL IMBs during 1993–2017, 82 CRREL IMB and SIMB3 buoys during 1997–2024, and 96 SIMBA buoys during 2012–2023. A significant amount of IMBs were deployed during the MOSAiC expedition, including snow and ice thickness estimates from 22 SIMBA buoys and 24 Digital Thermistor Chains.
