= False bottom (sea ice) =

Form of sea ice formed underwater between meltwater and seawater

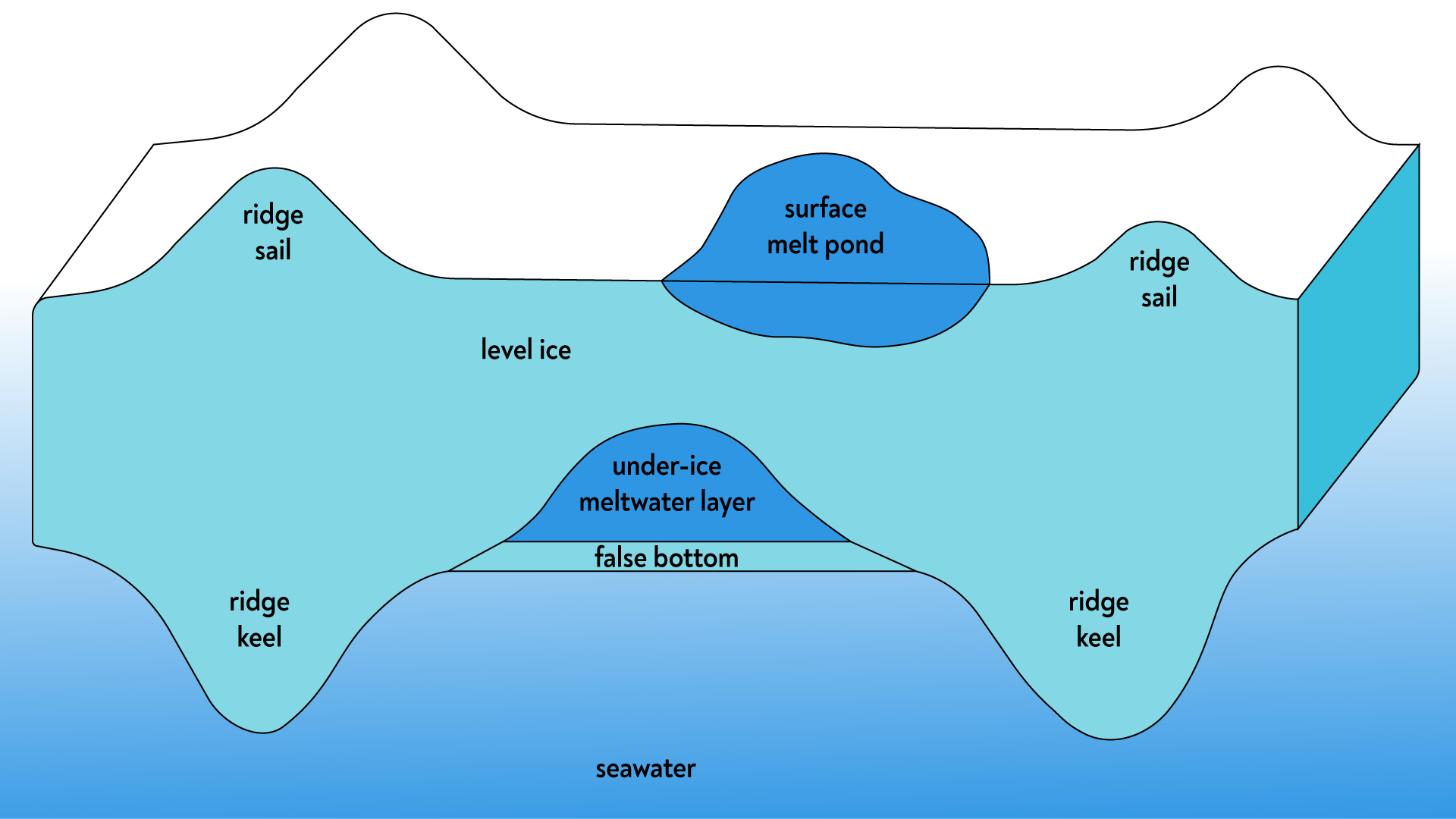
Scheme of false bottom formed under sea ice

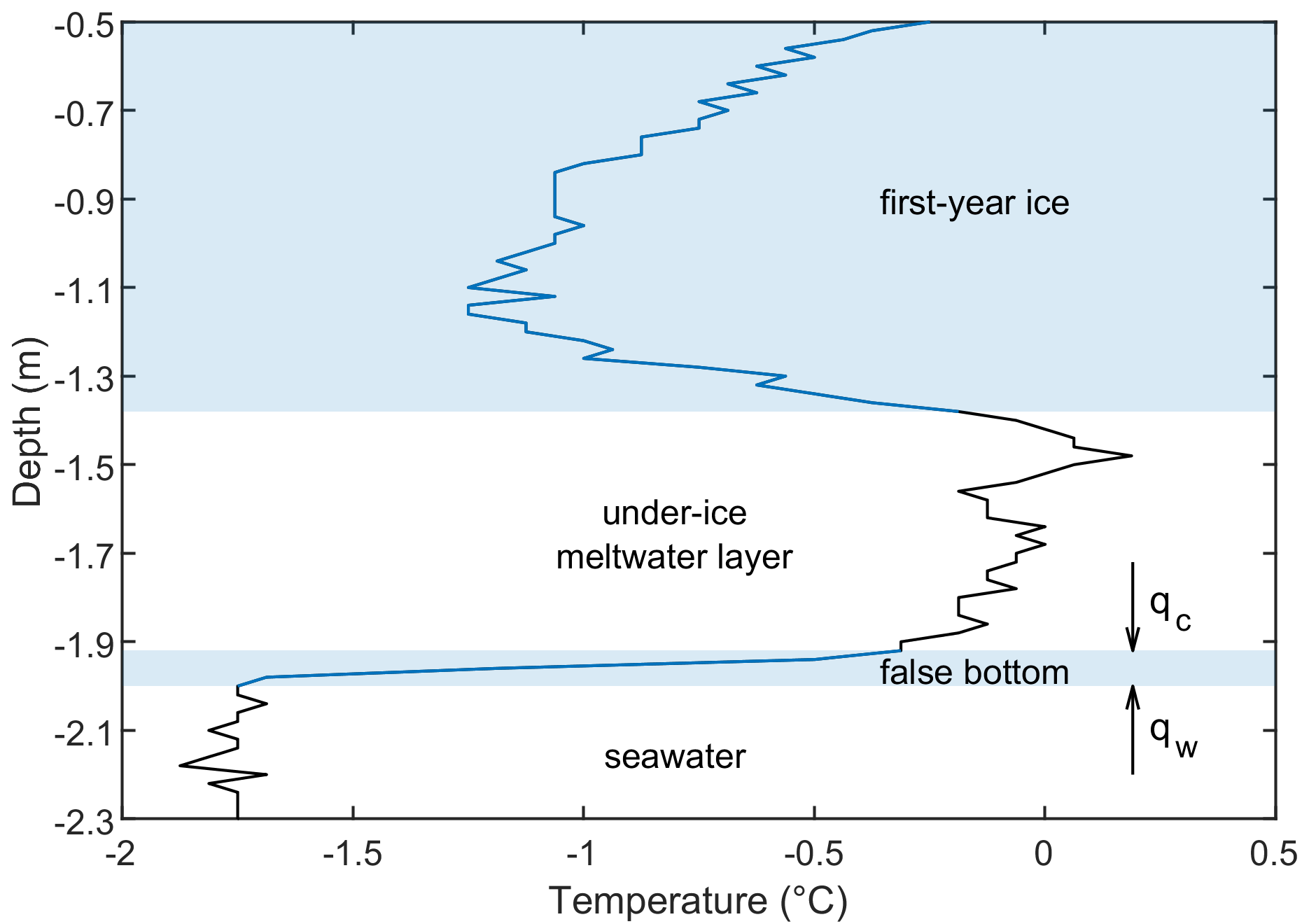
Typical temperature profile of false bottom

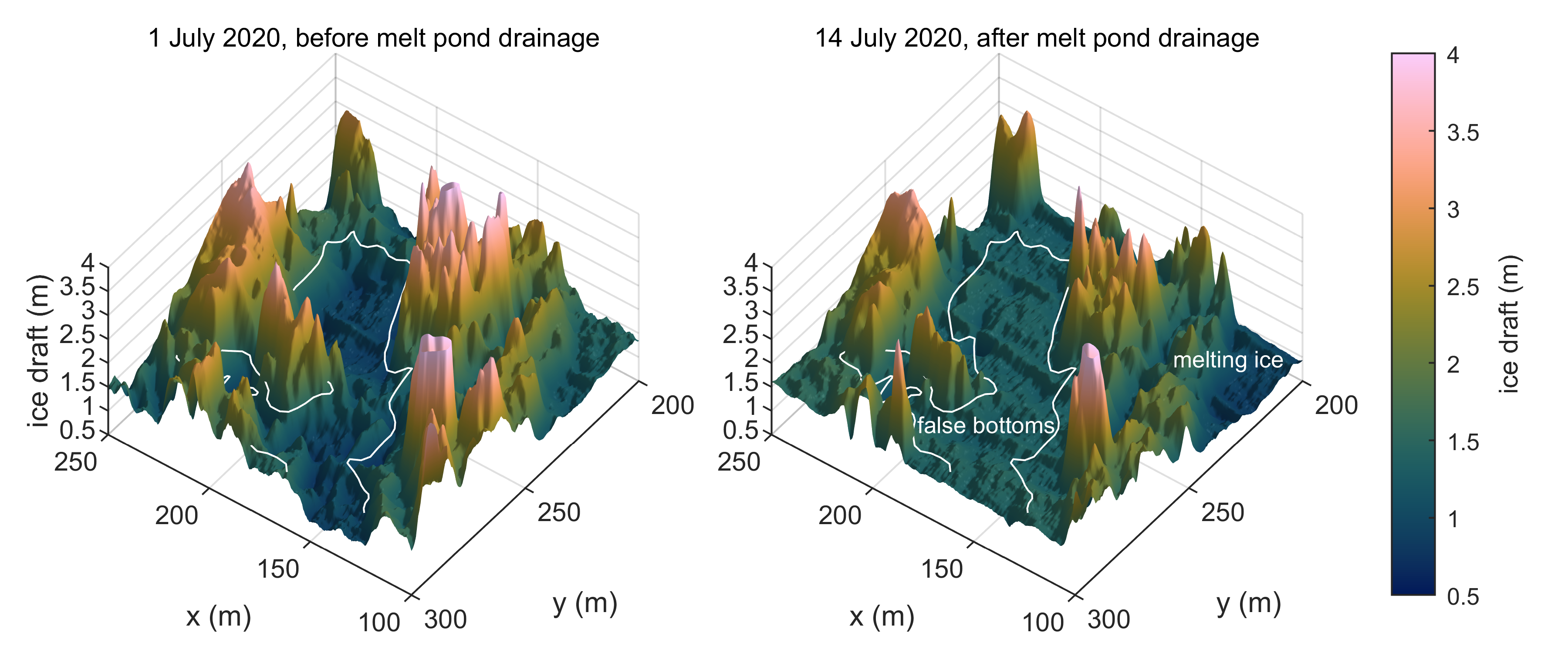
False bottom coverage at the surface plot of sea ice draft estimated using multibeam sonar measurements

False bottom is a form of sea ice that forms at the interface between meltwater and seawater via the process of double-diffusive convection of heat and salt.

== Characteristics ==
False bottoms have been observed under drifting Arctic sea ice, under land-fast ice in Greenland, and at Ward Hunt Ice Shelf. Being located under ice, false bottoms are not easy to investigate, and the current observations are quite variable. For example, the areal coverage of false bottoms was 50% at the drifting station Charlie in 1959, 15% during SHEBA expedition in 1998 and 20% during MOSAiC expedition in 2020. Both physical modelling and in situ observations suggest that false bottoms may decrease sea ice melt up to 8%. Meanwhile, measurements from manual ice thickness gauges in Fram Strait in the summer of 2020 showed a nearly 50% reduction in bottom ice melt due to false bottoms. The salinity and temperature of under-ice meltwater and false bottoms are controlled by both ice melt and desalination. The salinity of false bottoms was 1.0 during the ARCTIC 91 expedition, 0.4 during SHEBA and 2.3 during MOSAiC. The average thickness of false bottoms was 20 cm during the ARCTIC 91 expedition, 15 cm during SHEBA, and 8 cm during MOSAiC. The presence of false bottoms can increase the rates of sea ice desalination.

== Formation ==
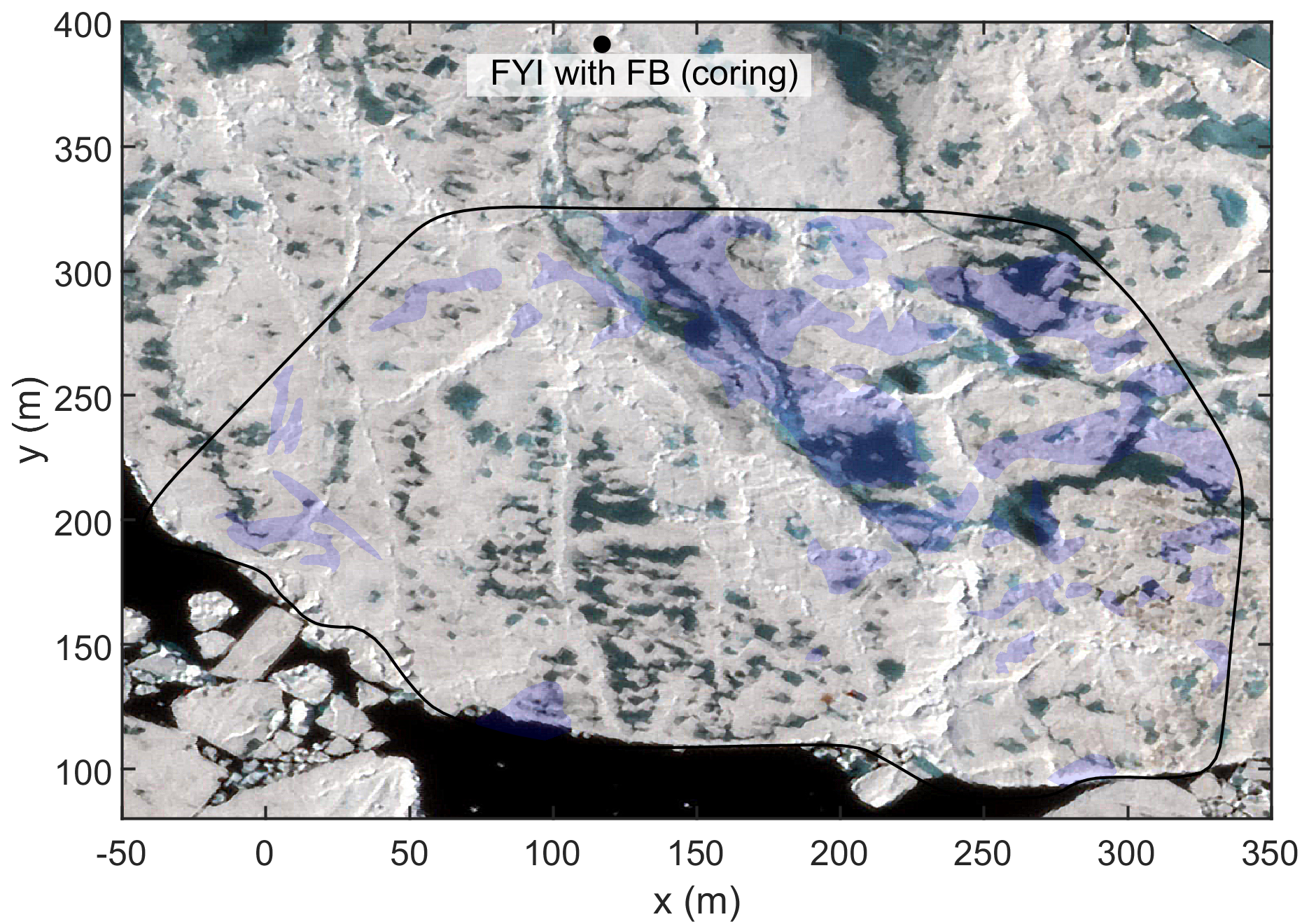
Areal coverage of false bottoms (blue-shaded areas) during MOSAiC expedition

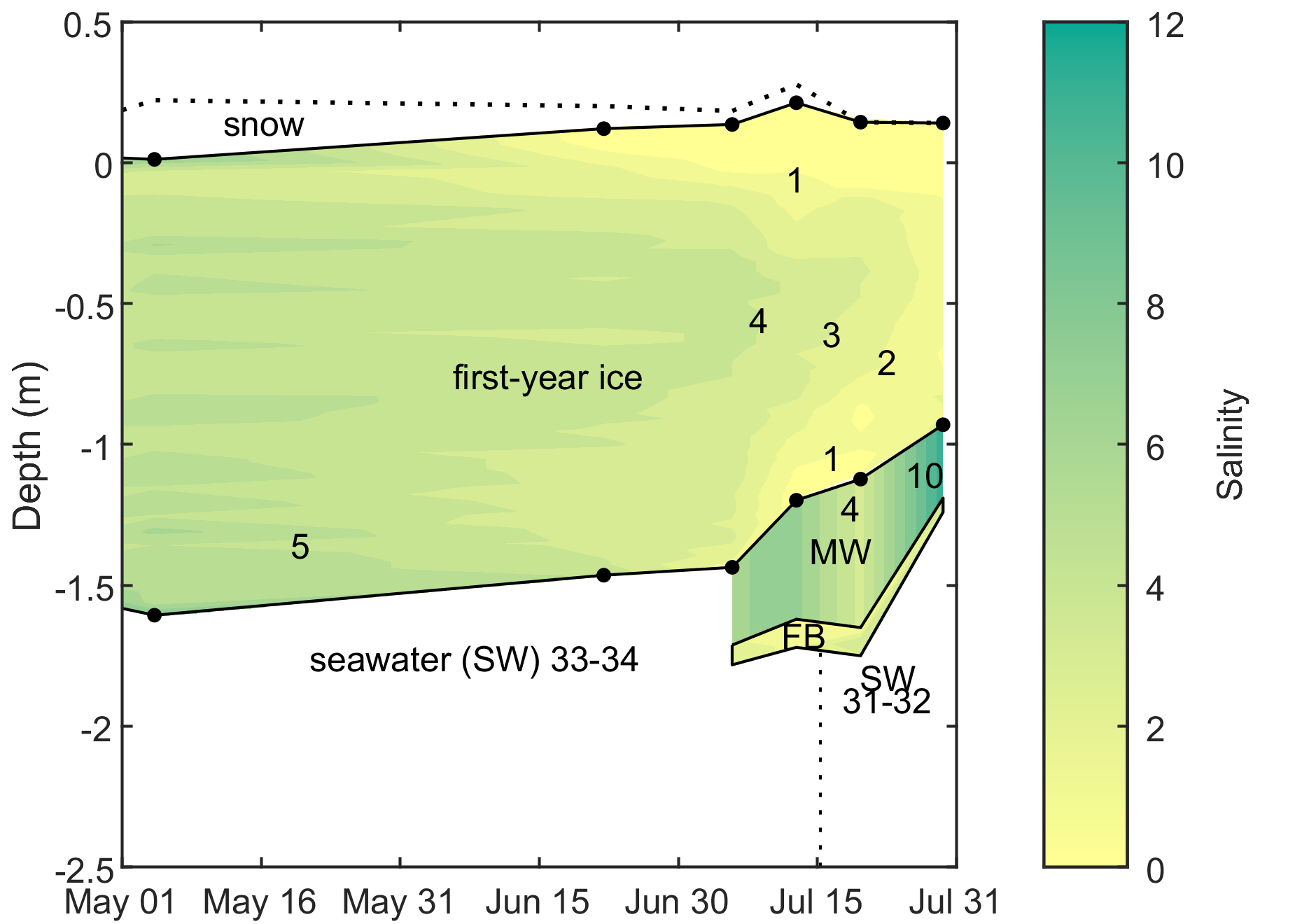
Temporal evolution of false bottom thickness and salinity during MOSAiC expedition

During Arctic summer, snow and ice melt results in the accumulation of low-salinity meltwater. Most of this meltwater is transferred to the ocean, while some of it migrates to the surface melt ponds, the sea ice matrix, and under-ice meltwater layers. False bottoms form due to a substantial difference in freezing temperatures of water with different salinities. Their formation in summer was first documented by Fridtjof Nansen in 1897. During MOSAiC expedition, false bottoms occurred in areas of thin and ponded sea ice encircled by thicker sea ice ridges and were formed at the same time when surface melt ponds drained. False bottoms are formed at the upper part of the interface of meltwater and seawater. The ice crystals initially grow downwards towards seawater, and further grow horizontally until a formation of a horizontal ice layer. After the formation of this horizontal layer, false bottoms constantly migrate upwards due to conductive heat flux, supported by the temperature difference between meltwater and seawater, and the rate of such migration is mostly defined by its thickness. The growth and melt of false bottoms are controlled by the physical parameters of the ocean. False bottoms are often observed in areas of thin ice covered by surface melt ponds and encircled by thicker pressure ridges, with ridge draft limiting the depth of under-ice meltwater layers.

== Under-ice meltwater layer ==
The false bottom formation is directly linked to the appearance of under-ice meltwater layers. The appearance of such meltwater layers often happens after surface melt pond drainage during the melt season. The depth of under-ice meltwater layers is usually limited by the draft of thicker and usually deformed ice, surrounding thinner ice with under-ice meltwater. The salinity of under-ice meltwater depends on the sources of meltwater including snow and ice, on the desalination of the ice above under-ice meltwater layers, and on the presence of false bottoms. During the MOSAiC expedition in Fram Strait, the average thickness of meltwater layers was 0.46 m under first-year ice and 0.26 m under second-year ice. The thickness of meltwater layers under multiyear ice during the SHEBA expedition in the Beaufort Sea was 0.35–0.47 m. Observations for fast multiyear ice in the Wandel Sea in North Greenland showed under-ice meltwater layers with 1.1–1.2 m thickness, later transformed into thick platelet ice layer with 0.01 m thick false bottoms under it.

== Observation techniques ==
False bottoms may create errors in estimates of sea ice thickness from its draft measurements. They can be investigated manually using ice coring and drilling, hotwire thickness gauges or remotely using underwater sonars. Ground-based upward-looking sonar cannot distinguish "normal" or parental sea ice from false bottoms. Similarly, drifting buoys measuring sea-ice temperature (ice mass balance buoys) cannot accurately detect false bottoms but can identify thicker under-ice meltwater layers.
