= Surface Heat Budget of the Arctic Ocean =

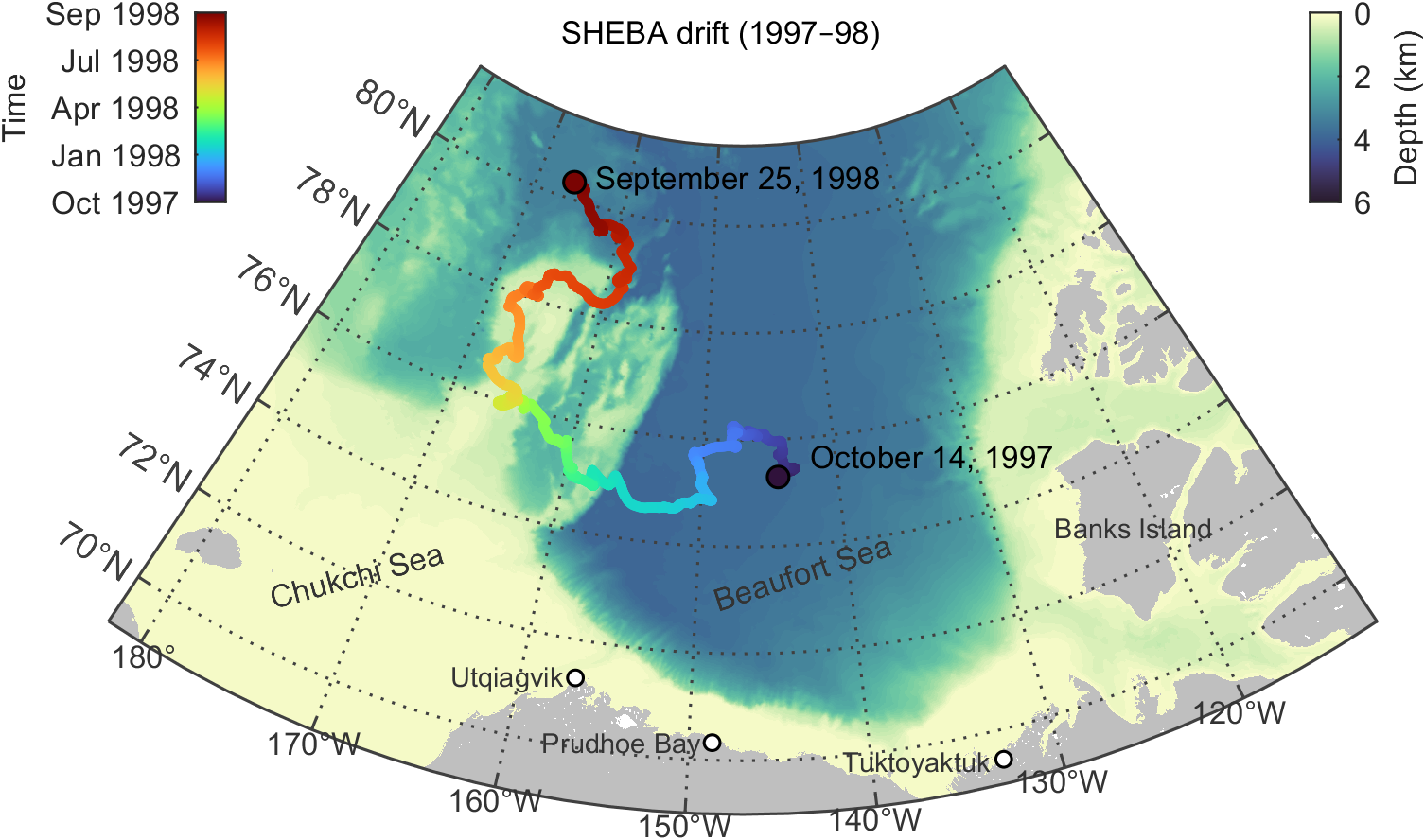
Drift track of the SHEBA expedition in 1997–1998

The Surface Heat Budget of the Arctic Ocean (SHEBA) study was a National Science Foundation-funded research project designed to quantify the heat transfer processes that occur between the ocean and the atmosphere over the course of a year in the Arctic Ocean, where the sun is above the horizon from spring through summer and below the horizon the rest of the time. The study was designed to provide data for use in global climate models, which scientists use to study global climate change.

== Background ==
Ice reflects sunlight more readily than open water. Snow-covered sea ice reflects about 80% of the incident sunlight. Seasonal changes in the Arctic result in clear skies and radiational cooling from snow-covered sea ice in the constantly dark Arctic winter. In spring, with the return of sunlight, melt pools begin to form and increase the rate of heat absorption from the sun. In summer, during continuous daylight, clouds form that reflect solar radiation while reducing heat loss from the ocean. In order to quantify these effects over a large portion of Earth's surface, studying the Arctic Ocean required a large-scale scientific data-gathering and analysis effort over the span of a year. Consequently, the National Science Foundation, together with other sponsors, funded a study to better quantify these processes.

== Ice Station SHEBA ==
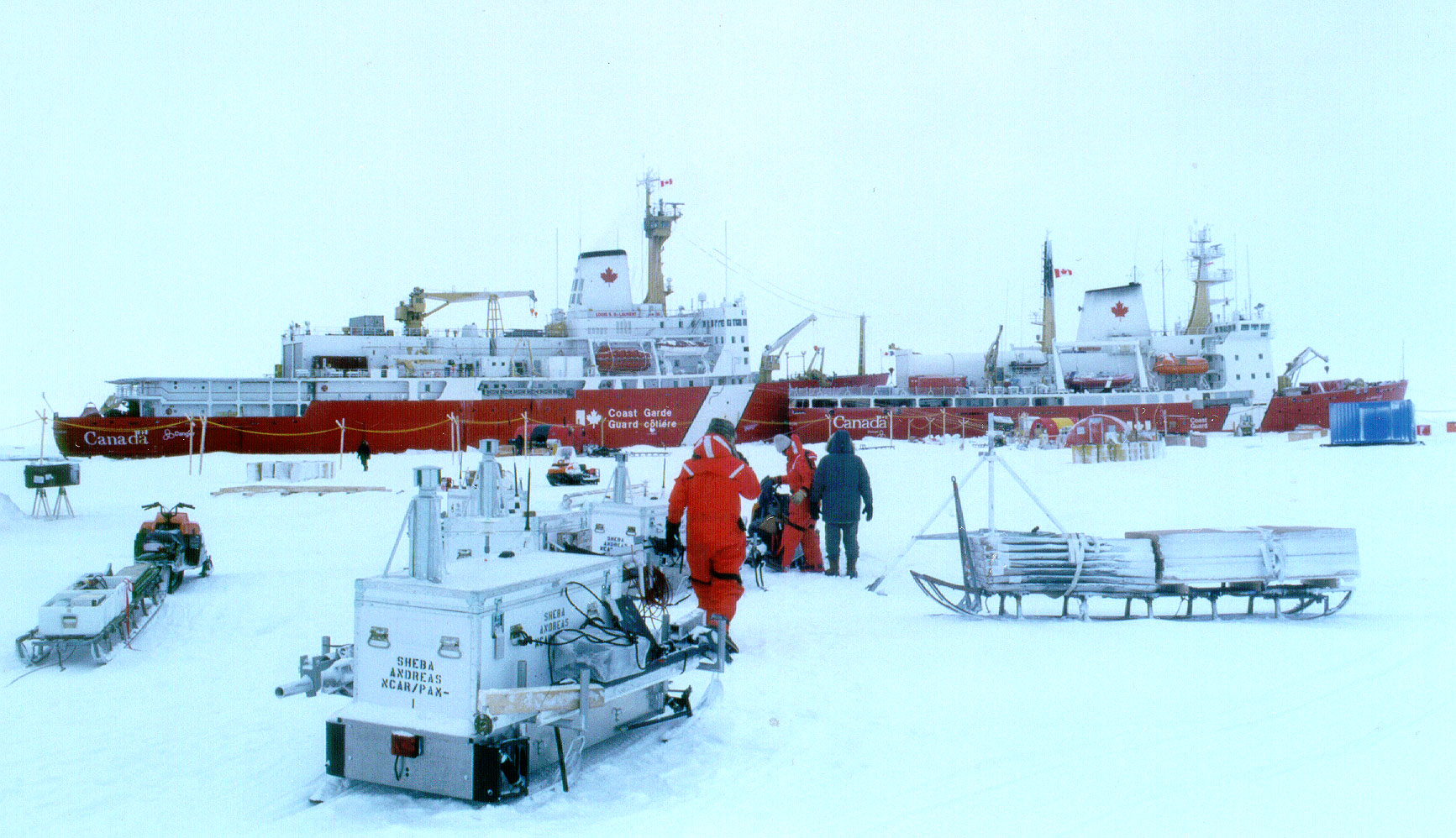
Ice station SHEBA base, Canadian Coast Guard Ship Des Groseilliers (right) with CCGS Louis S. St-Laurent.

The scientific party traveled aboard the Canadian Coast Guard Ship Des Groseilliers to the Arctic Ocean. It arrived at a location on 2 October 1997, where the plan was to allow the ship to become frozen in the pack ice and be the base for scientific observations. The ice camp was established in the Beaufort Sea and subsequently drifted westward into the Chukchi Sea, allowing observations across different Arctic oceanic and atmospheric regimes. The experiment was designed as an integrated observing system combining surface-based measurements with aircraft and satellite observations to investigate Arctic cloud–radiation interactions and surface energy exchange processes. Those observations included measurements of the oceanic and atmospheric processes from the water beneath the ice, near the ship, to the top of the atmosphere. Measurements included:

- Radiative fluxes: longwave and shortwave
- Heat flux: turbulent fluxes of latent and sensible heat
- Cloud height, thickness, and other properties
- Processes of energy exchange in the boundary layers of the atmosphere and ocean
- Snow depth and ice thickness
- Ocean salinity, temperature, and currents

The ship remained stationary with respect to the ice for one year, leaving on 11 October 1998. It became known as "Ice Station SHEBA." The drifting observatory approach used during SHEBA was later adopted and expanded in subsequent Arctic expeditions, most notably the MOSAiC Expedition (2019–2020), which employed a similar year-long drift to investigate the Arctic climate system.

== Results ==
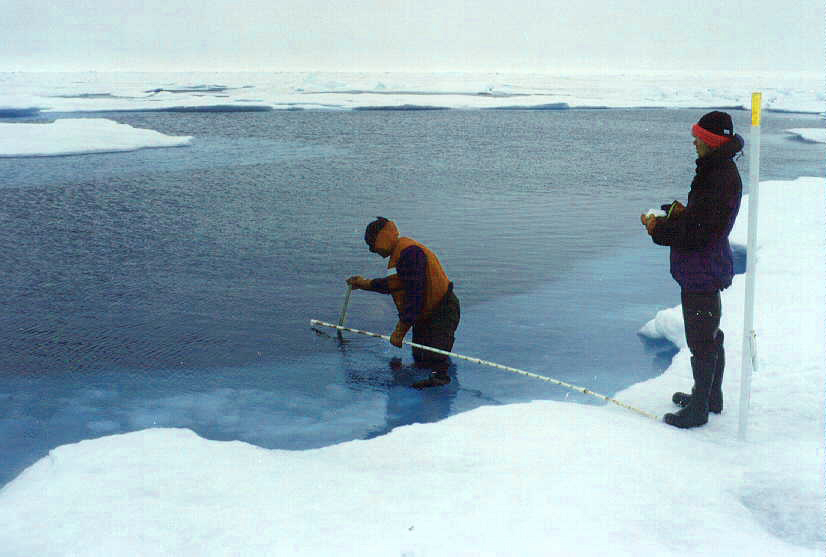
SHEBA researchers measuring lateral ablation of an ice floe.

Observations from SHEBA and related experiments highlighted the central role of clouds in controlling the Arctic surface energy budget, particularly through their influence on longwave and shortwave radiation. Clouds were found to be common at the ship's location throughout the year. In the midwinter, there was reportedly overcast 40% of the time, and in the summer, the sky was continually overcast. The air temperature was 0.6 °C lower than the regional climatological average temperature. With no sun in the winter, the net flow of heat (flux) was from the surface of the ocean to the sky, marked by large differences in flux with changes in cloud cover. In April, the flux changed toward solar warming of the surface of the sea, which reached a maximum in July when sunlight was strongest, and the ice developed melt ponds that were much darker than snow and could absorb sunlight more efficiently. Arctic cloud systems were frequently observed to persist in a mixed-phase state, containing both supercooled liquid water and ice crystals, which strongly influence the surface radiation balance and remain difficult to represent in climate models.

Measurements were also made of the net change in mass of the ice and snowpack at 100 sites. They noted a wide variability of change over the region surrounding the ship. They determined that, with the waning sunlight of fall, the temperature in the ice dropped such that, by November, it was generating new growth at the bottom of the ice pack. From these observations, they identified five phases of change in heat budget:

- Dry snow
- Melting snow
- Pond formation
- Pond evolution
- Fall freeze-up

The accurate measurements of ice mass balance from ablation stakes during SHEBA showed that the greatest surface melt was observed at ponded ice, while the greatest bottom melt was observed at pressure ridges. The bottom melt of pressure ridges was 60% higher than that of undeformed first-year ice. The energy flux from solar radiation to the ocean via leads was not enough to balance the observed bottom ablation. During the summer period, 15% of the under-ice area was covered by under-ice meltwater layers and false bottoms. The average depth of under-ice meltwater layers was 0.31 m with a salinity of 1.5. The average thickness of false bottoms was 0.2 m.

== Modeling ==
SHEBA observations provided critical validation data for atmospheric and climate models, particularly for improving the representation of cloud microphysics and radiative transfer processes in Arctic conditions. The experimental results allowed meaningful modeling of the seasonal heat budget processes occurring through the Arctic Ocean sea ice and atmosphere. The scope of the model was the column from below the ice pack through the top of the atmosphere. The scientists realized that the key to the model was correctly characterizing the changing reflectivity or albedo of the ice surface, owing to changes in snow pack and ice melting. Cloud cover was key to describing how much energy reached or escaped the ocean surface.

=== Ocean processes ===
The model incorporated the observation that solar radiation is the dominant heat source to the surface. It accounted for the change in the open ocean from a 5% maximum in June and the changes in albedo. Approximately 8% of incoming solar radiation was absorbed into the ocean through the ice.

=== Atmosphere processes ===
The scientists were able to define parameters for near-surface turbulence that characterize the degree to which air movement can cool or warm the surface of the ice, seasonally. In summer, the surface becomes rougher and slows down air flow. The lidar cloud measurements and balloonsonde temperature and turbulence data allowed scientific characterization of the role of the atmosphere above the ice in promoting or inhibiting the warming or cooling of the ocean surface.

== Participants ==
The following individuals and organizations participated in SHEBA:

Name	Affiliation	Location
Taneil Uttal and Janet Intrieri	NOAA/Environmental Technology Laboratory	Boulder, Colorado
Judith Curry and James Maslanik	University of Colorado	Boulder, Colorado
Miles Mcphee	McPhee Research Company	Naches, Washington
Donald Perovich and Thomas Grenfeld	Cold Regions Research and Engineering Laboratory, U.S. Army	Hanover, New Hampshire
Richard Moritz, Harry Stern, Andreas Heiberg, James Morison, and Ronald Lindsey	University of Washington	Seattle, Washington
Peter Guest and Timothy Stanton	Naval Postgraduate School	Monterey, California
James Moore	University Corporation for Atmospheric Research	Boulder, Colorado
Rene Turenne	Canadian Coast Guard	Quebec City, Quebec, Canada
Mark Serreze and Ola Persson	Cooperative Institute for Research in the Environmental Sciences	Boulder, Colorado
Donald Wylie	University of Wisconsin, Madison	Madison, Wisconsin
Clayton Paulson, Patricia Wheeler, and Scott Pegau	Oregon State University	Corvallis, Oregon
Chris Halle and Robert Pinkel	Scripps Institute of Oceanography	La Jolla, California
Alexander Makshtas	University of Alaska	Fairbanks, Alaska
Paul Welch	Freshwater Institute	Winnipeg, Manitoba, Canada
Matthew Shupe	Science and Technology Corporation	Boulder, Colorado
Knut Stamnes	Stevens Institute of Technology	Maplewood, New Jersey

== See also ==
- MOSAiC Expedition
- Nansen's Fram expedition
- CONTRASTS Expedition
- N-ICE2015 expedition
- Polar exploration
- Arctic exploration
