= RV Polarstern =

German icebreaker and research vessel

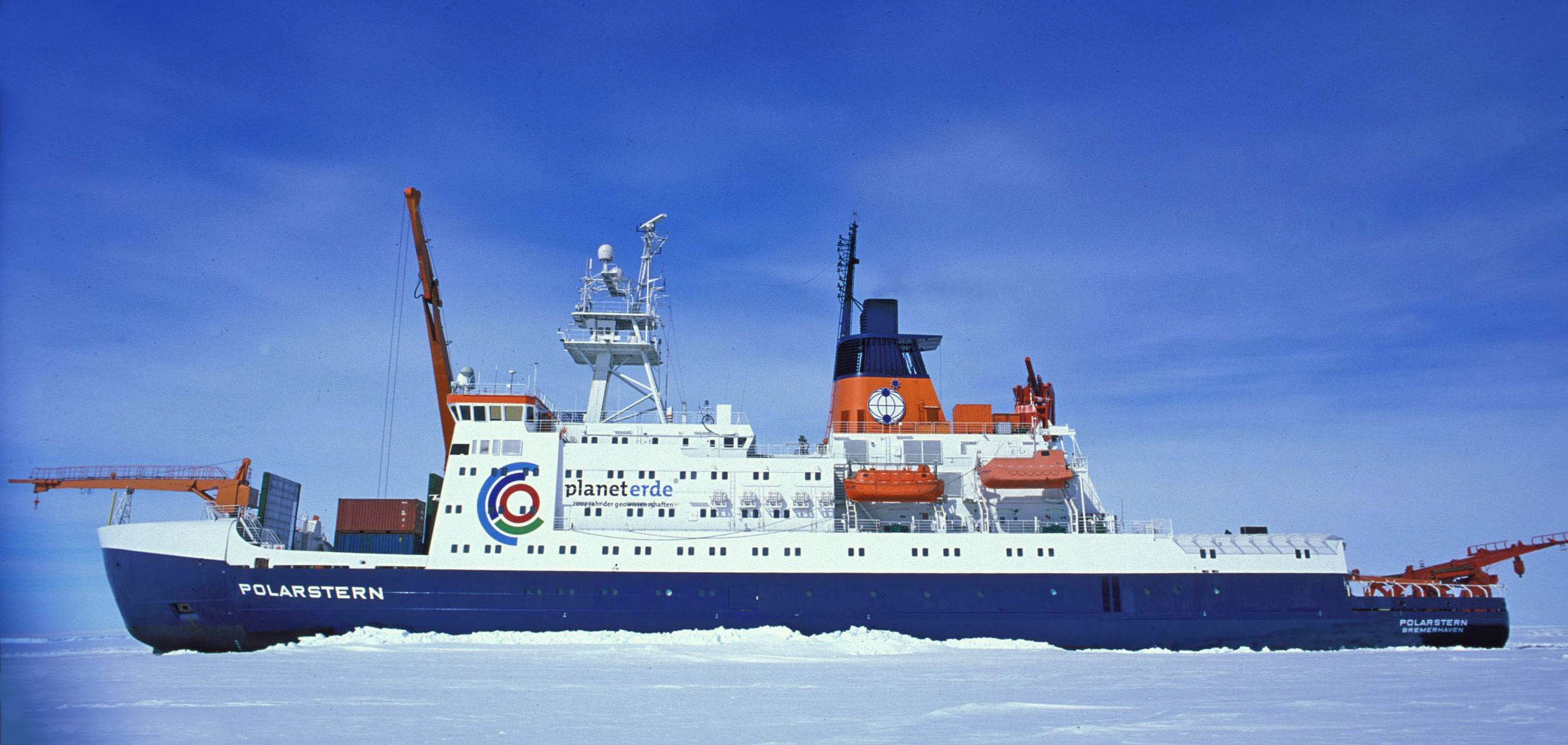

History

Germany
- Name: Polarstern
- Namesake: Polaris
- Owner: Bundesministerium für Bildung und Forschung
- Operator: Alfred Wegener Institute (AWI)
- Port of registry: Bremerhaven, Germany
- Route: Arctic and Antarctica
- Ordered: 28 August 1980
- Builder: Howaldtswerke-Deutsche Werft at Kiel and the Nobiskrug at Rendsburg
- Yard number: 707
- Laid down: 22 September 1981
- Launched: 6 January 1982
- Completed: 8 December 1982
- Identification: Call sign: DBLK; IMO number: 8013132; MMSI number: 211202460; DNV ID: G16829
- Status: in active service

General characteristics
- Type: Icebreaker, research vessel
- Tonnage: 12,614 GT
- Displacement: 17,300 tonnes
- Length: 117.91 m (386 ft 10 in)
- Beam: 25 m (82 ft 0 in)
- Draught: 10.7 m (35 ft 1 in)
- Installed power: Four diesel engines, 14,120 kW (18,940 hp)
- Speed: 15.5 knots (28.7 km/h; 17.8 mph)
- Capacity: 124 persons
- Crew: 44

RV Polarstern (meaning Polaris) is a German research icebreaker of the Alfred Wegener Institute for Polar and Marine Research (AWI) in Bremerhaven, Germany. Polarstern was built by Howaldtswerke-Deutsche Werft in Kiel and Nobiskrug in Rendsburg, was commissioned in 1982, and is mainly used for research in the Arctic and Antarctica. The ship has a length of 118 metres (387 feet) and is a double-hulled icebreaker. She is operational at temperatures as low as −50 °C (−58 °F). Polarstern can break through ice 1.5 m (4 ft 11 in) thick at a speed of 5 knots (9.3 km/h; 5.8 mph). Thicker ice of up to 3 m (9.8 ft) can be broken by ramming.

== History ==
On 7 September 1991, Polarstern, assisted by the Swedish arctic icebreaker Oden, reached the North Pole as the first conventional powered vessels. Both scientific parties and crew took oceanographic and geological samples and had a common tug of war and a football game on an ice floe. In 2001, Polarstern together with USCGC Healy reached the pole again. She returned for a third time on 22 August 2011. This time she reported the most frequently recurring ice thickness at 0.9 m (2 ft 11 in) compared with 2 m (6 ft 7 in) in 2001.

On 2 March 2008, one of the vessel's helicopters crashed on a routine flight to the Antarctic Neumayer II base. The German pilot and a Dutch researcher were killed, and three other passengers were injured.

On 17 October 2008, Polarstern was the first research ship ever to travel through both the Northeast Passage and the Northwest Passage in one cruise, thus circumnavigating the North Pole.

The German government in 2015 issued a request for bids on the construction of a replacement for Polarstern, but did not award a contract and eventually withdrew the request in early 2020 as it no longer covered current technological demands for a long-term, efficient and economic vessel.

On 20 September 2019 Polarstern sailed from Tromsø, Norway, for a 12 to 14 month-long Multidisciplinary drifting Observatory for the Study of Arctic Climate (MOSAiC) expedition across the Arctic. She settled in an ice floe on 4 October 2019. The aim was drifting with this floe, passing the North pole and eventually reaching open water in the Fram Strait. While stuck in the ice in March 2020, a member of the aircraft team who had not yet joined the ship in the Arctic tested positive for COVID-19. This resulted in the entire aircraft team being placed in isolation in Germany and caused delays in the retrieval of scientific data from around the ship to provide context to the data taken aboard. After 389 days, this 2019 – 2020 arctic expedition successfully ended on 12 October 2020 when the research vessel safely returned to its home port of Bremerhaven, Germany.

A revised request for bids for a replacement, reflecting changes in technology since the first was issued, was expected, with Polarstern II possibly ordered in 2022 to enter service in 2026 or 2027. The new vessel could cost over €800m, and could include hybrid diesel-electric propulsion, integrated under-water robotic systems and several helicopter landing options.

In 2025 TKMS won the bid and state that construction will begin in 2027, with a predicted enter to service in 2030. The new costs are estimated at €1.2b, the new Polarstern will be around 160 meter long and have an ice class of PC2.

== Expeditions updates ==
Current listings of all cruises on board Polarstern as well as associated contents (e.g., tracklines, weekly reports, cruise reports, publications and data) are presented on the platform portal of the Alfred Wegener Institute (AWI) for Polar and Marine Research.

== In popular culture ==
The ship plays a central role in German musician Schiller's 2010 album Atemlos (German for breathless). A track is titled after the ship. It is also featured in the DVD of the same title, showing the musician's expedition on the vessel.

== Gallery ==
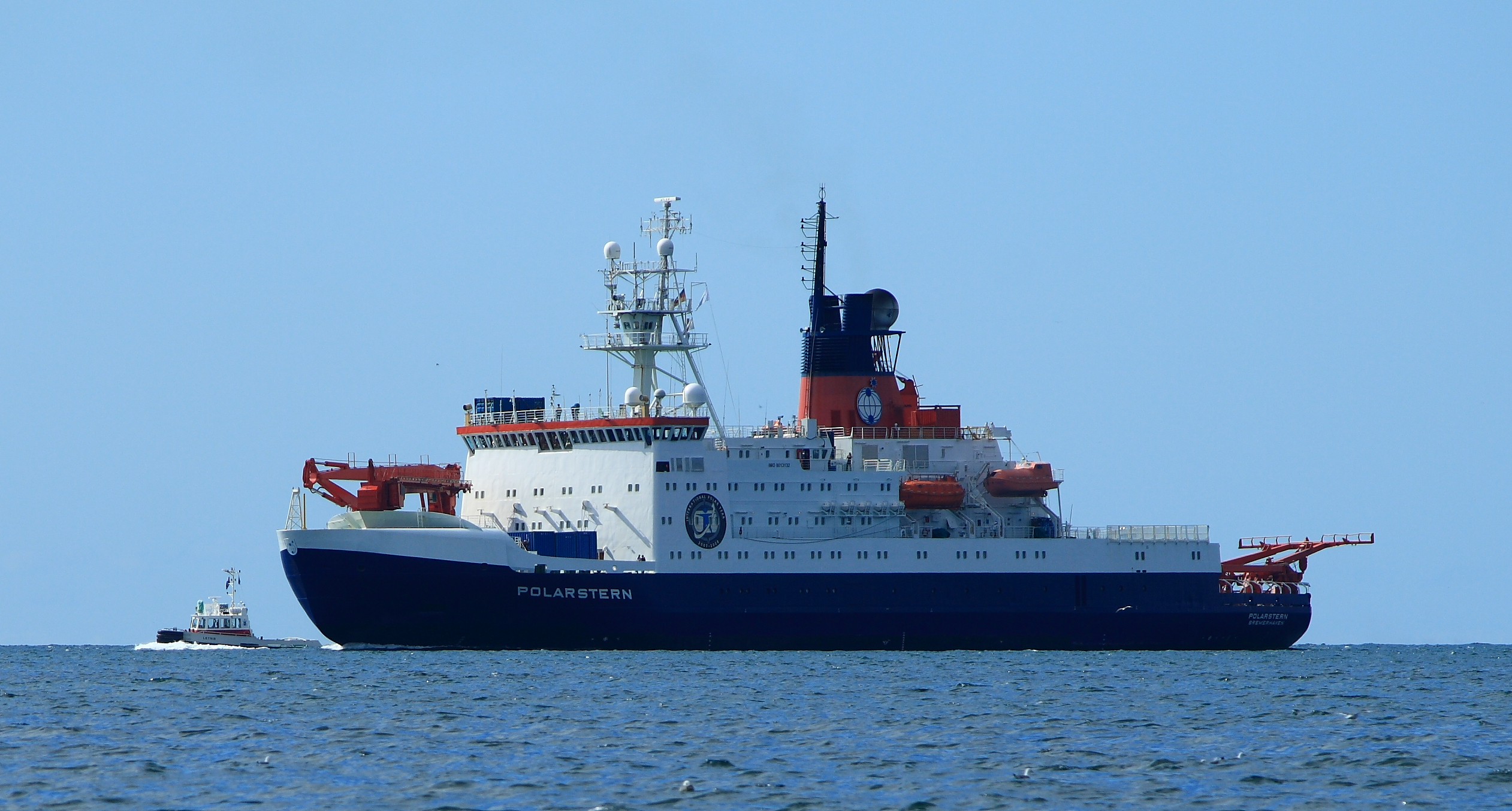
Polarstern near Reykjavík, Iceland

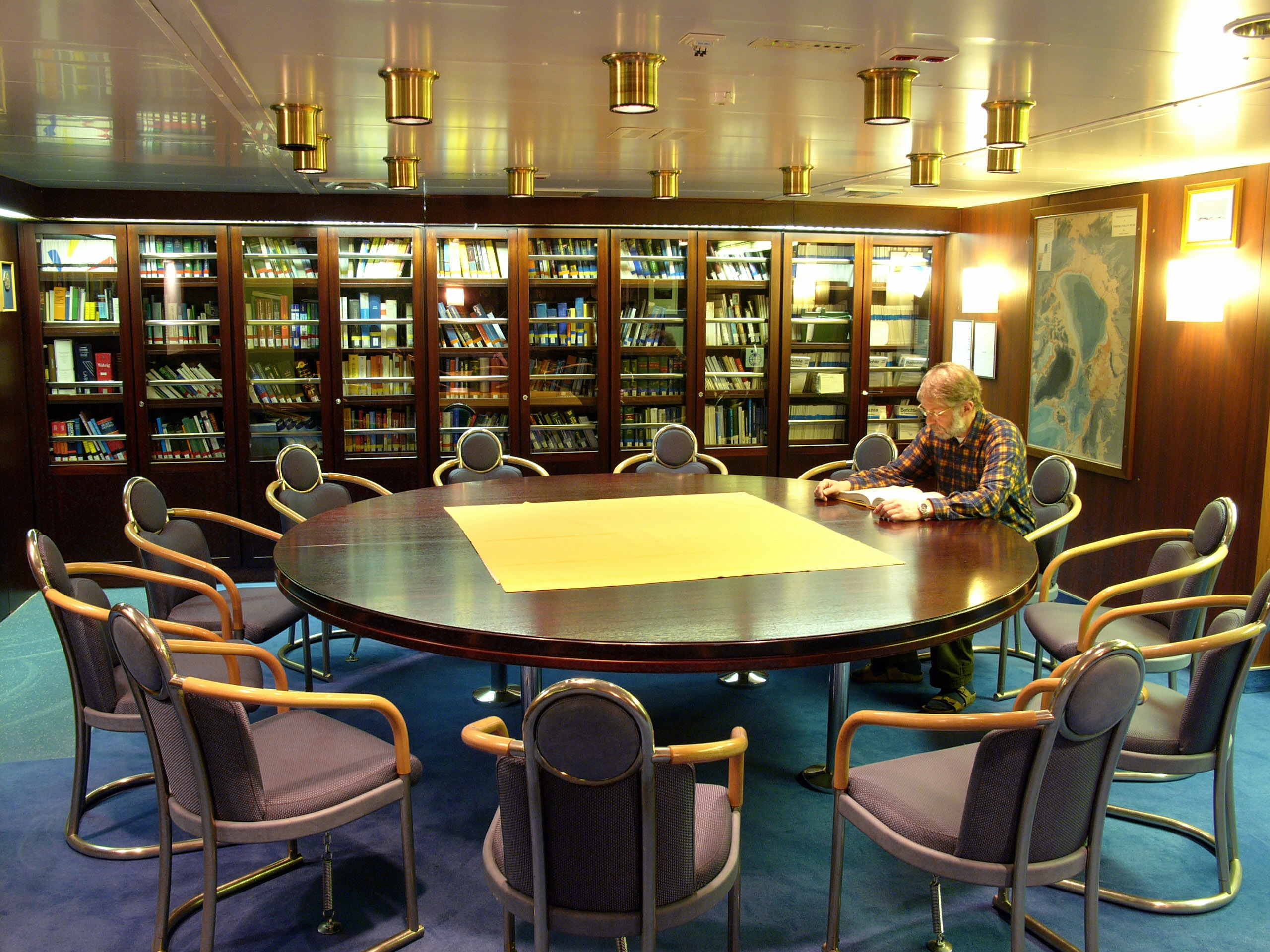
Library in the blue saloon

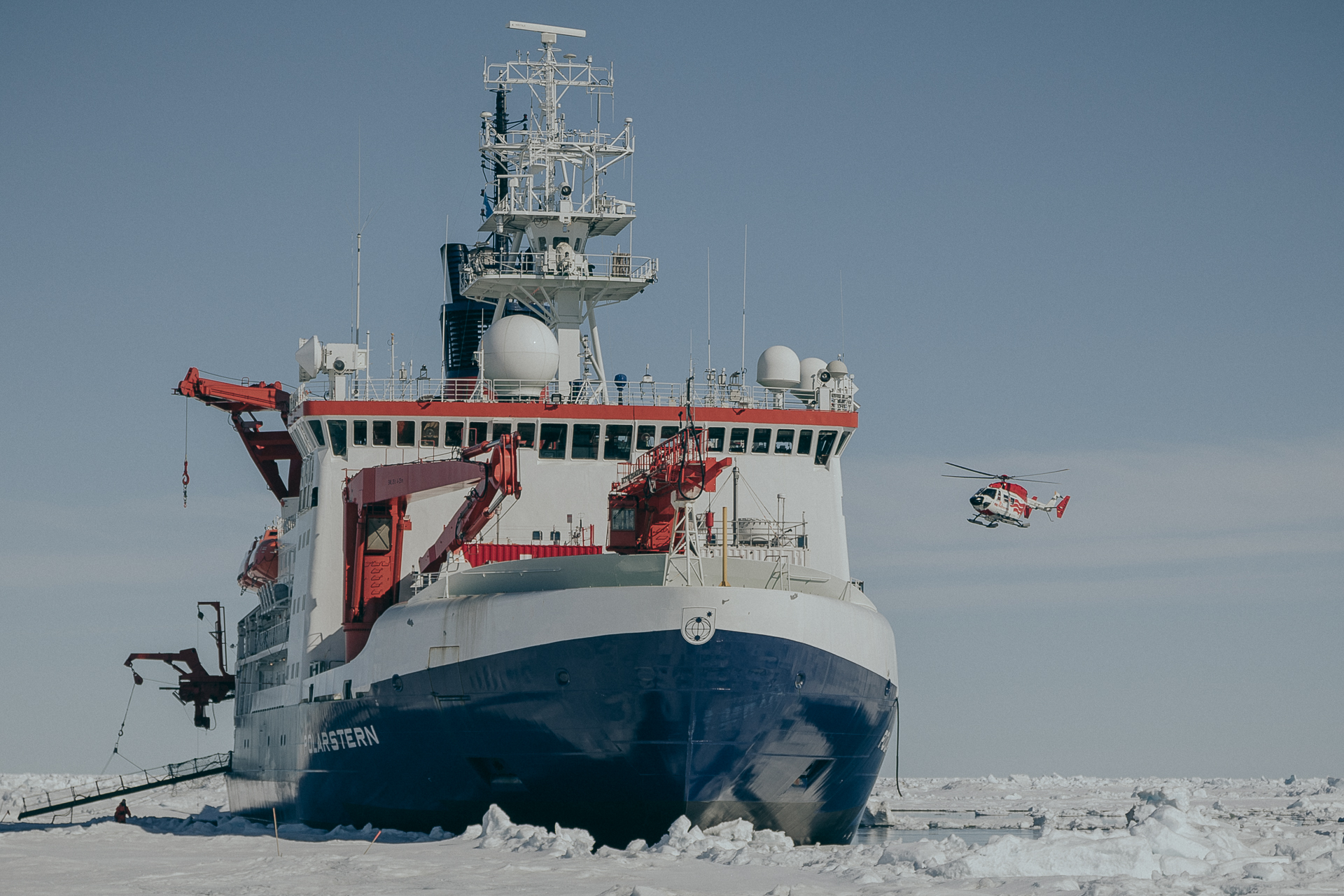
Polarstern during MOSAiC expedition

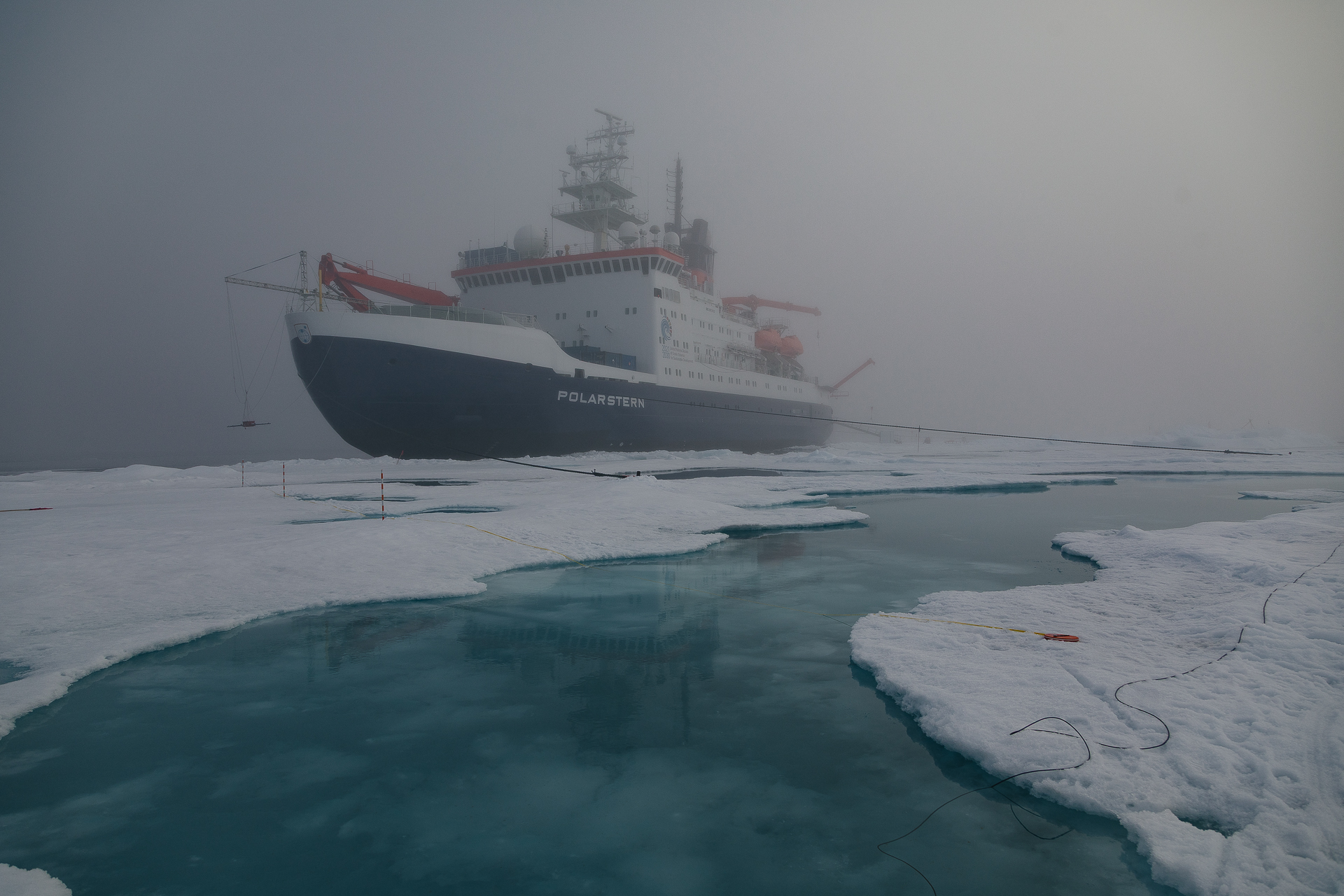
Polarstern during CONTRASTS expedition
