= Pressure ridge (ice) =

Linear accumulation of ice blocks resulting from the convergence between floes

Hypothetical interaction between two floes, resulting in a pressure ridge —— a linear pile-up of sea ice fragments.

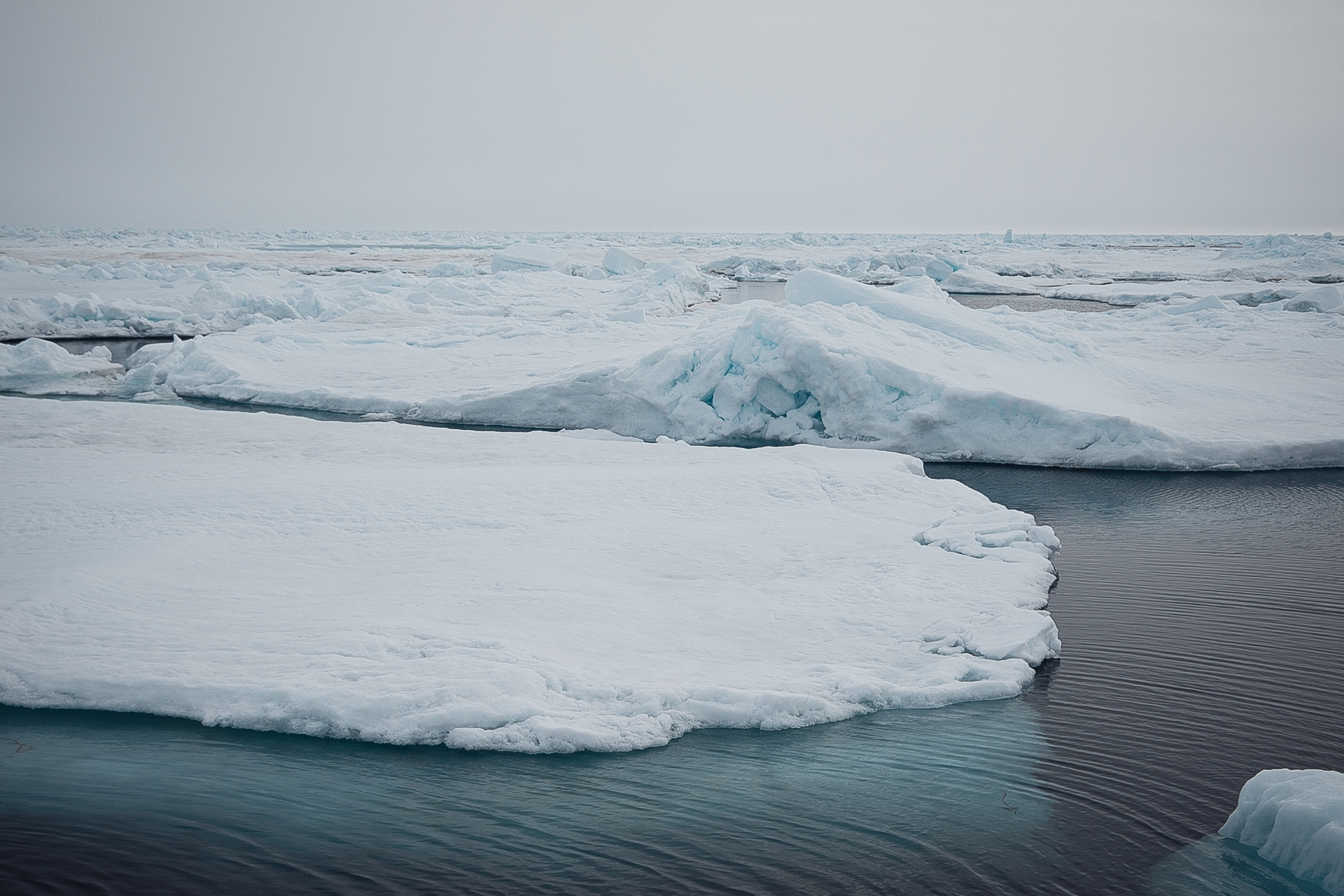
Internal structure of a first-year ice ridge with a 2 m sail height, MOSAiC expedition, July 4, 2020.

A pressure ridge is a linear pile-up of sea ice fragments formed in pack ice by accumulation in the convergence between floes in an oceanic or coastal environment.

Such a pressure ridge develops in an ice cover as a result of a stress regime established within the plane of the ice. Within sea ice expanses, pressure ridges originate from the interaction between floes, (Note: A floe is any individual piece of sea ice larger than 20 m (66 ft).) as they collide with each other. Currents and winds are the main driving forces, but the latter is particularly effective when they have a predominant direction. Pressure ridges are made up of angular ice blocks of various sizes that pile up on the floes. The part of the ridge that is above the water surface is known as the sail; that below it as the keel. (Note: These terms also apply to any floating ice feature, such as icebergs.) Pressure ridges are the thickest sea ice features and account for up to 30–40% of the total sea ice area and about one-half of the total sea ice volume. Stamukhi are pressure ridges that are grounded and that result from the interaction between fast ice and the drifting pack ice. Similar to undeformed ice, pressure ridges can be first-, second-, and multiyear depending on how many melt seasons they managed to survive. Ridges can be formed from ice of different ages, but mostly consist of 20–40 cm thick blocks of thin and young ice.

== Spatial coverage and seasonal evolution ==
Ridges are distributed unevenly within the Arctic Ocean. Ridge concentration is the highest close to the Northern coast of Greenland and Canada. Ridge concentration can be estimated using satellite laser altimeters, while the most accurate measurements of ridge topography are obtained from airborne and submarine surveys, as well as from ocean moorings. Ridge concentration in the North of Greenland showed a substantial decrease between 1993 and 2023, with 12–15% fewer ridges per decade. A typical distance between two adjacent ridges is around 100–200 meters. Ridges in areas with thicker ice typically have a higher concentration and larger depth.

== Internal structure ==
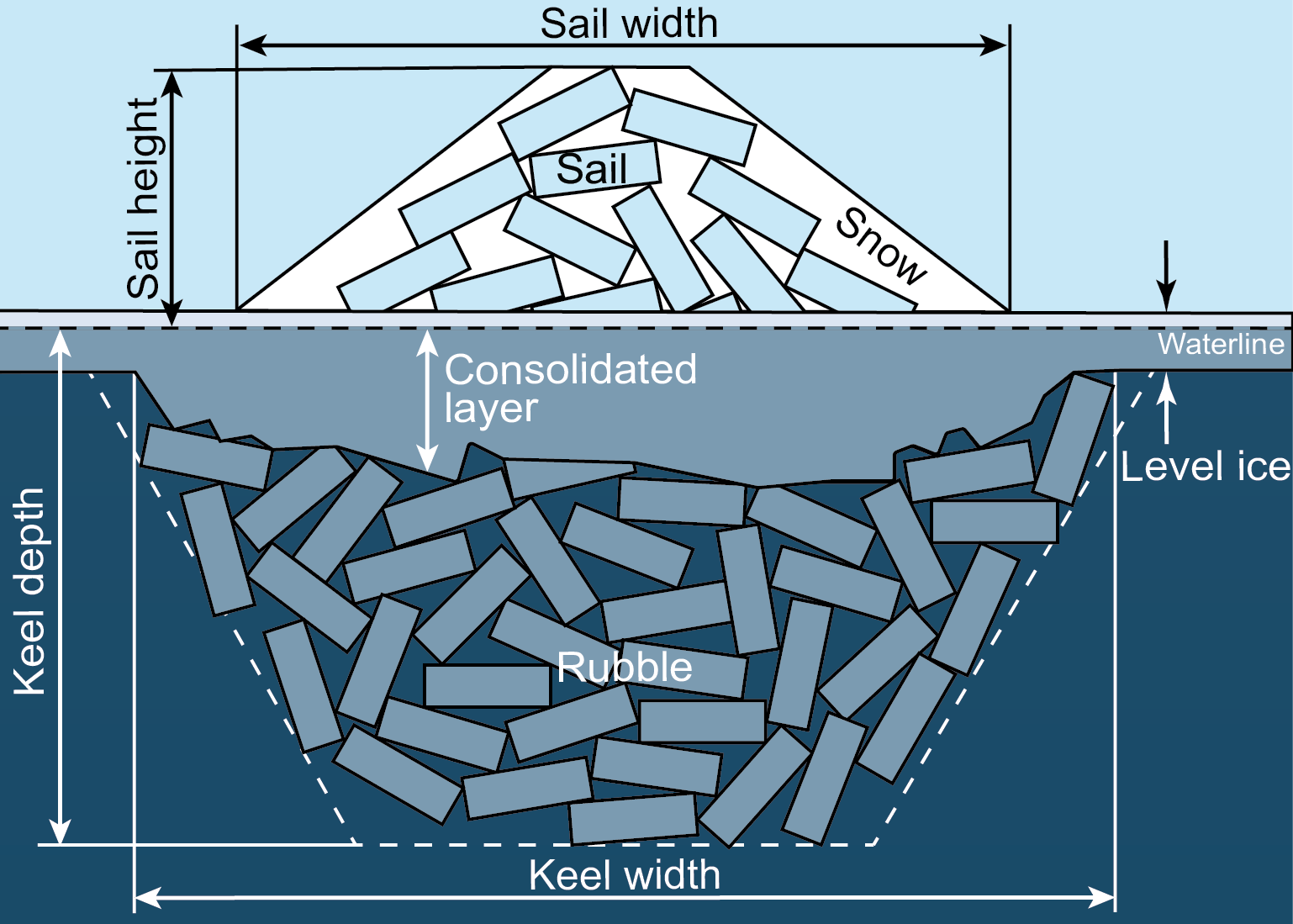
Schematic cross-section of a sea ice pressure ridge, showing the sail above the waterline and the keel below. The ridge consists of broken ice blocks (rubble) and a consolidated layer, with level ice on either side.

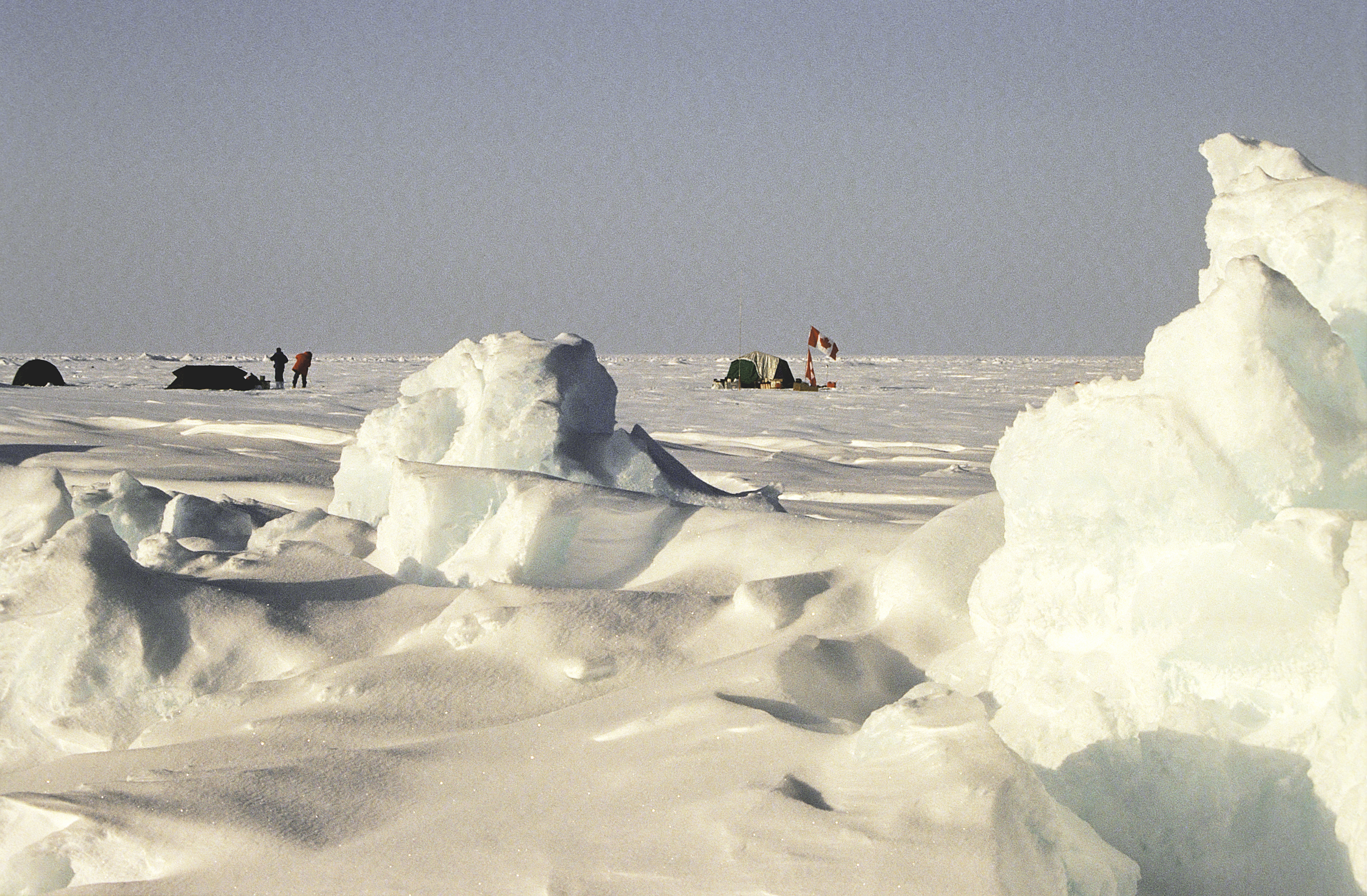
Pressure ridge at North Pole, expedition of University of Giessen, April 17, 1990

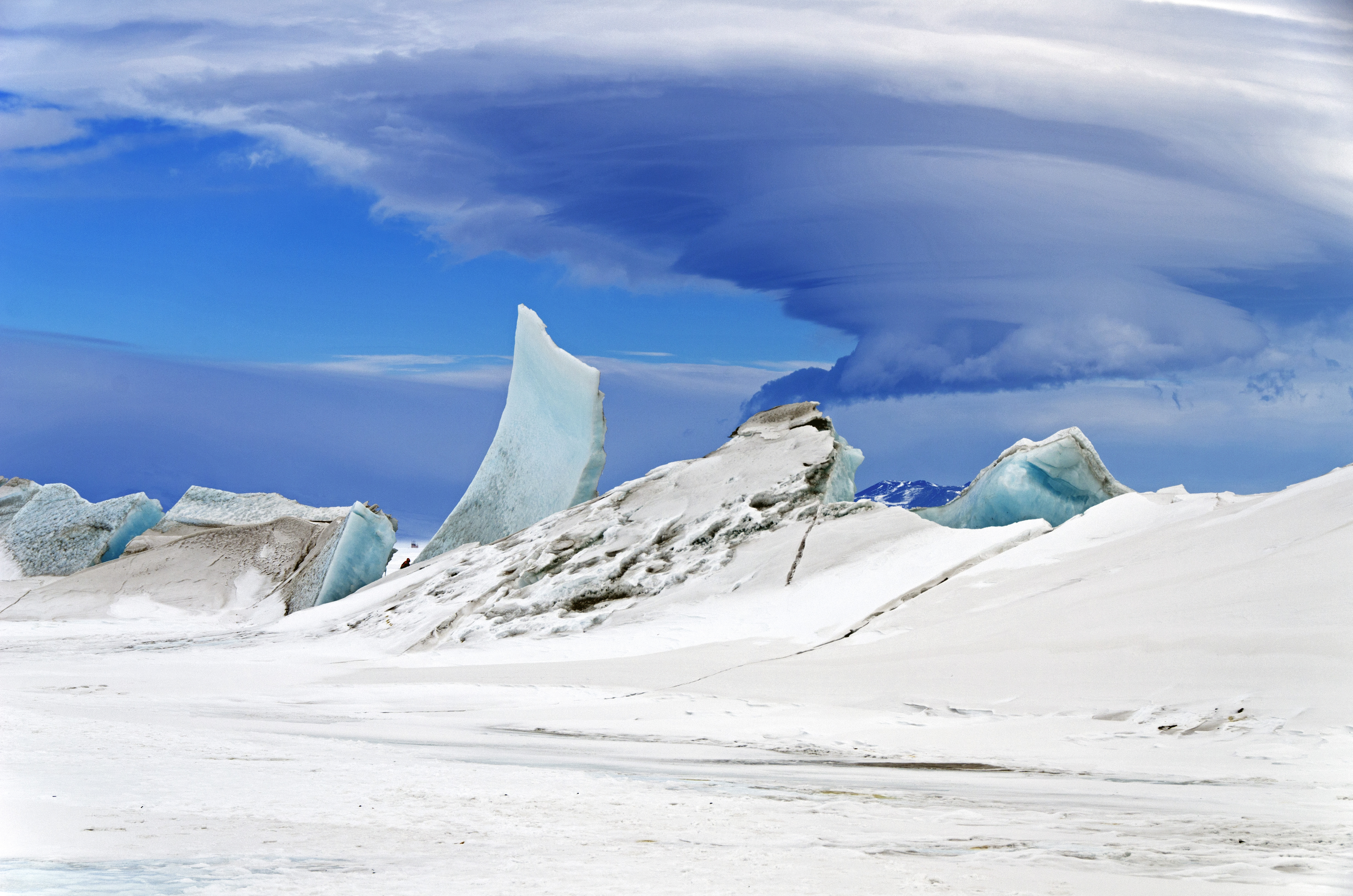
A pressure ridge in the Antarctic ice near Scott Base, with lenticular clouds in the sky.

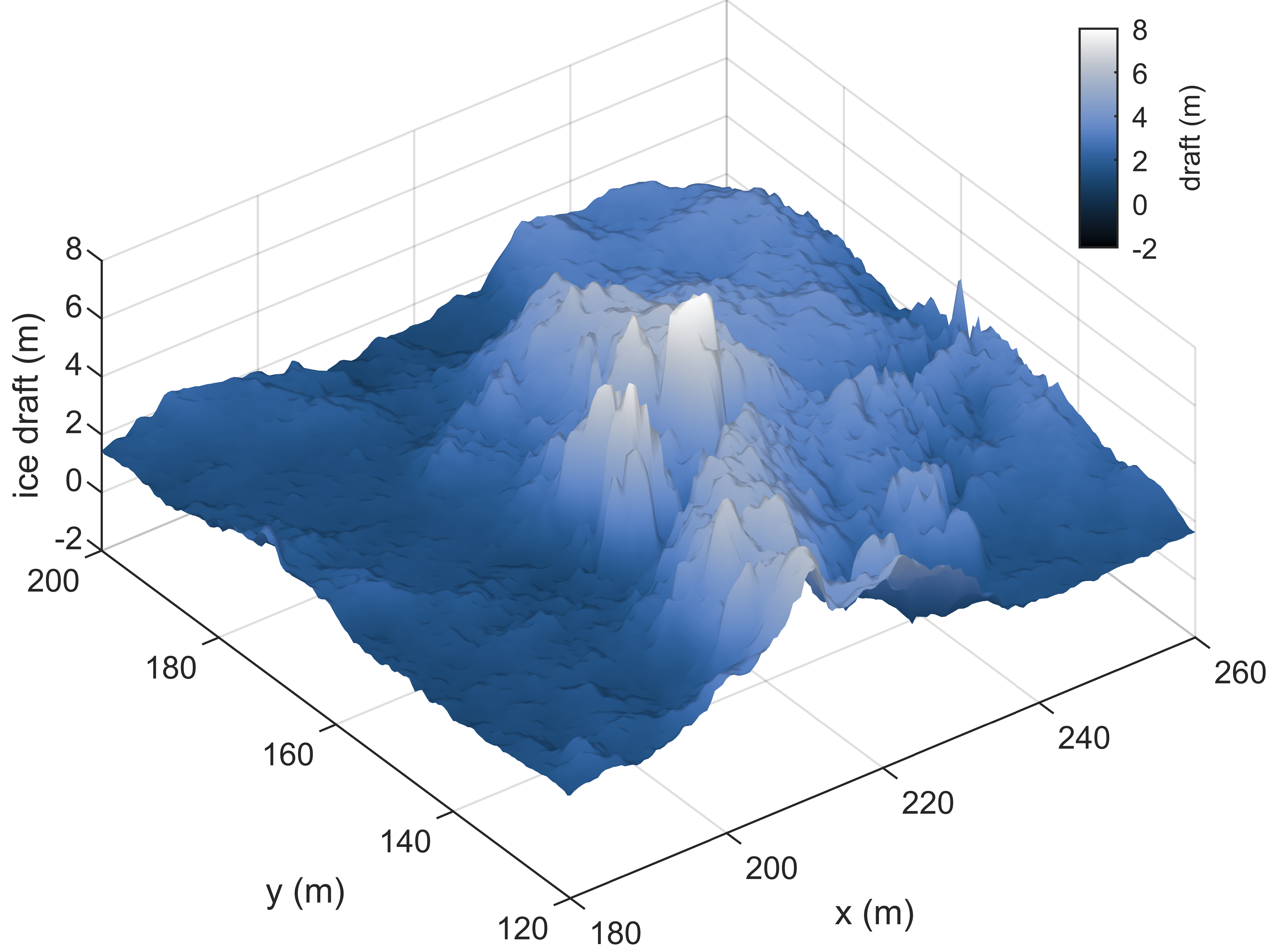
Bottom topography of a first-year pressure ridge measured using underwater multibeam sonar during MOSAiC Expedition.

The blocks making up pressure ridges are mostly from the thinner ice floe involved in the interaction, but they can also include pieces from the other floe if it is not too thick. In the summer, the ridge can undergo a significant amount of weathering, which turns it into a smooth hill. During this process, the ice loses its salinity (as a result of brine drainage and meltwater flushing). This is known as an aged ridge. A fully consolidated ridge is one whose base has undergone complete freezing. The term consolidated layer is used to designate the freezing up of the rubble just below the water line. The existence of a consolidated layer depends on air temperature — in this layer, the water between individual blocks is frozen, with a resulting reduction in porosity and an increase in mechanical strength. A keel's depth of an ice ridge is much higher than its sail's height — typically about 3–5 times. The keel is also 2–3 times wider than the sail. Ridges are usually melting faster than level ice, both at the surface and at the bottom. While first-year ridges melt approximately 4 times faster than surrounding level ice, second-year ridges melt only 1.6 times faster than surrounding level ice. Sea-ice ridges also play an important role in confining meltwater within under-ice meltwater layers, which may lead to the formation of false bottoms. Ridges also play an important role in controlling the values of atmospheric drag coefficients.

== Thickness and consolidation ==
One of the largest pressure ridges on record had a sail extending 12 m above the water surface, and a keel depth of 45 m. The total thickness for a multiyear ridge was reported to be 40 m. On average, total thickness ranges between 5 m and 30 m, with a mean sail height that remains below 2 m. The average keel depth of Arctic ridges is 4.5 m. The sail height is usually proportional to the square root of the ridge block thickness. Ice ridges in Fram Strait usually have a trapezoidal shape with a bottom horizontal section covering around 17% of the total ridge width and with a mean draft of 7 m, while ice ridges in the Chukchi and Beaufort Seas have a concave close to triangular shape.

The average consolidated layer thickness of Arctic ridges is 1.6 m. Usually, ridges consolidate faster than level ice because of their initial macroporosity. Ridge rubble porosity (or water-filled void fraction of ridge unconsolidated part) is in the wide range of 10–40%. During winter, ice ridges consolidate up to two times faster than level ice, with the ratio of level ice and consolidated layer thickness proportional to the square root of ridge rubble porosity. This results in 1.6–1.8 ratio of consolidated layer and level ice thickness by the end of winter season. Meanwhile, snow is usually about three times thicker above ridges than above level ice. Sometimes ridges can be found fully consolidated with the total thickness up to 8 m. Ridges may also contain from 6% to 11% of snow mass fraction, which can be potentially linked to the mechanisms of ridge consolidation. Fram Strait ridge observations suggest, that the largest part of ridge consolidation happens during the spring season when during warm air intrusions or dynamic events snow can enter ridge keels via open leads and increase the speed of ridge consolidation. These observations are supported by high snow mass fraction in refrozen leads, observed during the spring season. The ridge consolidation potentially reduces light levels and the habitable space available for organisms, which may have negative ecological impacts as ridges have been identified as ecological hotspots.

== Characterization methods ==
The physical characterization of pressure ridges can be done using the following methods:

- Mechanical drilling of the ice with non-coring or coring augers (when the ice core is retrieved for analysis).
- Surveying, whereby a level, theodolite or a differential GPS system is used to determine sail geometry.
- Thermal drilling — drilling involving melting of the ice.
- Observation of the ice canopy by scuba divers.
- Upward looking sonars and multibeam sonars fixed on seabed or mounted on a submarine or remotely operated underwater vehicle.
- A series of thermistors (ice mass balance buoy), to monitor temperature changes.
- Electromagnetic induction, from the ice surface or from an aircraft.
- Satellite (ICESat‐2) and airborne laser altimeters to measure surface topography and ridge spacing.

== Interest for pressure ridges ==
From an offshore engineering and naval perspective, there are three reasons why pressure ridges are a subject of investigation. Firstly, the highest loads applied on offshore structures operating in cold oceans by drift ice are associated with these features. Secondly, when pressure ridges drift into shallower areas, their keel may come into contact with the seabed, thereby representing a risk for subsea pipelines (see Seabed gouging by ice) and other seabed installations. Thirdly, they have a significant impact on navigation. In the Arctic, ridged ice makes up about 40% of the overall mass of sea ice. First-year ridges with large macroporosity are important for the ice-associated sympagic communities and identified as potential ecological hotspots and proposed to serve as refugia of ice-associated organisms.

== See also ==
- Finger rafting
- Iceberg
- Ice volcano
- Offshore geotechnical engineering
