= Icebreakers of Germany =

The icebreakers of Germany include one large icebreaker, used for International polar research and dozens of smaller icebreakers that clear navigation channels of ice in Germany's territorial waters.

name	IMO / ENI number	launched	notes
Polarstern	IMO 8013132	1982	a German research icebreaker of the Alfred Wegener Institute for Polar and Marine Research in Bremerhaven.
Mellum	IMO 8301981	1983	Multi-purpose vessel with icebreaking capabilities
Neuwerk	IMO 9143984	1997	Multi-purpose vessel with icebreaking capabilities
Arkona		2004	Multi-purpose vessel with icebreaking capabilities
Görmitz	IMO 9339363	2004	in 2010 she assisted in the northern Peenestrom, in the fairway to Hiddensee and Ost- and Landtief
Schwedt	ENI 05041960	2010	Breaks ice on the River Oder
Stettin		1933	Steamship, now a museum ship
Eisbrecher I		1871	One of the first European icebreakers
Eisbrecher II		1877	
Eisbrecher III		1892	
Eisvogel		1960	a 500-ton naval icebreaker, since 2010 Italian tugboat
Eisbär		1961	a 500-ton naval icebreaker, scrapped in late 1990s
Kienitz	ENI 05027290	1958	Breaks ice on the River Oder
Hanse		1965	Built in Finland, paid off in 1998 and lost after major fire
Stephan Jantzen		1967	Dobrynya Nikitich-class icebreaker built in Russia for East Germany, replaced by the Arkona in 2004
Max Waldeck		1967	subjected to an experimental conversion in 1983
Hindenburg		1915	sunk by a mine 1918.
Kietz	ENI 05041970	2010	Breaks ice on the River Oder
Keiler		2011	Operated by the Wasser und Schifffahrtsamt
Frankfurt	ENI 05039960	2002	constructed by Hitzler Werft for icebreaking duties on the Elbe River, Oder River, and canals in the former East Germany, operated by the Wasser und Schifffahrtsamt
Steinbock		1935	Operated by the Wasser und Schifffahrtsamt
Widder		1949	Operated by the Wasser und Schifffahrtsamt
Stier		1951	Operated by the Wasser und Schifffahrtsamt
Freiburg	ENI 05042180	2012	Operated by the Wasser und Schifffahrtsamt on the Rhine River; working vessel.
Eisvogel		1942	Operated by the Kriegsmarine and later Soviet Navy. Decommissioned in 1972.
Eisbär		1942	Operated by the Kriegsmarine and later Soviet Navy. Decommissioned in 1979.
Castor		1941	Operated by the Kriegsmarine. Sunk in 1945 but later raised by the Soviet Union.
Pollux		1943	Operated by the Kriegsmarine. Sunk in 1945.
Maria S. Merian		2006	Research Vessel for IOW in Rostock.

== See also ==
- List of icebreakers
