= Eisvogel =

Eisvogel or Eisvögel (German: Kingfisher) may refer to:

- Eisvogel (1942 icebreaker), served in the Kriegsmarine during WWII, later served in Russia until 1972
- Eisvogel (1955 icebreaker), operating in the Port of Vienna
- Eisvogel-class icebreaker, two ships built for the German Navy
  - Eisvogel (1960 icebreaker), lead Eisvogel-class icebreaker
- Eisvögel USC Freiburg, a German women's professional basketball team
