= Keiler (disambiguation) =

Keiler is a German river icebreaker.

Keiler may also refer to:

== People ==
- Keiler García (born 1990), Cuban footballer
- Barbara Keiler (born 1953), American author
- Roland Kaiser (born Roland Keiler in 1952), schlager singer-songwriter from Germany

== Other uses ==
- Keiler (mine flail), a mine-clearing vehicle

== See also ==
- Garrison Keillor
