= Isle of Wight (disambiguation) =

The Isle of Wight is an island and ceremonial county in England.

Isle of Wight may also refer to:

== Places ==
=== England ===
- Isle of Wight (UK Parliament constituency)
- Isle of Wight, a group of dwellings within Bookham Commons, Surrey
- Isle of Wight Council, which covers a unitary authority region
- Isle of Wight Rural District, a rural district from 1894 to 1974

=== United States ===
- Isle of Wight (Maryland)
- Isle of Wight, the original name of Gardiners Island, New York
- Isle of Wight County, Virginia
  - Isle of Wight, Virginia, an unincorporated community

== Music ==
- Isle of Wight (album), a 1971 Jimi Hendrix album
- Isle of Wight Festival, an annual music festival on the main Isle of Wight, in England
- Alternate title for the hymn "Alas! and Did My Saviour Bleed"

== See also ==
- IOW (disambiguation)
