= RV Maria S. Merian =

German research vessel

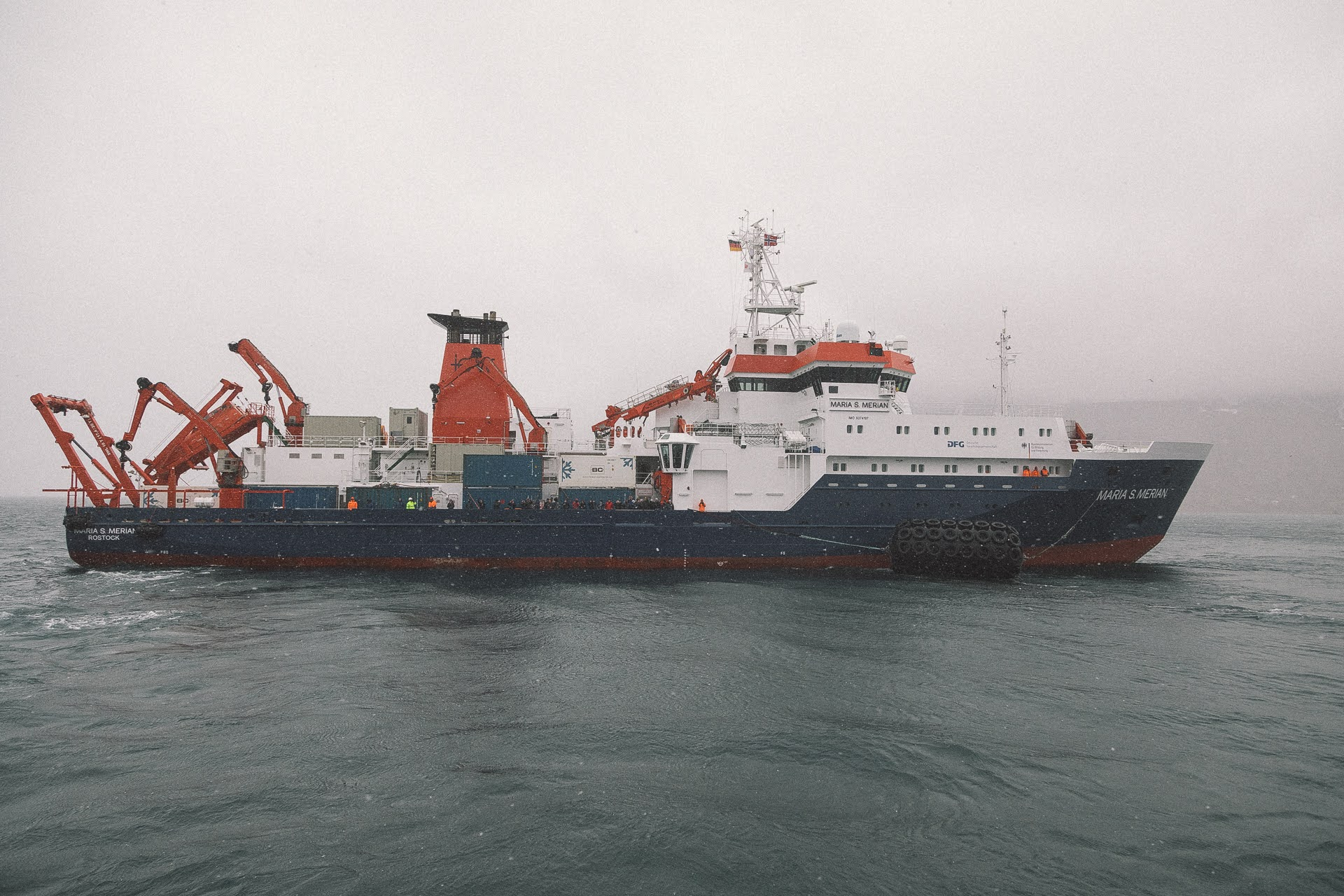
- Departing Isfjorden (Svalbard), in June 2020 during MOSAiC Expedition

History
- Name: RV Maria S. Merian
- Operator: Leibniz Institute for Baltic Sea Research
- Port of registry: Rostock, Germany
- Builder: Maritim Ltd., Gdańsk, Poland; Kröger Werft, Schacht-Audorf, Germany
- Laid down: June 2003
- Launched: July 2005
- Christened: 26 July 2005
- In service: 9 February 2006
- Identification: IMO number: 9274197; Call sign: DBBT; MMSI number: 211753000
- Status: Active

General characteristics
- Class & type: Research vessel
- Length: 94.80 m (311 ft 0 in)
- Beam: 19.20 m (63 ft 0 in)
- Draft: 6.50 m (21 ft 4 in)
- Ice class: + 100 A5 E3
- Propulsion: 2 × 1,900 kW pod, 1 × 1,600 kW jet
- Speed: 15.0 knots (27.8 km/h)
- Capacity: 1,345 tonnes
- Crew: 24 crew + 22 scientists
- Sensors & processing systems: Multi-beam echo sounder, sub-bottom-profiler, ADCP, meteorological sensors

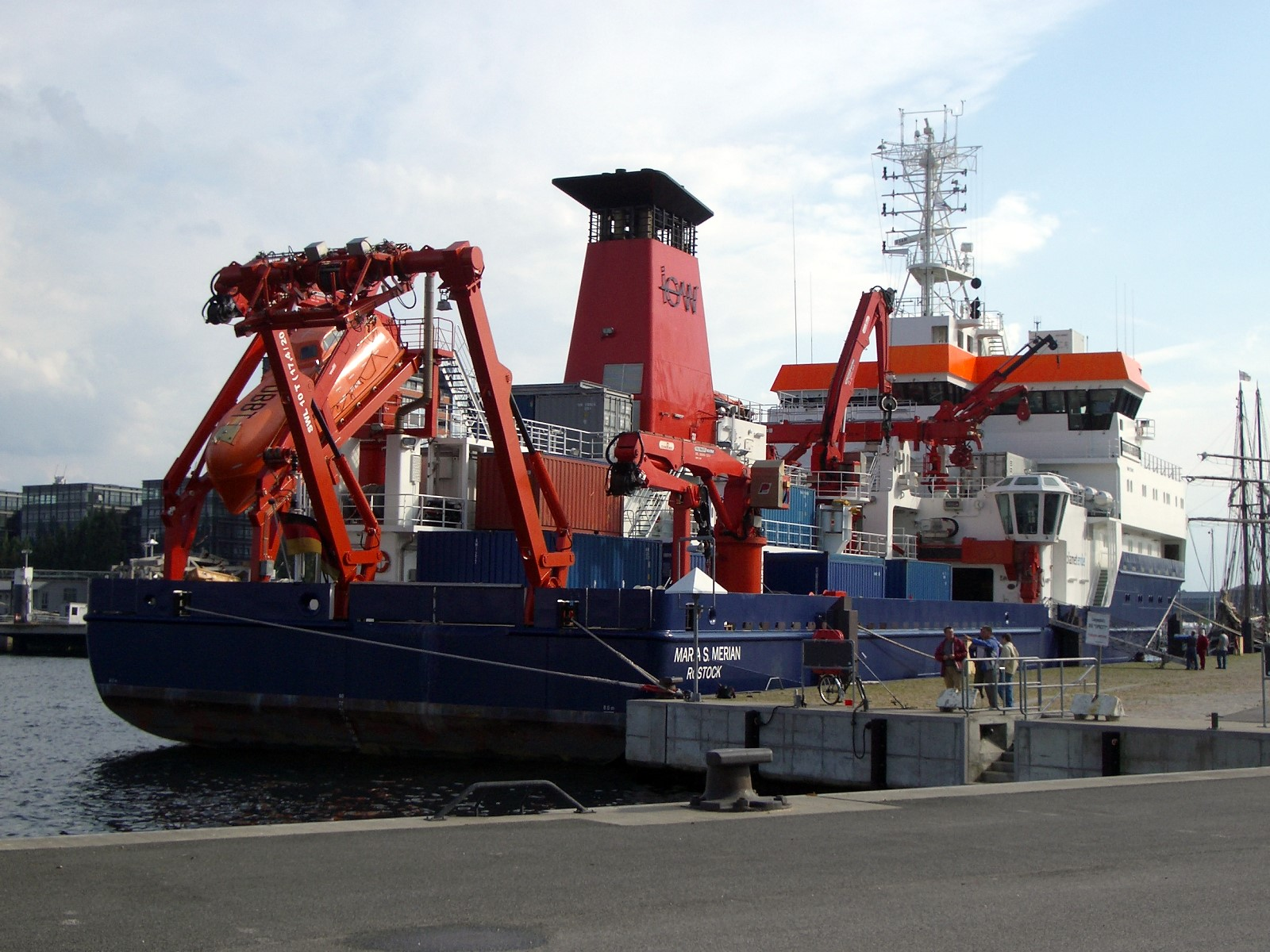
RV Maria S. Merian

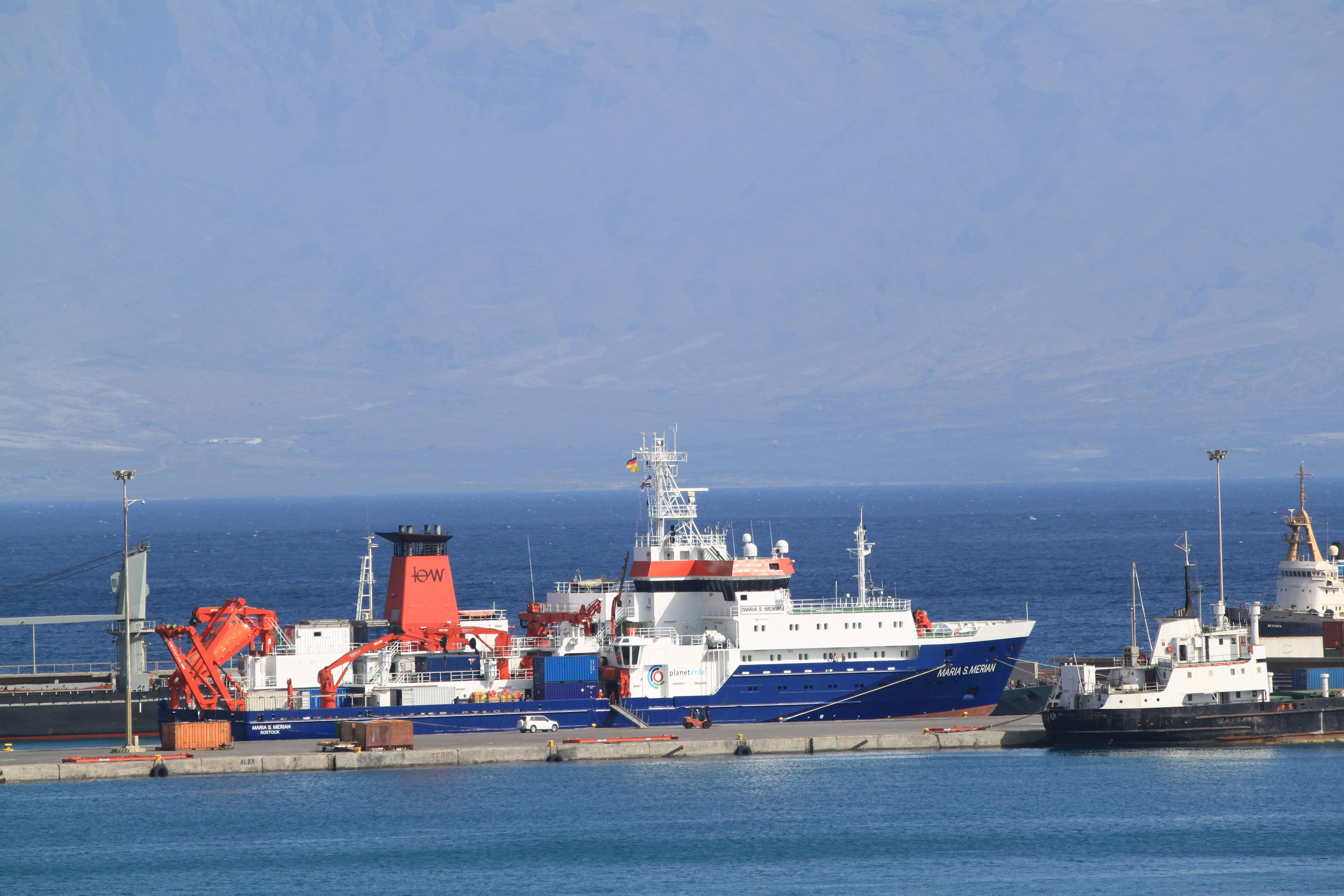
RV Maria S. Merian in the harbour of Mindelo, Cape Verde.

RV Maria S. Merian is Germany's second most modern research vessel, named after the naturalist and illustrator Maria Sybilla Merian. As of March 2006, Germany operates three other research vessels of its class, none of which is as well-equipped.

The Merian was financed by the German government and is assigned to the Leibniz Institute for Baltic Sea Research at Warnemünde, with Rostock as its home port. It is also available to several other German research institutes. Its tasks are Arctic research, research on the Gulf Stream, and seabed research to a depth of 10 km. It is crewed by a complement of 21, and can additionally accommodate 22 scientists. The vessel is equipped with several laboratories. It has room for 150 tonnes of additional scientific equipment in accessible containers, providing flexibility in research assignments.

The ship is equipped with two azimuth thrusters, a lateral pump-jet, and satellite navigation, enabling it to automatically maintain an exact position. It can operate without any polluting emissions for 48 hours (apart from the normal engine exhaust), allowing it to conduct research in ecologically sensitive areas. The Merian is capable of operating in near-polar regions and can handle drift ice up to a thickness of 80 cm. It is 94.80 m long, 19.20 m wide, and has a maximum draft of 6.50 m. Flank speed is 15 knots (28 km/h), and range is up to 7,500 nautical miles (13,900 km) and 35 days.

The Merian's keel was laid in June 2003 at the Maritim Ltd. wharf in Gdańsk, Poland, which belongs to the German Kröger Werft company. Construction was completed at Schacht-Audorf, Germany, and the ship was named and launched in July 2005. The vessel set course for intensive tests in the Bay of Biscay in September 2005, and in February 2006 it was handed over to the Warnemünde-based institute. Its first research assignment took it to the Baltic Sea in early 2006.
