= Eisbär (icebreaker) =

A number of icebreakers have been named Eisbär, German for "polar bear":

- Eisbär, a 1942-built icebreaker hander over to the Soviet Union as war reparations in 1946
- Eisbär, an Eisvogel-class icebreaker built in 1969 and decommissioned in 1997
