= Markus Rex =

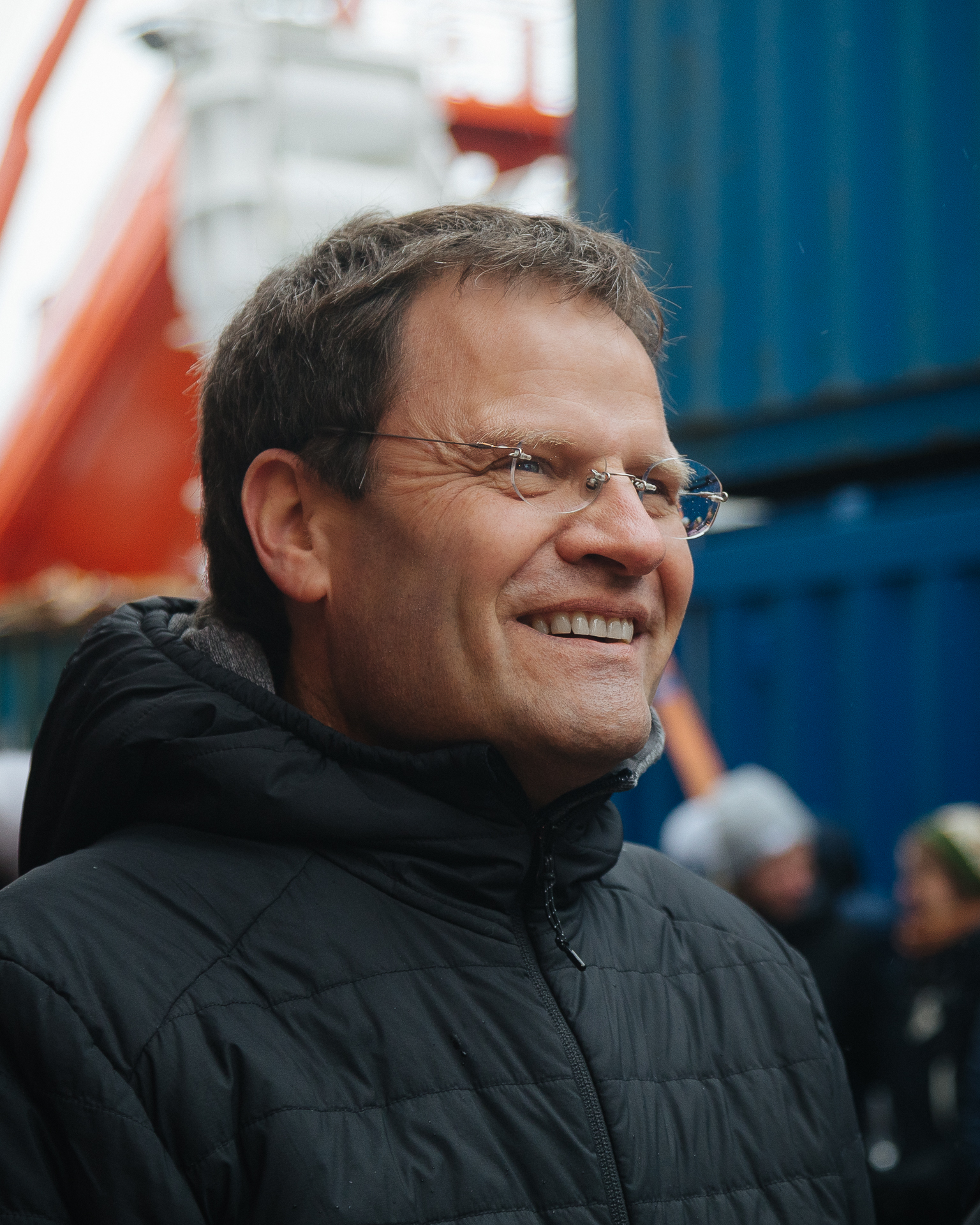
- Rex aboard Polarstern during the MOSAiC expedition
- Born: November 28, 1966 (age 59); Braunschweig, Lower Saxony, West Germany
- Education: Technical University of Braunschweig; University of Göttingen; Free University of Berlin; University of Bremen
- Known for: MOSAiC Expedition
- Awards: NOMIS Award (2025)
- Scientific career
- Fields: Climate science, polar research, atmospheric physics
- Workplaces: Alfred Wegener Institute; University of Potsdam; Jet Propulsion Laboratory; University of Canterbury
- Thesis: Ozone Depletion in the Arctic Stratosphere: Results of a New Measurement Strategy (Match) (1997)
- Doctoral advisor: Karin Labitzke; Steven Pawson

Markus Rex (born 28 November 1966 in Braunschweig, Germany) is a German polar researcher, climate scientist, physicist, and author. His research focuses on atmospheric physics, polar climate processes, ozone depletion, and interactions between the atmosphere and sea ice. He is best known for leading the MOSAiC expedition (2019–2020), the largest international Arctic research expedition to date. He is a professor at the University of Potsdam and serves as head of the Atmospheric Physics Section at the Alfred Wegener Institute (AWI).

== Career ==
Markus Rex was born in Braunschweig, as was his sister Gundula, to Dietrich Rex, a professor of space engineering, and Ursula Rex (née Schiller). After completing his secondary education at the Raabeschule in Braunschweig in 1986, he studied physics, geophysics, and meteorology at the Technical University of Braunschweig. He later continued his studies in Göttingen and completed his diploma thesis in 1992 using data from an Arctic research project. The thesis, titled Stratospheric Ozone Depletion Rates Derived from Ozone Sounding Data of the EASOE Campaign, marked the beginning of his research on the polar ozone hole.

Rex earned his Ph.D. from the Free University of Berlin in 1997 under the supervision of Karin Labitzke and Steven Pawson. His dissertation was titled Ozone Depletion in the Arctic Stratosphere: Results of a New Measurement Strategy (Match) (German: Der Ozonabbau in der arktischen Stratosphäre: Ergebnisse einer neuen Meßstrategie (Match)). In 2013, he completed his habilitation at the University of Bremen with a thesis on the variability and change of the polar ozone layer and their significance within the climate system. From 2001 to 2004, Rex led the BMBF-funded junior research group DYCHO (Dynamics and Chemistry of the Ozone Layer in a Changing Atmosphere), which investigated the effects of dynamical and chemical processes on the ozone layer.

Rex worked at NASA's Jet Propulsion Laboratory (JPL) at the California Institute of Technology in the United States, at the Alfred Wegener Institute, and at the University of Canterbury in New Zealand. He also served as a lecturer at the Free University of Berlin and the University of Bremen.

In October 2016, Rex was appointed professor at the University of Potsdam and succeeded Klaus Dethloff as head of the Alfred Wegener Institute's Atmospheric Physics Section, which had previously been known as the Section for Atmospheric Circulation and Trace Constituents.

In 2025, Rex received the NOMIS Award for groundbreaking interdisciplinary research. The award recognized, among other achievements, his leadership of the MOSAiC expedition (2019–2020), the largest international Arctic research expedition to date. He announced that the prize funding would support the development of the AI-based research project Deepcloud, which aims to improve understanding of cloud feedback processes in the polar climate system. Rex is actively involved in science communication and is the author of the Der Spiegel bestseller Frozen at the North Pole.

== Research ==
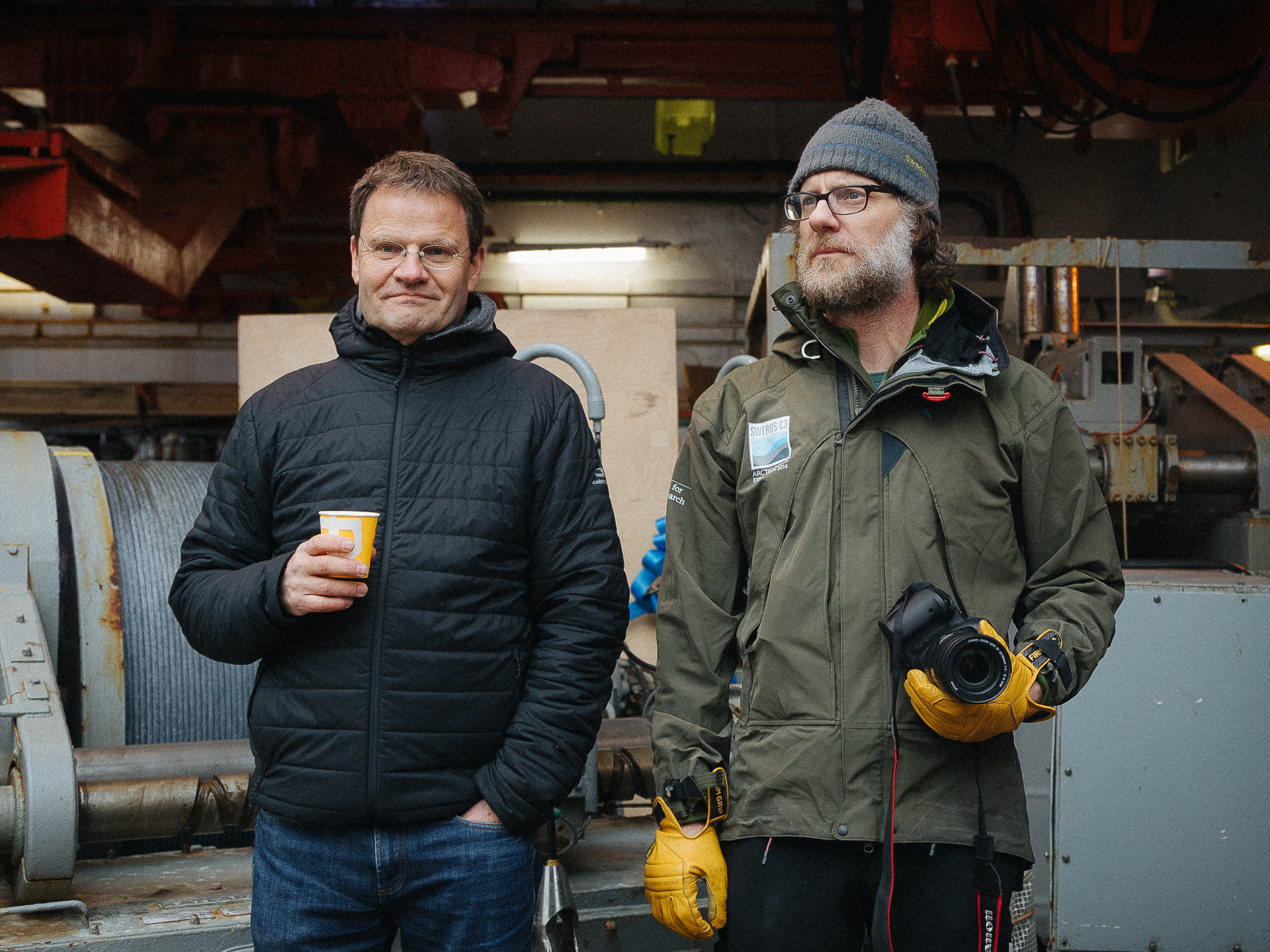
Markus Rex (expedition leader) and Matthew Shupe (co‑leader) aboard the research icebreaker Polarstern during the MOSAiC expedition.

Rex's research has focused on atmospheric chemistry, Arctic ozone depletion, and climate processes in polar regions. In 1997, Rex was the first author of a Nature study reporting the highest recorded chemical ozone loss in the Arctic at that time and identifying mechanisms that allowed ozone depletion to persist well into spring. The findings contributed to understanding the conditions that can lead to severe Arctic ozone loss. In 2004, Rex and colleagues provided the first empirical quantification of the relationship between Arctic ozone loss and stratospheric climate change, showing that cooling of the Arctic lower stratosphere substantially increases ozone depletion and suggesting that severe ozone losses observed during the 1990s resulted from both anthropogenic halogens and long-term changes in Arctic stratospheric climate.

Rex and colleagues also developed the SWIFT (Semi-empirical Weighted Iterative Fit Technique) ozone chemistry module, a computationally efficient version of the ATLAS model designed for coupling ozone chemistry to climate models.

In 2014, Rex and colleagues reported the discovery of a large region over the tropical western Pacific with unusually low atmospheric oxidation capacity, suggesting a previously unrecognized pathway for the transport of pollutants into the stratosphere.

From 2019 to 2020, Rex, together with his two deputies, Klaus Dethloff and Matthew Shupe, led the international research project MOSAiC (Multidisciplinary drifting Observatory for the Study of Arctic Climate), a year-long Arctic expedition that investigated the impacts of climate change. The expedition involved hundreds of scientists from numerous countries and represented the largest international Arctic research expedition to date. During the mission, the research icebreaker Polarstern drifted with Arctic sea ice for a full year to collect observations of the Arctic climate system.

== Awards and honors ==
- 1999 – Ernst‑Reuter‑Preis of Freie Universität Berlin for his doctoral dissertation on atmospheric physics.
- 2004 – Dobson Award of the International Ozone Commission (IOC) for his research on Arctic ozone depletion, including his publication “On the unexplained stratospheric ozone losses during cold Arctic Januaries”.
- 2019 – Included in Nature's "Ones to Watch in 2020" list for leadership of the MOSAiC expedition.
- 2022 – Arctic Circle Prize, awarded to the Alfred Wegener Institute and the MOSAiC Expedition, which was led by Markus Rex, in recognition of their contribution to advancing understanding of Arctic climate change.
- 2024 – IASC Award for Service from the International Arctic Science Committee (IASC) for his contributions to Arctic research and leadership within the MOSAiC project.
- 2025 – NOMIS Distinguished Scientist and Scholar Award for his project *Deepcloud*, which develops new AI‑based approaches to model cloud processes and improve understanding of Arctic cloud feedbacks in a warming climate.
