= Atlantic Data Base for Exchange Processes at the Deep Sea Floor =

The Atlantic Data Base for Exchange Processes at the Deep Sea Floor (ADEPD) was a marine research project funded by the EU from 1998 to 2000 as part of MAST III (Marine Science and Technology Programme). The project was coordinated by Prof. Dr. Karin Lochte at the Leibniz Institute for Baltic Sea Research, Warnemünde with contributions of ten European partners and one institute from the US.

The aim of the ADEPD project was to build up a joint data base for deep sea biological and geochemical data from a variety of sources and to conduct a preliminary geographical analysis of these data. Emphasis was on the North Atlantic, since from this area most data are available and it is the most perturbed deep sea region due to human activities. 1775 published and unpublished data sets were collected in two years. This was the first project which has compiled a data base from existing deep sea data, long-term archived and accessible to the scientific community.

Evaluation of the data collection showed that data are clustered in some well investigated areas of the Atlantic, but large regions are devoid of data like the Mid Atlantic Ridge, parts of the South Atlantic and Southern Ocean. In particular biological data from the deep sea are much more scarce than geochemical ones, since many biological data from past investigations are not accessible in a suitable form at present. Most deep sea research projects did not carry out geochemical and biological studies at the same locations. Therefore, statistical comparisons between biological and geochemical data are still difficult despite the high total amount of data gathered. Different methods employed for the determination of one variable further complicate the matter. One of the major achievements of ADEP was to convert different measurements to common units. This allowed to investigate relationships between different chemical measurements, groups of organisms and turnover rates.

Two very different approaches to estimate the total turnover of organic carbon or oxygen (respiration) at the deep sea floor gave very similar results. Regional differences in both assessments point to methodological shortcomings by one or the other method and to gaps in data coverage. While estimates agreed well in central Atlantic regions, fairly large discrepancies were found at the continental margins. This indicated that there was still insufficient knowledge about transport processes and biological turnover of organic carbon along continental margins.

The following recommendations for future research were given on the basis of the ADEPD results:

- It is most important to secure deep sea biological data from so far inaccessible sources and to collate them in a data information system which guarantees long-term stewardship and public access.
- Biological and geochemical studies were mostly carried out separately which seems to be a systematic, scientific pattern and poses a problem in deep sea research. Interdisciplinary studies are essential to better understand of deep sea processes.
- The largest differences in estimates of oxygen fluxes at the sea floor are found at continental margins which export large amounts of organic carbon to the deep sea. The knowledge of transport and biological utilization at the continental margins need further attention.

== Participating institutes ==
- Leibniz Institute for Baltic Sea Research, Warnemünde, Germany
- Alfred Wegenr Institute for Polar and Marine Research, Bremerhaven, Germany
- Centre des Faibles Radioactivites Gif-sur-Yvette, France
- Dunstaffnage Marine Laboratory Oban, United Kingdom
- Department of Geosciences, University of Bremen, Germany
- Leibniz-Institute of Marine Sciences, Kiel, Germany
- IFREMER Centre de Brest, France
- Max Planck Institute for Marine Microbiology, Bremen, Germany
- Netherlands Institute for Sea Research, The Netherlands
- P.P. Shirshov Institute of Oceanology Moscow, Russia
- Skidaway Institute of Oceanography, USA
