= Lechte =

Lechte is a surname. Notable people with the surname include:

- John Lechte (1921–2002), Australian politician
- Robert Lechte (born 1978), Swedish handball player
- Ulrich Lechte (born 1977), German politician

== See also ==
- Lochte
