= Eisvogel (1955 icebreaker) =

Icebreaker boat in the Port of Vienna, Austria

History

Austria
- Name: Eisvogel
- Owner: Port of Vienna
- In service: 1955
- Identification: MMSI number: 203999348; Callsign: OED2020
- Status: in active service, as of 2012

General characteristics
- Type: Icebreaker
- Tonnage: 80 tons
- Length: 32 m (105 ft)
- Beam: 6.5 m (21 ft)
- Propulsion: 382 kW (520 PS) engines

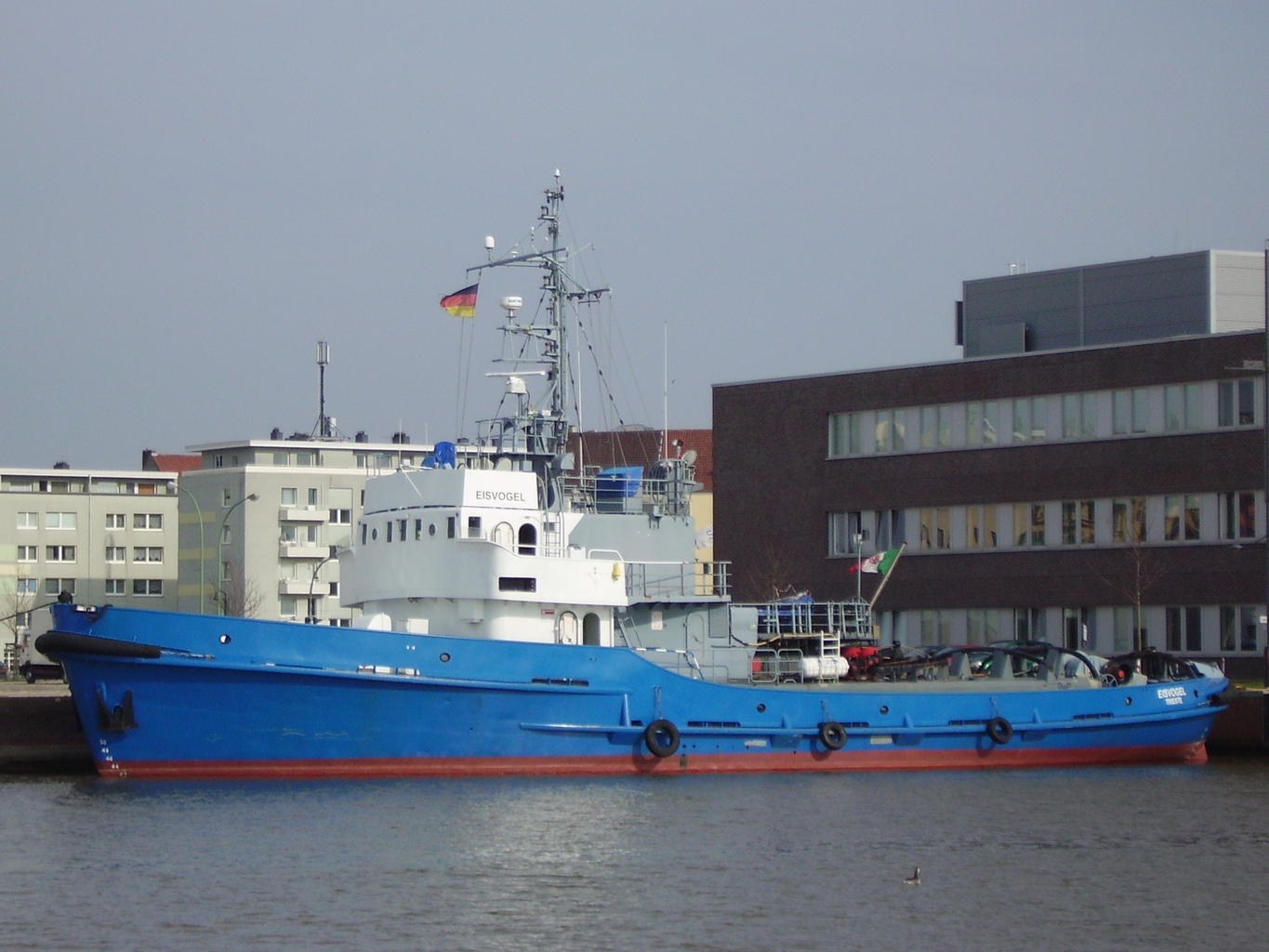
Eisvogel docked in Bremerhaven, Germany.

Icebreaker Eisvogel (English: Kingfisher) is an icebreaker employed by the Port of Vienna, Austria. Eisvogel clears ice in all three of Vienna's harbors. She is employed when the ice becomes a few centimetres in thickness. In 1985 she cleared ice that was 60 centimetres (24 in) thick.

In ice-free months the vessel is employed for official tours.

The German Navy built a 560-ton icebreaker, also named Eisvogel, which was sold off and is operated as a tugboat out of the port of Trieste.
