= Matthew Shupe =

American mathematician, chemist, meteorologist and climatologogist

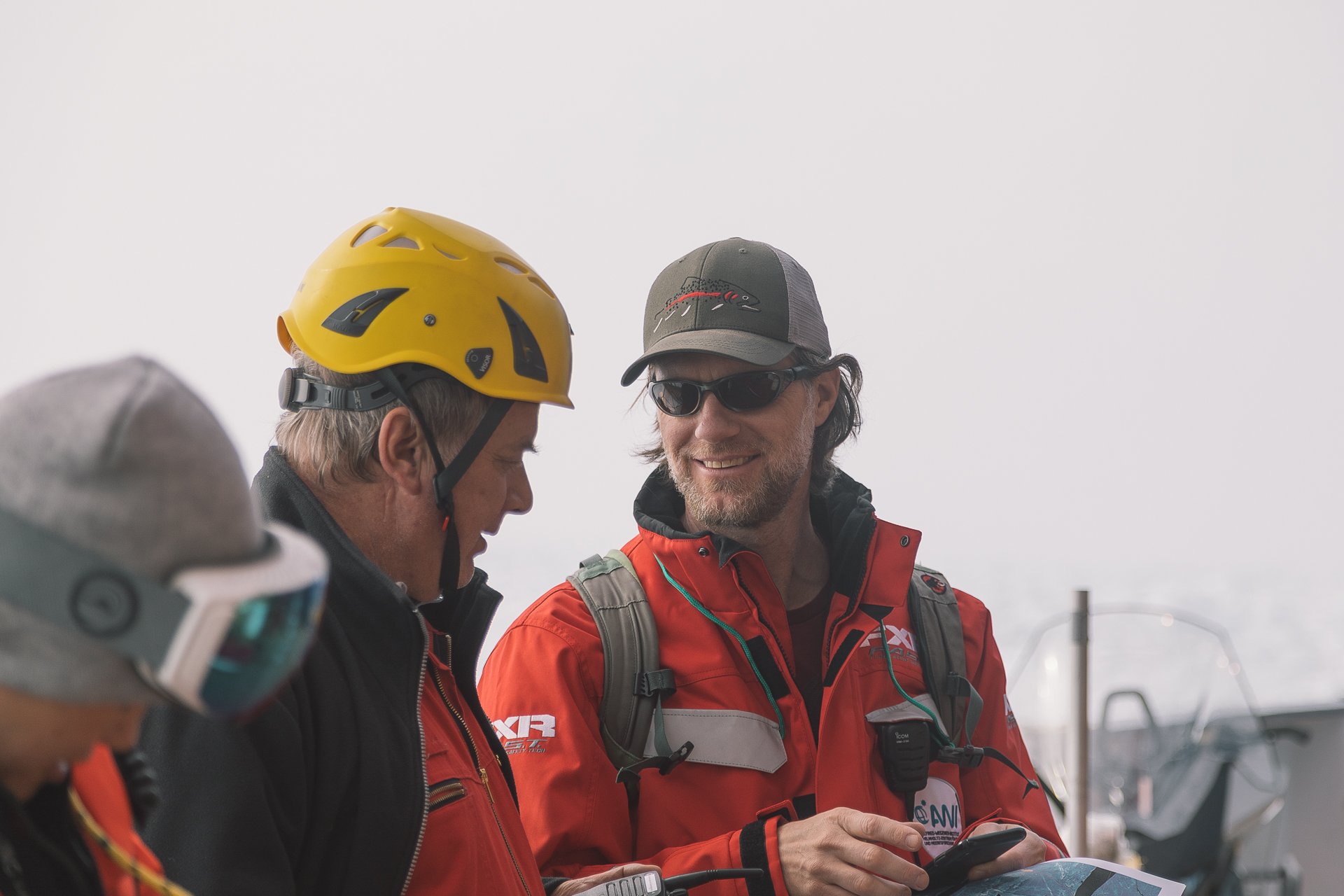
Matthew Shupe on board of RV Polarstern during MOSAiC expedition

Matthew David Shupe (fl. 1995–present) is an American mathematician, chemist, meteorologist and climatologist.

== Personal life ==
Matthew Shupe was born in Washington state but grew up in Idaho. He attended college in Colorado. After that, he studied mathematics and chemistry with a focus on atmospheric sciences at the University of Puget Sound in Washington state. He completed his studies in 1997 with a bachelor's degree in chemistry and mathematics.

In 2006, he received a master's degree in astrophysics and atmospheric sciences from the University of Colorado Boulder. In 2007, he received his doctorate there with a thesis on An intricate balance of liquid and ice: The properties, processes, and significance of Arctic stratiform mixed-phase clouds.

Shupe is married and has two sons.

== Career ==
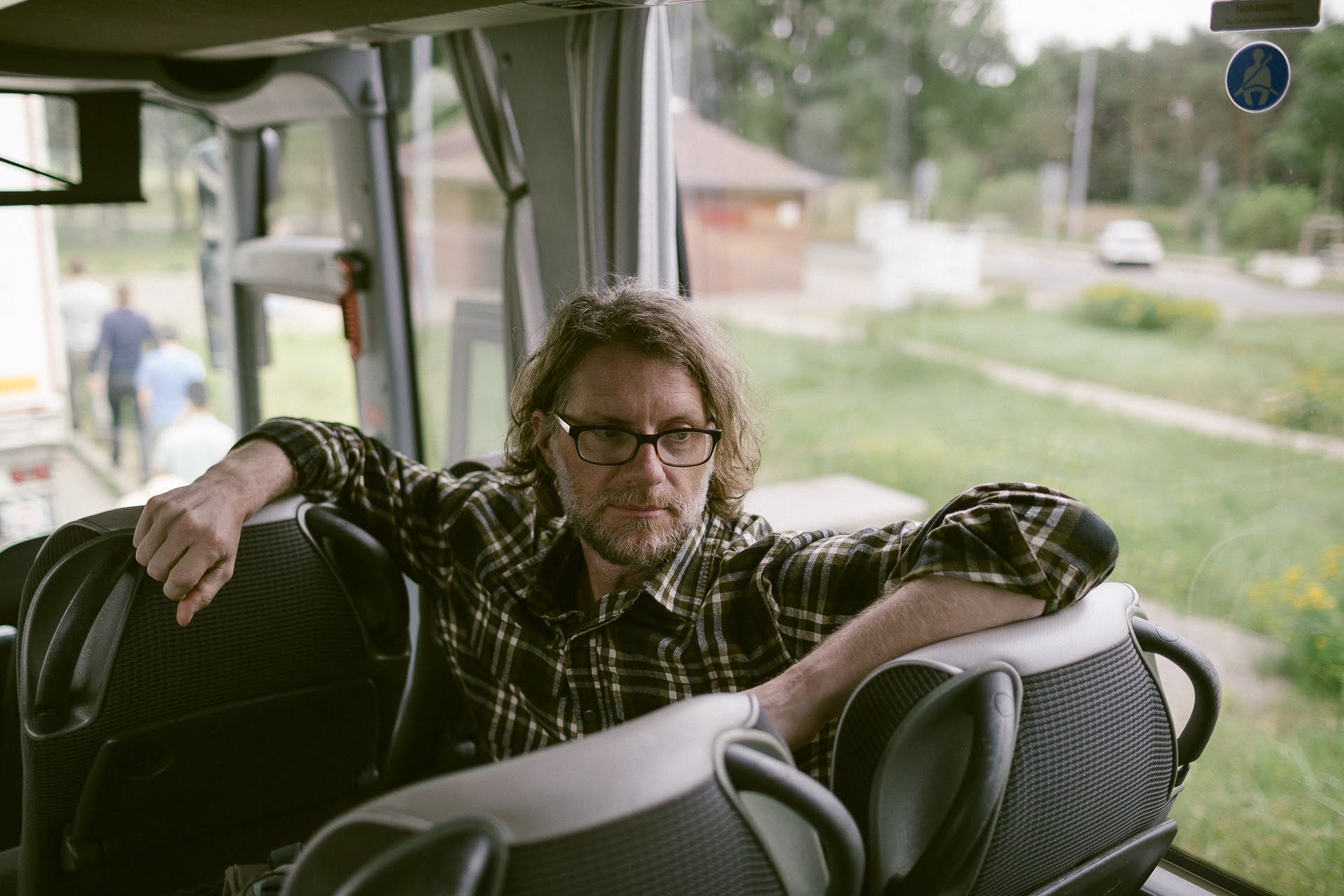
Matthew Shupe in the bus arriving from the MOSAiC expedition during the onset of COVID-19 pandemic

In 1996, he worked as a research assistant at the Pacific Northwest National Laboratory in Richland, Washington. From 1998 to 2004, he was a research scientist at the Environmental Technology Laboratory of the National Oceanic and Atmospheric Administration (NOAA). Since 2004, he has been a research associate at the Cooperative Institute for Research in Environmental Sciences (CIRES) at the University of Colorado Boulder and the Earth System Research Laboratory (ESRL) at NOAA.

From 2019 to 2020, he was a co-leader of the MOSAiC Expedition together with Klaus Dethloff and expedition leader Markus Rex. In leg 1 of MOSAiC (from 20 September 2019 to 13 December 2019) and leg 4 (from 8 June 2020 to 9 August 2020), Shupe was on board the research vessel Polarstern. During these periods, he led the Atmosphere team and was a member of the Communications / Outreach and Data teams.

== Research ==
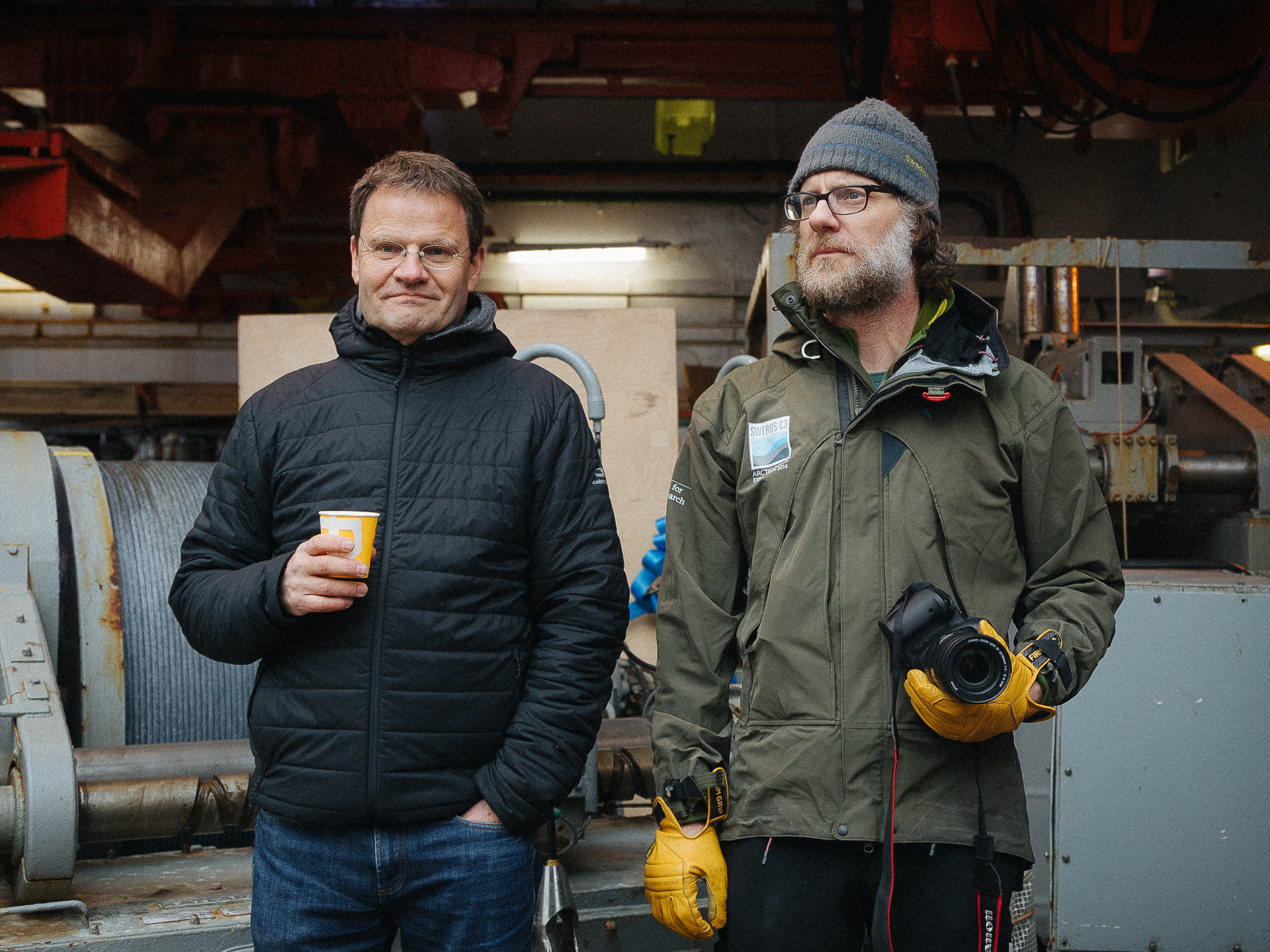
Markus Rex and Matthew Shupe aboard the research icebreaker Polarstern during the MOSAiC expedition.

His research is related to understanding the role of clouds, atmospheric structure, and surface energy exchange in the melting of sea ice and ice sheets. Based on the measurements collected during the SHEBA expedition, he showed the importance and abundance of supercooled liquid clouds in the Arctic. He discovered that clouds in which the water is liquid occur in the Arctic, even though they are much colder than zero degrees Celsius. They don't freeze into ice because there are no condensation nuclei. He also contributed to the inclusion of supercooled liquid clouds in numerical climate models, which otherwise had an incorrect representation of the surface energy budget. He showed that the cloud phase (liquid, solid, and mixed) is poorly represented in Earth climate models.

== Research projects and expeditions ==
In various capacities, Shupe took part in the following projects:

- 1997–1998: Surface Heat Budget of the Arctic Ocean (SHEBA) Project of the National Science Foundation, Beaufort Sea north of Alaska
- 1999: NOAA/ETL (Environmental Technology Laboratory) Depolarisation Lidar (DABUL = Depolarization and Backscatter Unattended Lidar) in Utqiagvik, Alaska
- 2000: High Altitude Weather Characterization Experiment, Boston
- 2002: NASA-FIRE CRYSTAL-Florida Area Cirrus Experiment, South Florida
- 2004: Mixed-Phase Arctic Clouds Experiment in Utqiagvik, Alaska
- 2005–2007: SEARCH-Projekt (Study of Environmental Arctic Change), Eureka, Canada
- 2008: Arctic Summer Cloud Ocean Study (ASCOS), Arctic Ocean
- Since 2009: ICECAPS, Summit Station, Greenland
- 2010–2011: Storm Peak Validation Experiment (StormVex), Colorado
- 2014: Arctic Clouds in Summer Experiment (ACSE), Arctic Ocean
- 2016: ICARUS campaign, Oliktok Point, Alaska
- 2019–2020: Multidisciplinary Drifting Observatory for the Study of Arctic Climate (MOSAiC) Expedition, Arctic Ocean
