= Hitzler Werft =

Shipyard company in Lauenburg, Germany

Hitzler Werft is a shipyard in Lauenberg, Germany, just outside Hamburg. The company was founded in 1885 by Johann Georg Hitzler as a boat repair yard, and went on to build barges, trawlers, freighters, tankers, tugs, launches, barges and icebreakers.

== Icebreakers ==
The icebreakers Hitzler Werft has built include:

Eisvogel	built for the German Navy, sold into civilian service in 2010
Eisbar	built for the German Navy
Kietz	built for the Wasser- und Schifffahrtsamt
Keiler	built for the Wasser- und Schifffahrtsamt
Frankfurt	built for the Wasser- und Schifffahrtsamt
