= Karin Lochte =

German oceanographer, researcher, and climate change specialist

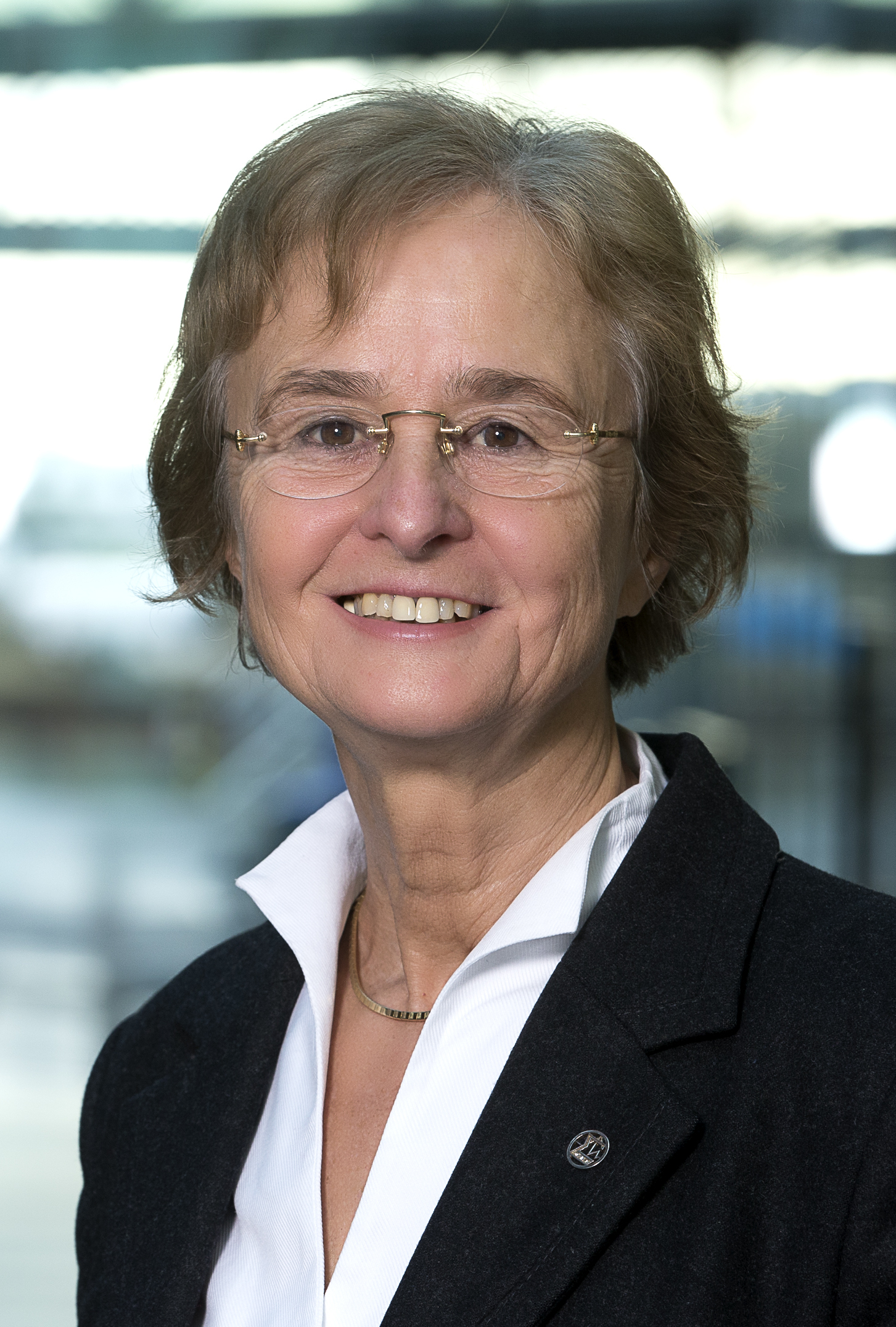
- Karin Lochte in 2016
- Born: 20 September 1952; Hanover, Germany
- Education: MA Cambridge University; PhD University of Wales
- Occupations: Director, Alfred Wegener Institute
- Scientific career
- Fields: Oceanography

Karin Lochte (born 20 September 1952) is a German oceanographer, researcher, and climate change specialist. She was director of German Polar Research Alfred Wegener Institute from 2007 to 2017 as well as chairman of the management committee of Jacobs University Bremen.

== Biography ==
Lochte was born in Hanover. She received her PhD in marine biology at the University College of North Wales in 1984.

After her PhD, she worked on deep sea microbiology at the Institut für Meereskunde, University of Kiel. Earlier in her career, Lochte was a professor of Biological Oceanography at the Leibniz Institute for Marine Sciences at the Christian-Albrechts University in Kiel where she led a research unit that focused on chemical cycles in the sea. She lectured biological oceanography at the University of Rostock and Kiel from 1995 to 2000 and subsequently at the Leibniz Institute for Baltic Sea Research in Warnemünde until 2007. She was also the project coordinator for the Atlantic Data Base for Exchange Processes at the Deep Sea Floor (ADEPD), a European Union funded marine research project from 1998 to 2000. Her involvement in polar research began in 2007, when she started work at the Alfred Wegener Institute in Bremerhaven.

Lochte was appointed as the Director of the Alfred Wegener Institute in 2007 and hold that position to 2017. Her research focussed on the interactions between ocean nutrient cycles and climate. She has been the vice-president of Earth and Environment field research for the Helmholtz Association.

== Affiliations ==
Lochte is a member of several national and international boards, scientific committees and research funding organizations. She was a member of the German Scientific Council, which advises the German Federal and state Governments and the on development of universities, science and research and is chair of the Scientific Commission of Lower Saxony. She is also a delegate of the Scientific Committee on Antarctic Research and chairperson of the Board of Governors of Jacobs University. She is on the advisory board of the Arctic Circle.

== Honours ==
- Order of Merit of the Federal Republic of Germany, 1st class, 2017, accepted by Lochte (see Hanseatic rejection)
- Honorary Fellowship from Bangor University, 2019.
