= Lochte =

Lochte is a German surname found in both Germany and the United States. Notable people with the surname include:

- Karin Lochte (born 1952), German oceanographer, researcher, and climate-change specialist
- Ryan Lochte (born 1984), American swimmer and Olympic medalist
- Jack Lochte (born 2009), American lacrosse player and D1 commit

== See also ==
- What Would Ryan Lochte Do?, 2013 reality television series
- Lochtegate, a scandal involving United States swim team members Ryan Lochte, Jimmy Feigen, Gunnar Bentz, and Jack Conger during the 2016 Summer Olympics
- Frederik Løchte Nielsen (born 1983), Danish professional male tennis player
