= Kuna (icebreaker) =

Polish river icebreaker

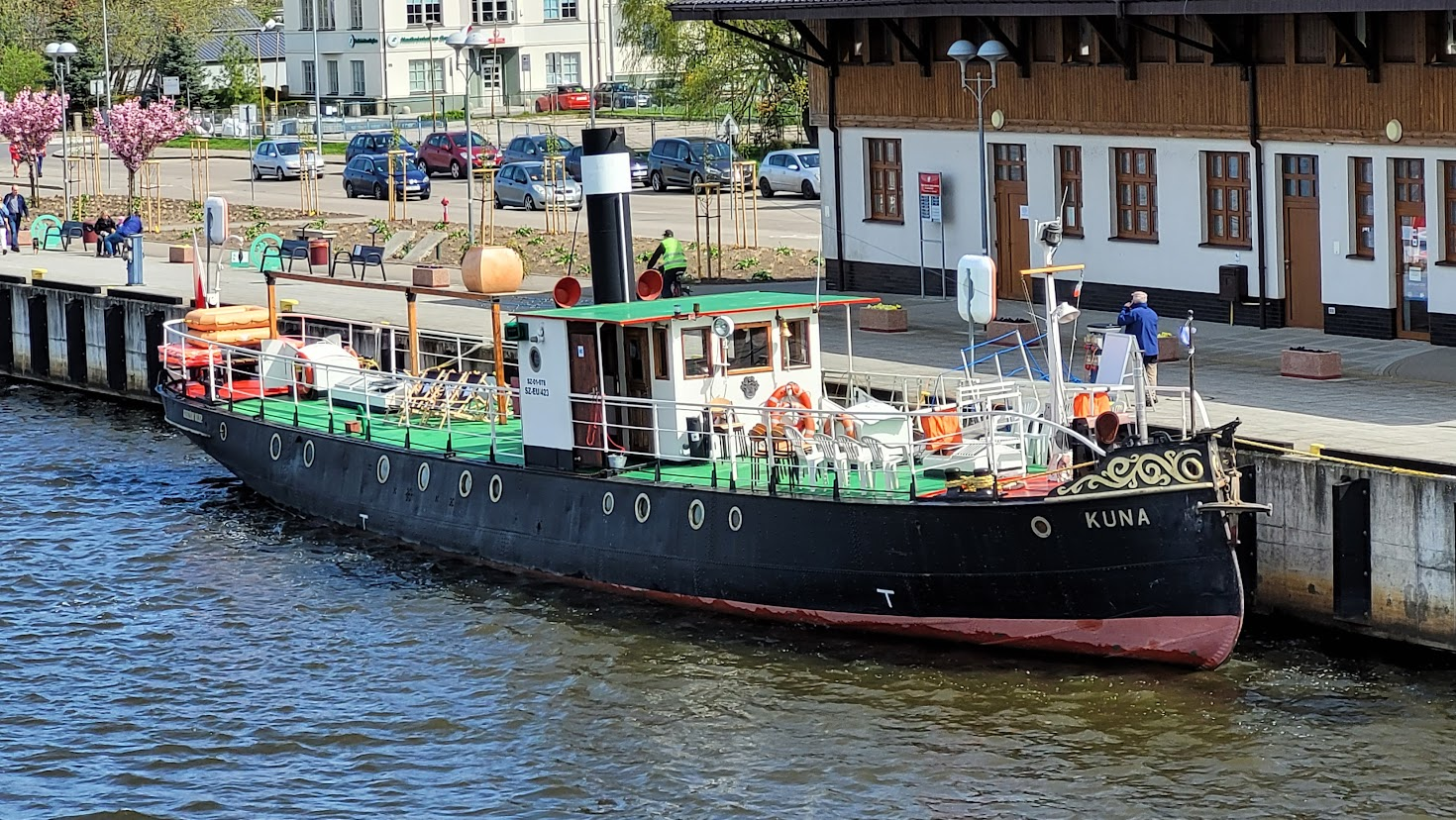
- Kuna in Gryfino

History

Poland
- Name: Kuna
- Namesake: Marten
- Owner: Przystań Gorzów
- Port of registry: Gorzów Wielkopolski
- Builder: Danziger Schiffswerft & Kesselschmiede Feliks Devrient & Co
- Launched: 1884
- Identification: Call sign SR 2685

General characteristics
- Type: River icebreaker
- Tonnage: 75 tons
- Length: 30.6 m
- Beam: 4.75 m
- Height: 2.62 m
- Draft: 1.90 m
- Installed power: SW 680 Diesel Engine (165 HP)
- Propulsion: Original piece of the propeller shaft and one propeller
- Speed: 11 knots
- Capacity: 60 passengers

Kuna is the oldest in service river icebreaker in the world, built in 1884 in Danzig. The ship which is sailing on the Oder changed flag five times. Today, it sails as a museum and training ship, intended for historical and cultural education in the field of the history of waterways, inland navigation, water construction and ecology, as well as the culture and history of the region in which it has been revitalized.

== History ==
Kuna, the fourth in a series of steam icebreakers, was built at the Danziger Schiffswerft & Kesselschmiede Feliks Devrient & Co. in 1884. Initially, the ship was named Ferse (the German name for the Wierzyca flowing into the Vistula – all four ships were named after rivers in the lower Vistula basin). In 1940, Ferse was renamed Marder (marten in German) and, in 1947, retained that meaning in Polish as Kuna. Throughout its service (except for the two-year period after the end of World War II), Kuna did not change its area of operation.

Until 1920, the ship sailed for the Königlich Preußische Weichsel-Strombauverwaltung (Royal Prussian Vistula River Works Administration). After the creation of the Free City of Danzig, it was handed over to the Port and Waterways Council together with the entire icebreaker fleet and sailed under the Danzig flag. During World War II, the ship sailed under the flag of the Third Reich and belonged to the Main Waterways Authority. In March 1945, Kuna participated in the evacuation of the population of Gdańsk; it sailed to Kiel and Hamburg, where it was taken over by the British occupation authorities after the end of the war. Under the British flag, it served in Hamburg as an icebreaker and port tugboat until 1947, when it was handed over to the Polish Maritime Mission. After returning to Gdańsk, Kuna initially belonged to the Maritime Office in Gdynia, which then handed it over to the State Water Authority in Tczew, managing inland waterways. After the renovation at the shipyard in Pleniewo, Kuna returned, under the Polish flag, to service in the lower reaches of the Vistula River.

In 1965, the ship was withdrawn from service, and in the following year reduced to an empty hull to be scrapped. In 1978 the hull was towed to Gorzów Wielkopolski and used as a mooring pontoon. In 1981 it sank in the shipyard basin and remained at the bottom for almost 20 years.

== Museum ship ==
From 2001 to 2004, the locally-established Stowarzyszenie Wodniaków Gorzowskich Kuna ("Kuna Association of Gorzow Watermen") restored the vessel to its original appearance, collected documentation, and secured the necessary permits to allow a return to active service as a museum ship, providing educational trips.

In 2014 Kuna was transferred to its current owner, Przystań Gorzów ("Port Gorzów") which continues its intended programme of educational and recreational cruises on the Warta River.

=== Voyages ===
The Kuna sails as a museum and training ship. The cruises are educational and recreational in nature, constituting one of Gorzów's summer attractions. However, it happens that due to the low level of the Warta River, the cruises are sometimes suspended. It is possible to visit the Kuna docked at the Gorzów river port on a daily basis. There is a guide on the ship giving tours both on deck and underneath.

==== Three Bridges voyage ====
This voyage starts at the eastern boulevard (next to the observation deck) and proceeds in the direction of Wieprzyce to the bridge on the Gorzów bypass. It lasts about two hours.

==== Santok voyage ====
This voyage starts at the eastern boulevard. It consists of touring the Warta River valley, a visit at the Gorzów port, and a cruise to the nearby Santok.

== Gallery ==
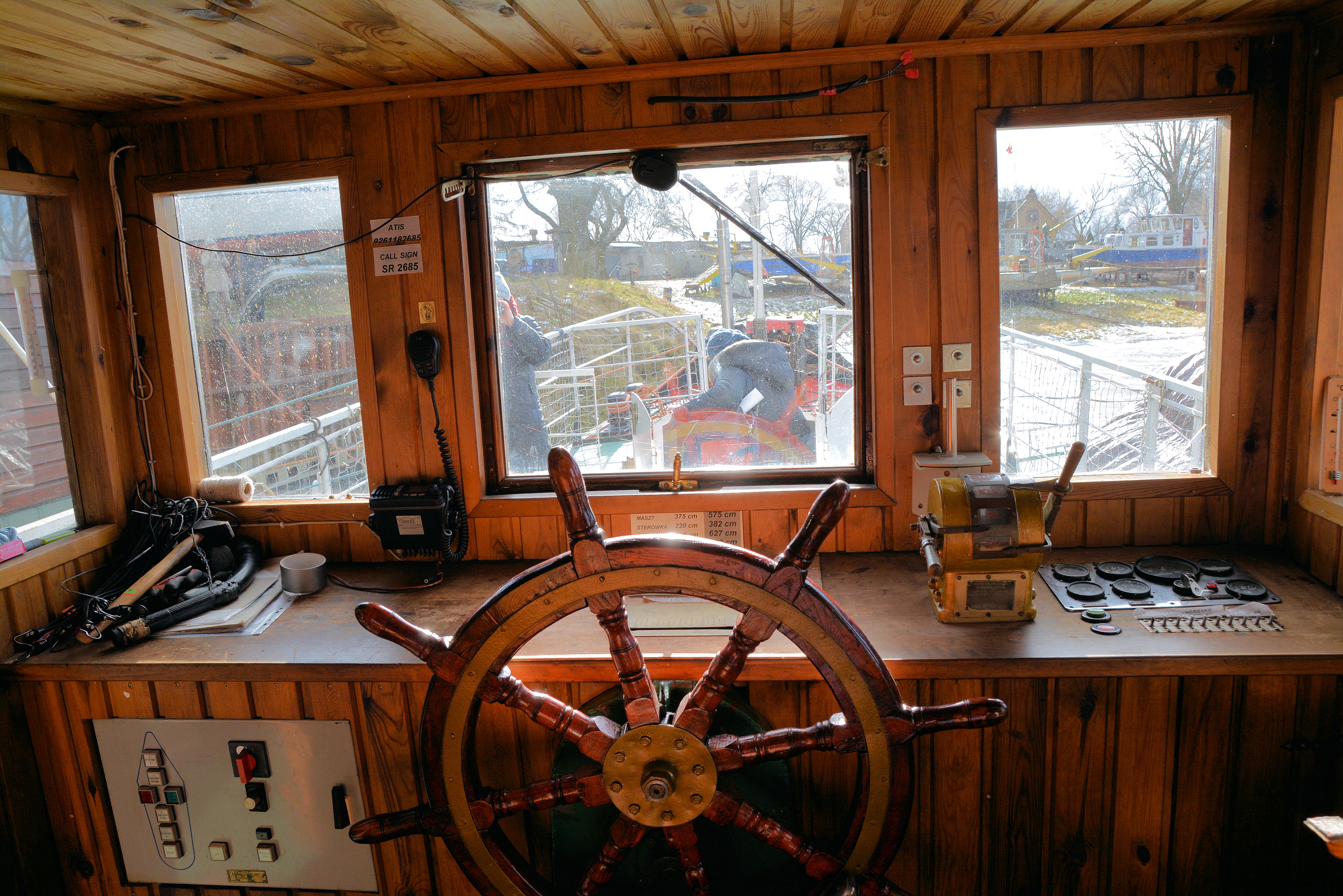
Wheelhouse

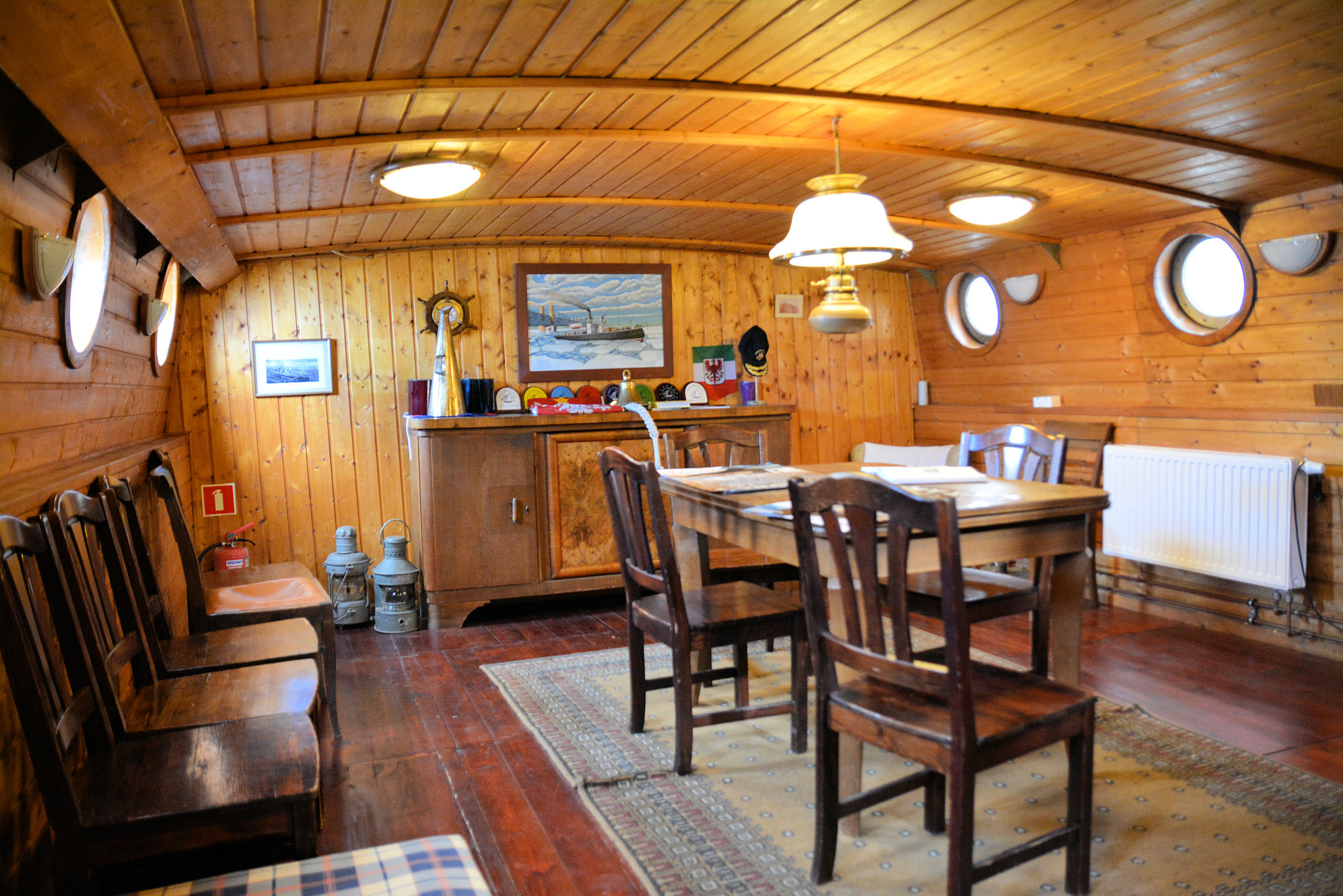
Lounge

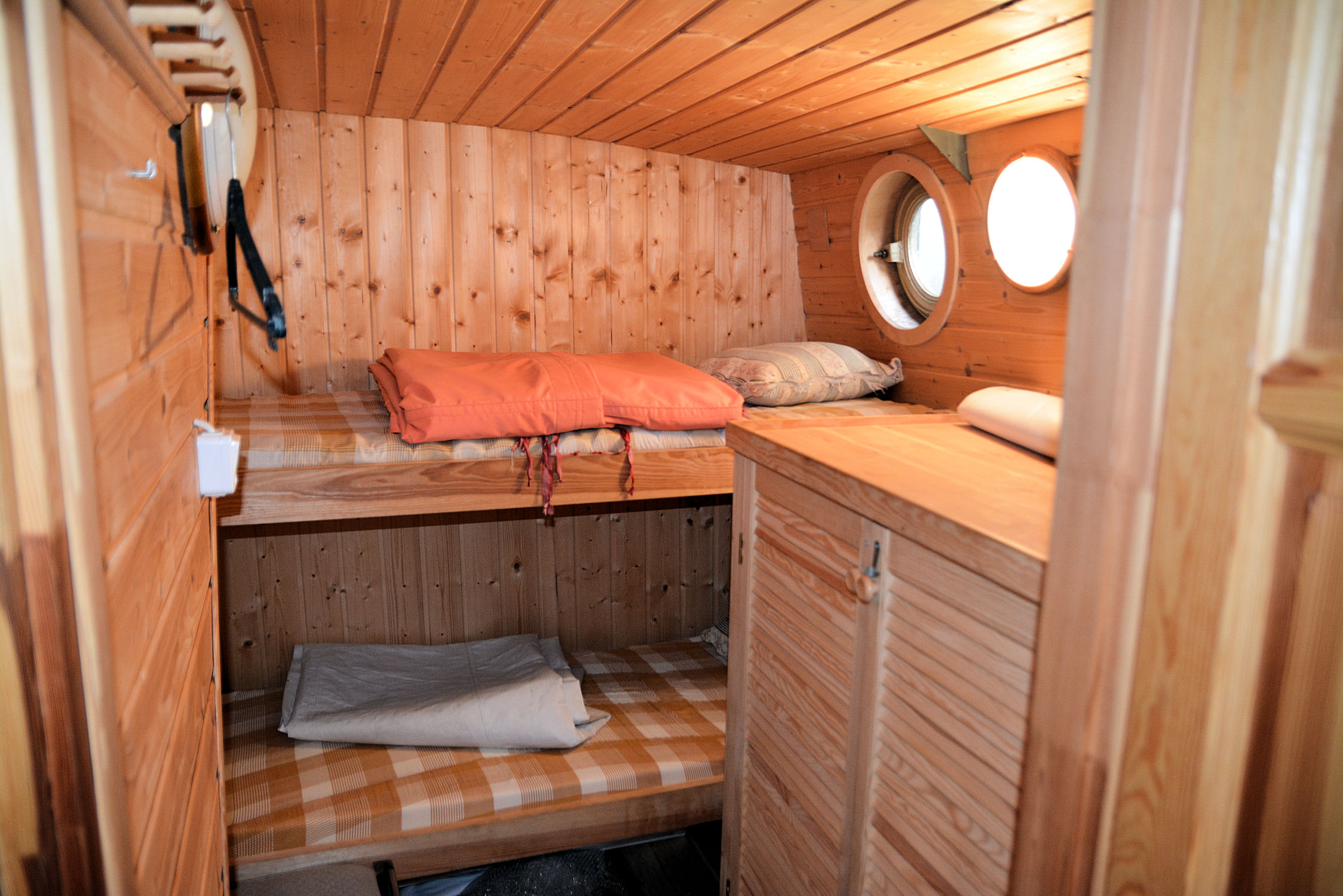
Cabin

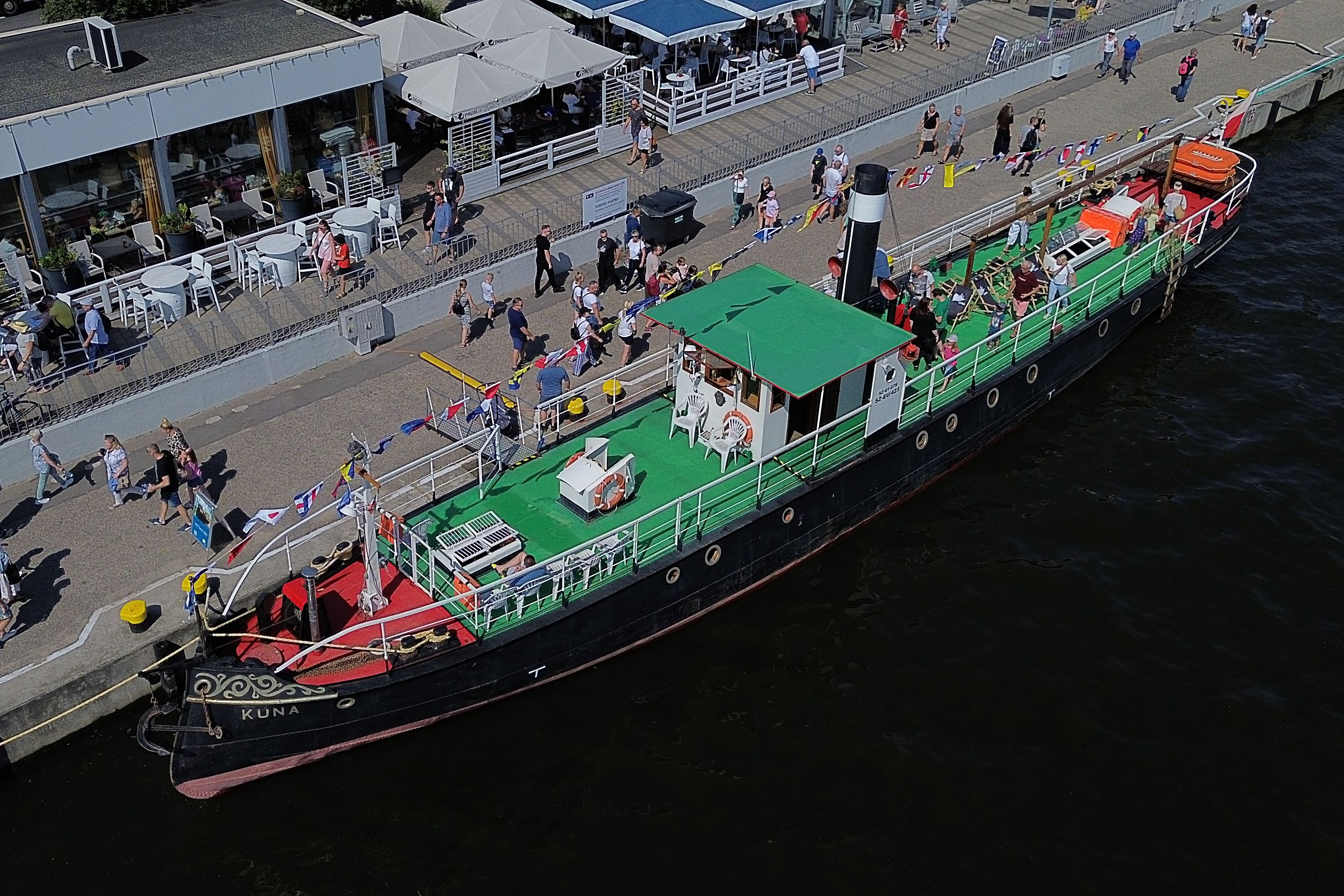
Bird view at Kuna

== See also ==
- Jantar, the oldest still in service passenger ship in Poland
