= River icebreaker =

Icebreaker designed to operate in shallow waters such as rivers and estuaries

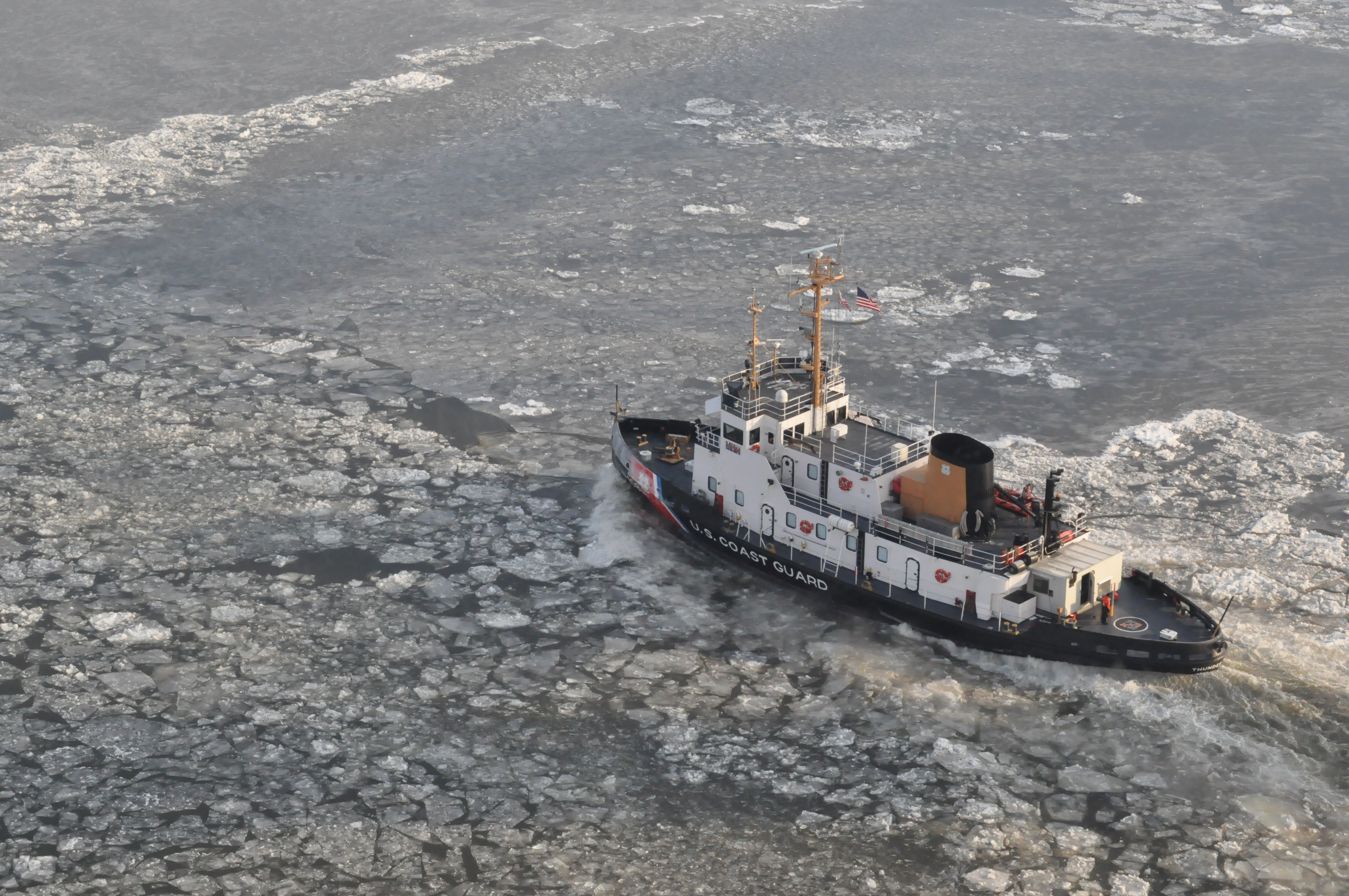
The U.S. Coast Guard Cutter Thunder Bay (WTGB-108) clears a channel for vessels to navigate the frozen Hudson River

A river icebreaker is an icebreaker specially designed to operate in shallow waters such as rivers and estuaries, and often able to pass through canals and under bridges. As published by the American Society of Civil Engineers in 1916, "On some rivers, particularly where melting first takes place on the upper river, as on the Oder and Weichsel in Germany, the formation of ice jams is a frequent cause of floods." River icebreakers can operate in any navigable waterway to prevent such ice jams.

Various river icebreakers, from smaller vessels to the nuclear-powered shallow draft icebreakers Taymyr-class Vaygach and Taymyr, are also in service in the large rivers of the Russian arctic.

The oldest river icebreaker in the world that is still in service is the Kuna.

== See also ==
- Frankfurt (icebreaker)

== Bibliography ==
- Shipping world & shipbuilder. 1994. "The latest vessel order to embody an Azipod drive is one worth about FIM 25 mill and gained recently by KMY from the Austrian Osterreichische Donaukraftwerke AG for a diesel-electric river icebreaker."
- George J. Dvorak (1972). Design of River Icebreakers; Library Search of Russian and European Literature (Supplement). Defense Technical Information Center.
- V. A. Suev (1981). Questions Concerning Icebreaking by River Icebreakers. Volume 15 of Helsinki University of Technology. Shipbuilding Laboratory. Teknillinen korkeakoulu. ISBN 978-951-752-244-1.
- Robert Edwin Peary (1907). Nearest the pole: a narrative of the polar expedition of the Peary Arctic Club in the S. S. Roosevelt, 1905-1906. Hutchinson. p. 362. "...the work which an Arctic ship has to do is not principally that of breaking up one season's ice, as is done by harbour and river icebreakers, in Canadian and Russian waters for instance."
