= Port of Vienna =

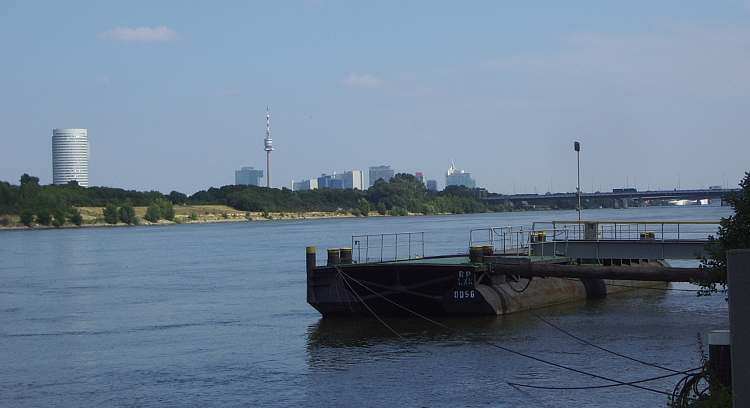
- Port of Vienna pier

Location
- Country: Austria
- Location: Vienna

Details
- Owned by: Wiener Hafen Management GmbH
- Type of harbour: Natural/Artificial
- Size: 350 acres (3.5 square kilometres)
- Employees: 241 (2007)
- General manager: Michael Hefelle

Statistics
- Vessel arrivals: 4,371 vessels (2007)
- Annual cargo tonnage: 12 milliontonnes (2007)
- Annual container volume: 323,000 TEU (2007)
- Passenger traffic: 305,000 people (2007)
- Annual revenue: 45 million Euro
- Website http://www.wienerhafen.com (in German)

The Port of Vienna is the largest Austrian river port and one of the largest ports on the Danube River, with a total annual traffic capacity of around 12 million tonnes of cargo.

== Statistics ==
In 2007 the Port of Vienna handled 12,000,000 tonnes of cargo and 323,000 TEUs making it the busiest cargo and container port in Austria and one of the largest in Central Europe.

General statistics in 2007
Year	2007
Containers TEU's	323,000
Automobiles (new units)	72,000
Passengers (nr)	305,000
Total^{*}'	12

* figures in millions of tonnes

== Terminals ==
=== Container terminal ===
The terminal was opened in 2000 and has a storage area of 60,000 m^{2} (15 acres).

=== Automobile terminal ===
The cars terminal is one of the largest in Central Europe used for imports of new cars and can accommodate 10,000 cars at once on a 160,000 m^{2} (40-acre) plot of land.

=== General cargo ===
The general cargo terminal has a storage area of 270,000 m^{2} (67 acres).

=== Passenger terminal ===
The Port of Vienna has one of the largest passenger terminals on the Danube River; it handled 305,000 passengers in 2007.
