= Keiler =

History

Germany
- Name: Keiler
- Namesake: Boar
- Operator: Wasser- und Schifffahrtsamt
- Builder: Hitzler Werft, Lauenburg, Germany
- Cost: €5m
- In service: 2011
- Homeport: Geesthacht
- Identification: ENI number: 05043110; MMSI number: 211551290; Callsign: DG7070
- Status: in active service

General characteristics
- Type: River icebreaker
- Length: 33.23 m (109 ft 0 in)
- Beam: 8.45 m (27 ft 9 in)
- Height: 4.00 m (13 ft 1 in)
- Draught: 1.45 m (4 ft 9 in)
- Crew: 4

Keiler is a river icebreaker commissioned in December 2011 to serve as the flagship of Lauenburg's Water and Shipping Authority fleet of ten icebreakers, on the Elbe River. The vessel is 33.21 metres (109.0 ft) long and 8.45 metres (27.7 ft) wide. She has a crew of four, and has sleeping and dining accommodation for operations that take longer than a single shift.

She is the first icebreaker built for the water authority in 24 years.

In February 2012 the upper reaches of the Elbe were beset by the worst ice jams since 1987. The jams were 20 kilometers long, and upstream communities faced flooding as water built up behind the ice dams. The Keiler and sister ships Büffel, Widder, and Wisent were dispatched from their normal stations to attack the ice jam. They had to be careful blocks of ice they freed did not form jams downstream. This crisis represents the first time the water authorities icebreakers were used at night.
