= IOW =

IOW or iow may refer to:

== Language ==
- Chiwere language, a Siouan language of the United States with ISO 639-3 code iow.
- Initialism of in other words.

== Organisations ==
- InsideOUT Writers, an American prison reform organisation
- Leibniz Institute for Baltic Sea Research (German: Leibniz-Institut für Ostseeforschung Warnemünde)

== Places ==
- Isle of Wight, an island in the English channel
- Iowa City Municipal Airport, Iowa, United States
