= Frankfurt (icebreaker) =

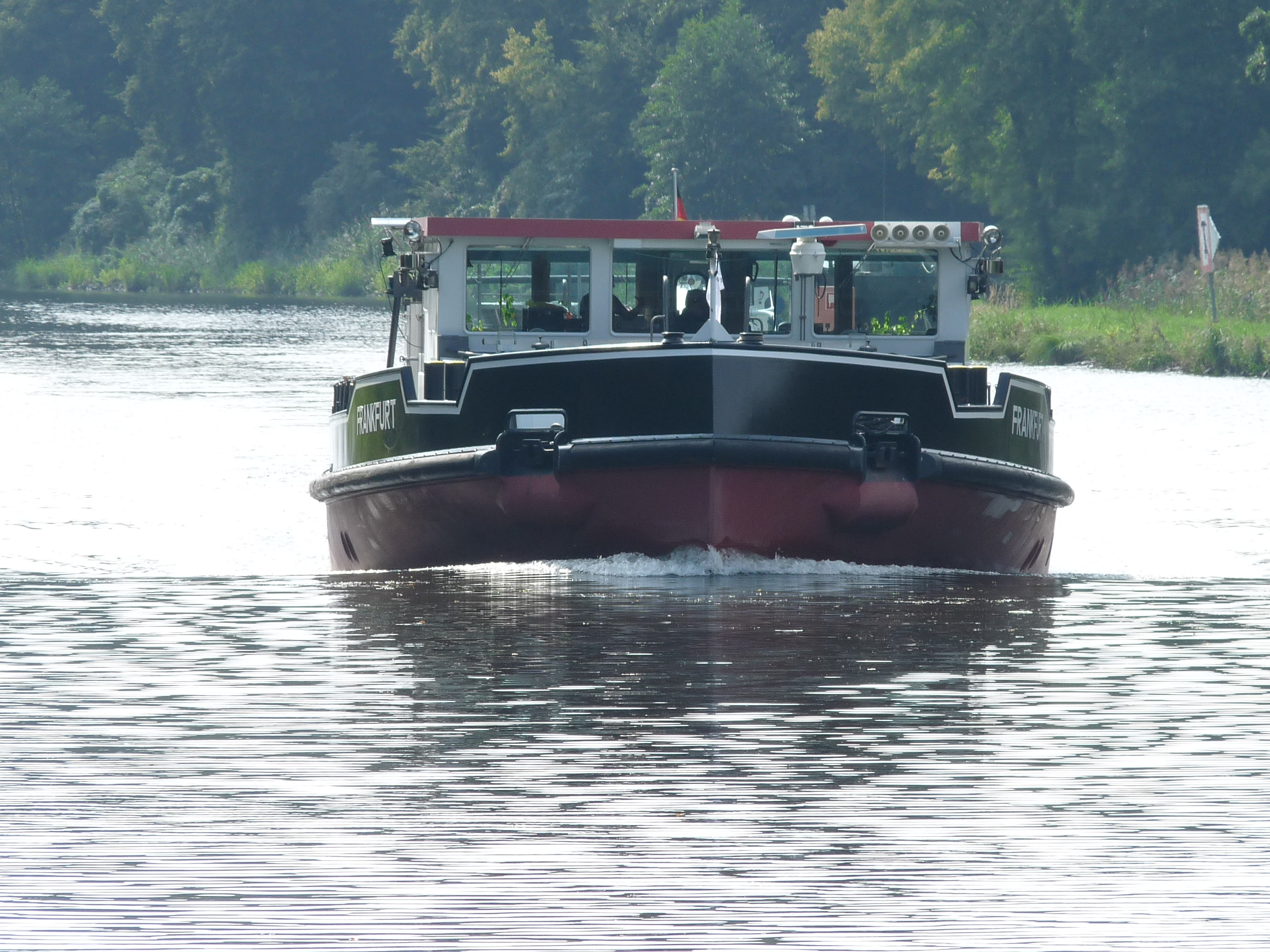

History

Germany
- Name: Frankfurt
- Operator: Wasser- und Schifffahrtsamt Eberswalde
- Builder: Hitzler Werft, Lauenburg, Germany
- Yard number: 821
- Launched: 2002
- Home port: Eberswalde
- ENI number: 05039960

General characteristics
- Type: River icebreaker
- Length: 33.25 m (109 ft 1 in)
- Beam: 8.60 m (28 ft 3 in)
- Draught: 1.55 m (5 ft 1 in)
- Depth: 2.50 m (8 ft 2 in)
- Propulsion: Diesel-electric; 2 × MAN D 2842 LE 301 532 kW (713 hp) diesel generators; 1 × GC 45.24 M 700 kW (939 hp) electric motor; 1 × 20 hp (15 kW) auxiliary diesel engine; 1 shaft
- Speed: 18 km/h (11 mph)
- Crew: 4 or 5

Frankfurt is a prototype river icebreaker constructed by Hitzler Werft for icebreaking duties on the Elbe River, Oder River, and canals in Germany, operated by the Wasser und Schifffahrtsamt Eberswalde. She was built in 2002. Three further vessels, built to a similar design, were ordered by the Wasser und Schifffahrtsamt in 2009.

As the lead ship of her class, models of the Frankfurt underwent testing in a large ice-tank laboratory. She cost €4.2 million.

Her design features a pair of diesel generators that power electric motors that actually drive the propeller. The use of a diesel-electric system provides a "good torque curve", and eliminates the need for a bulky gearbox. The electric motor can consume up to 700 kilowatts (940 hp) She has a third "harbor diesel" of 15 kilowatts (20 hp).
