= Wasserstraßen- und Schifffahrtsamt =

German government agency re watercraft

The Wasserstraßen- und Schifffahrtsamt (Waterways and Shipping Authority; abbreviated WSA) is a German federal agency, responsible for the administration of federal navigable waters and for the regulation of vessel traffic.

The seventeen offices (plural: Wasserstraßen- und Schifffahrtsämter, abbr. WSÄ) are supervised by the national Wasserstraßen- und Schifffahrtsverwaltung des Bundes (WSV – Federal Waterways and Shipping Administration) and accountable to the Federal Ministry for Digital and Transport. In total the offices cover 23,000 km^{2} of maritime waters and 7,350 km of inland waterways.

== WSA stations ==
Each WSA has a defined geographical coverage. For example, WSA Elbe covers the river Elbe from the border of Czech Republic until Hamburg together with tributaries and the Elbe-Lübeck Canal; WSA Main covers the navigable German federal waterway Main.

== Service ==
=== Waterways ===
The waterways and shipping offices carry out the following tasks for the Federal Waterways and Shipping Administration:

- Maintenance and operation of the federal waterways and the federal shipping facilities (such as locks, weirs, operations centers, etc.)
- Policing
- Setting and operating of navigation signs
- Measuring water levels
- Removing ice using icebreakers

The Administration operates a fleet of about a dozen icebreakers. The newest, the Keiler, was delivered in December 2011. Their oldest existing icebreaker, the Steinbock, was commissioned in 1935. The Keiler, and another new vessel, the Kietz, are 33.21 metres (109.0 ft) long and 8.45 metres (27.7 ft) wide, with a draft of 1.4 metres (4.6 ft). They are diesel powered, with engines that produce 1,100 horsepower (820 kW). They cost €5 million each. Other vessels include the Widder, Stier and the Wisent.

=== Inland navigation ===
The law gives the waterways and shipping offices the following tasks in inland navigation:

- Promotion of inland waterway transport
- Maintaining the safety and flow of traffic, policing shipping, and preventing environmental harm
- Granting permission for watercraft to travel on federal waterways

=== Sea navigation ===
- Promotion of the German merchant fleet and maintaining seaports
- Maintaining the safety and flow of traffic, policing shipping, and preventing environmental harm
- Policing shipping outside German territorial waters
- Carrying out other tasks of the federal government related to maritime shipping

== See also ==
- Frankfurt (icebreaker)
