= Eisvogel-class icebreaker =

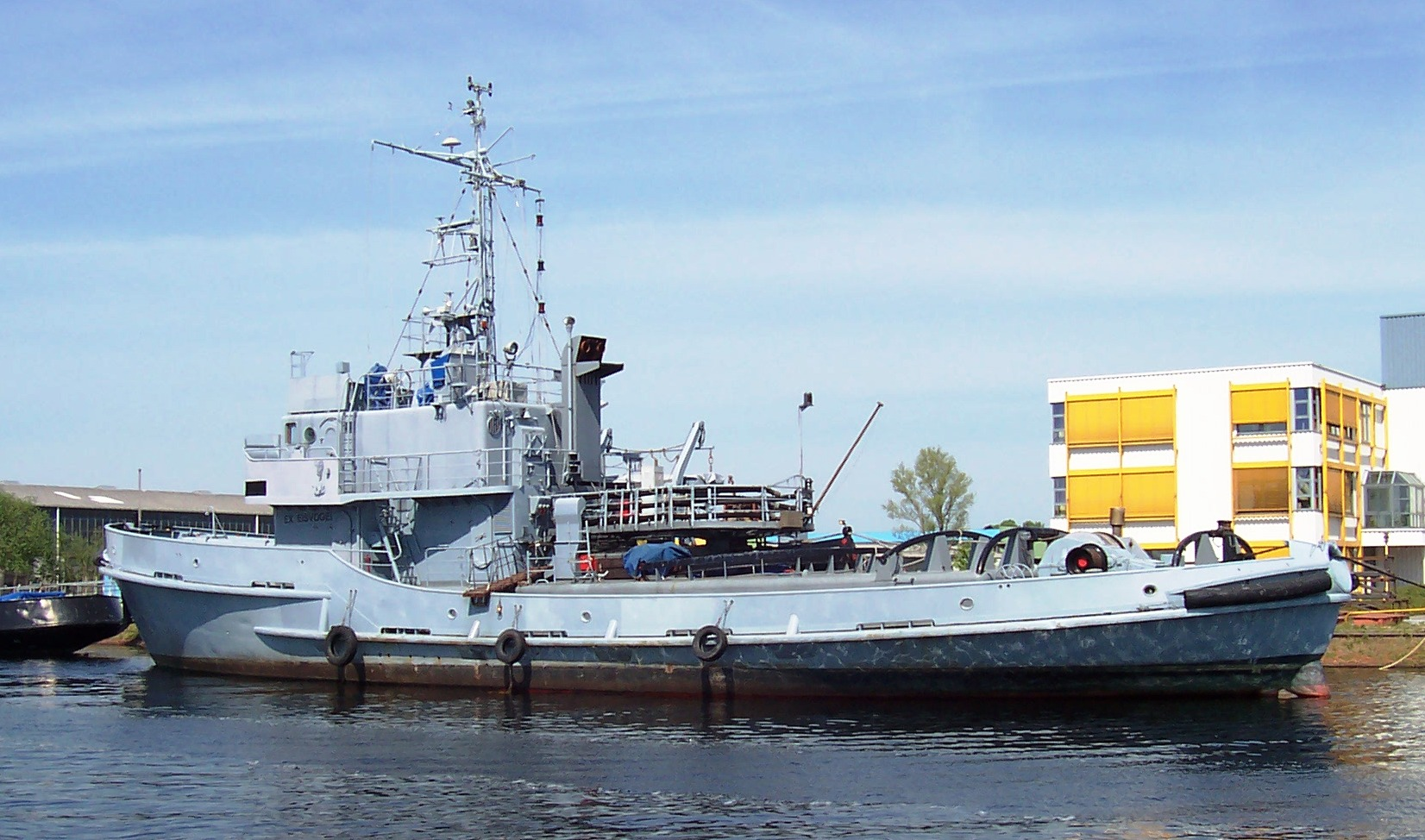
- Eisvogel laid up in Wilhelmshaven

Class overview
- Builders: Hitzler Werft
- Operators: German Navy
- In commission: 1961–2006
- Completed: 2
- Retired: 2

General characteristics
- Displacement: 560 tonnes
- Length: 38.85 m (127 ft 6 in)
- Beam: 9.7 m (31 ft 10 in)
- Draft: 3.72 m (12 ft 2 in)
- Propulsion: 2 × Maybach MD655 diesel engines, generating 1,765 kW at 1,400 rpm; One controlled-pitch propeller, 3 m diameter
- Speed: 13 knots (24 km/h)
- Range: 2,000 nmi (3,700 km; 2,300 mi) at 12 knots (22 km/h; 14 mph)
- Complement: 16 civilians
- Sensors & processing systems: Navigation radar only
- Armament: Fitted for one Bofors 40 mm anti-aircraft gun
- Notes: 140 tonne Hitzler pitching device (for icebreaking)

The Eisvogel-class icebreakers (Type 721) was a two ship class built for the German Navy by the Hitzler Werft shipyard of Lauenburg/Elbe.

The Eisvogel was in service for the Naval Base Command Kiel and sold to private owners after decommissioning. Since 2010 she is operated as a civil tugboat in Trieste.

The Eisbär was based along the German North Sea coast. After decommissioning she was laid up in Wilhelmshaven later sold to the Netherlands.

== List of Ships ==
Pennant number	Name	Call sign	Launched	Commissioned	Decommissioned	Fate/Base
A 1401	Eisvogel		April 28, 1960	March 11, 1961	March 3, 2006	Sold to Italy
A 1402	Eisbär		June 9, 1969	November 1, 1961	October 30, 1997	Sold to the Netherlands

The ships are named after the European kingfisher (Eisvogel) and polar bear (Eisbär), both names contain the German word for ice.
