= Leibniz Institute for Baltic Sea Research =

Research institution in Germany

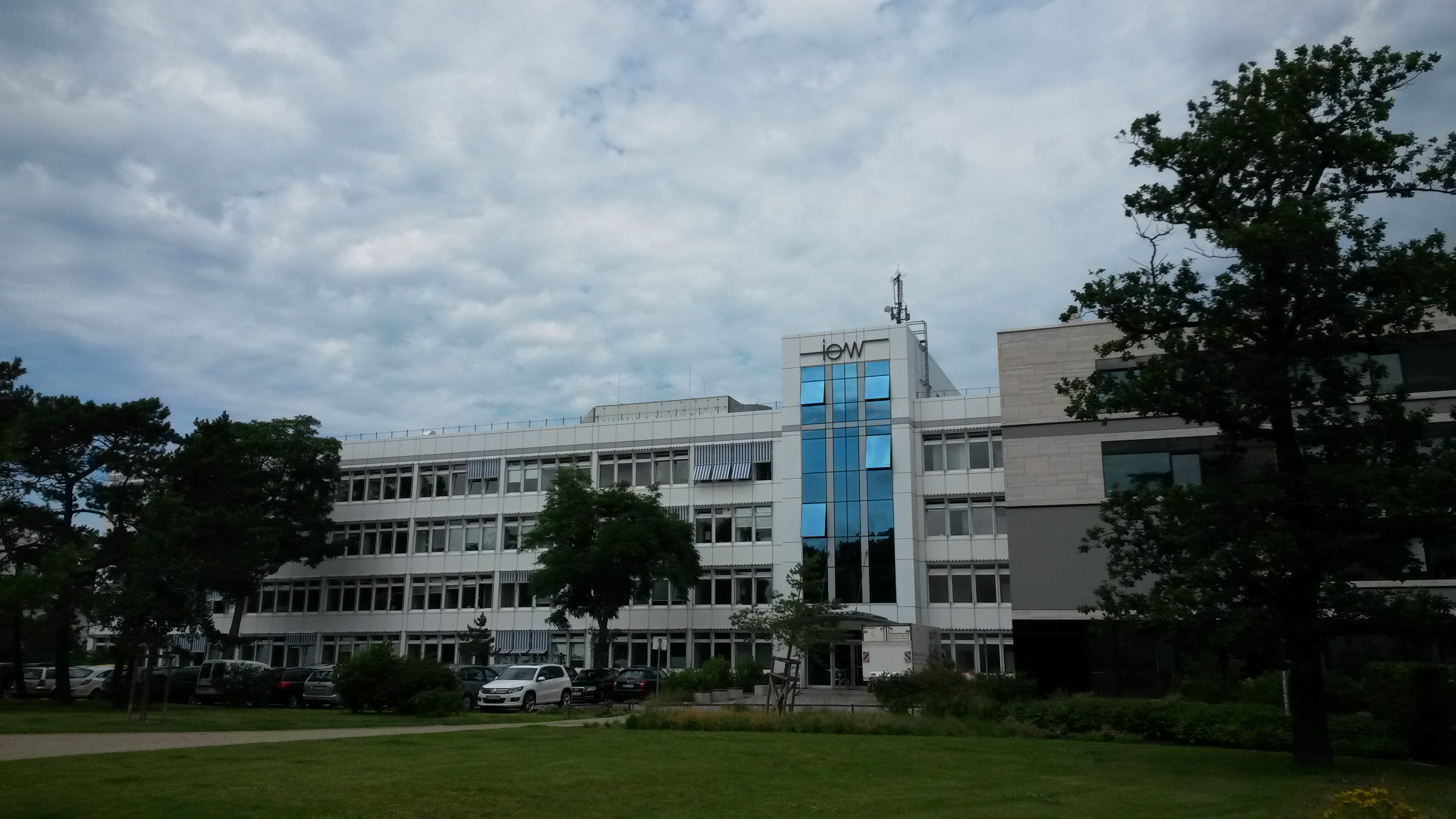
The Leibniz Institute for Baltic Sea Research in 2014

The Leibniz Institute for Baltic Sea Research Warnemünde (IOW) (German: Leibniz-Institut für Ostseeforschung Warnemünde) is a non-university research institution located in Warnemünde (Rostock), Germany. Its main focus lies in the interdisciplinary study of coastal oceans and marginal seas, especially related to the Baltic Sea. It was founded in 1992 and is part of the Leibniz Association. The institute is the successor of the former Institute of Oceanography ("Institut für Meereskunde") which was part of the East German Academy of Science.

The institute is divided in five departments: Physical Oceanography, Marine Chemistry, Biological Oceanography, Marine Geology and Marine Observations. The research is based on the ten-year research programme "Perspectives of Coastal Research" 2024-2033, which comprises three interdisciplinary research areas. Central task of the institute is fundamental to applied research but also teaching at the University of Rostock and the University of Greifswald. It employs about 260 people, thereof ca. 150 researchers. IOW has direct access to the research vessel Elisabeth Mann Borgese. The institute is financed by the German Federal Ministry of Research, Education and Space (BMFTR) and the Ministry of Research, Culture, Federal and European Affairs of Mecklenburg-Western Pomerania.

== IOW Knowledge Transfer ==
In addition to research and teaching, the IOW fulfills numerous tasks related to the transfer of scientific data. Its most important task is the transfer of knowledge to authorities and institutions active in environmental policy, such as the Federal Maritime and Hydrographic Agency (BSH) and the Federal Agency for Nature Conservation (BfN). The institute monitors and evaluates the condition of the Baltic Sea, which can directly feed into national and supranational environmental protection measures. The IOW is committed to transferring knowledge to the public. For example, the Warnemünde Evenings take place every summer; every two years the IOW participates in Baltic Sea Day and cooperates with schools and the media. The IOW collaborates with companies to improve the technologies used and develop new technologies.
