= 9K32 Strela-2 =

9K32 Strela-2 SA-7 Grail SA-N-5 Grail
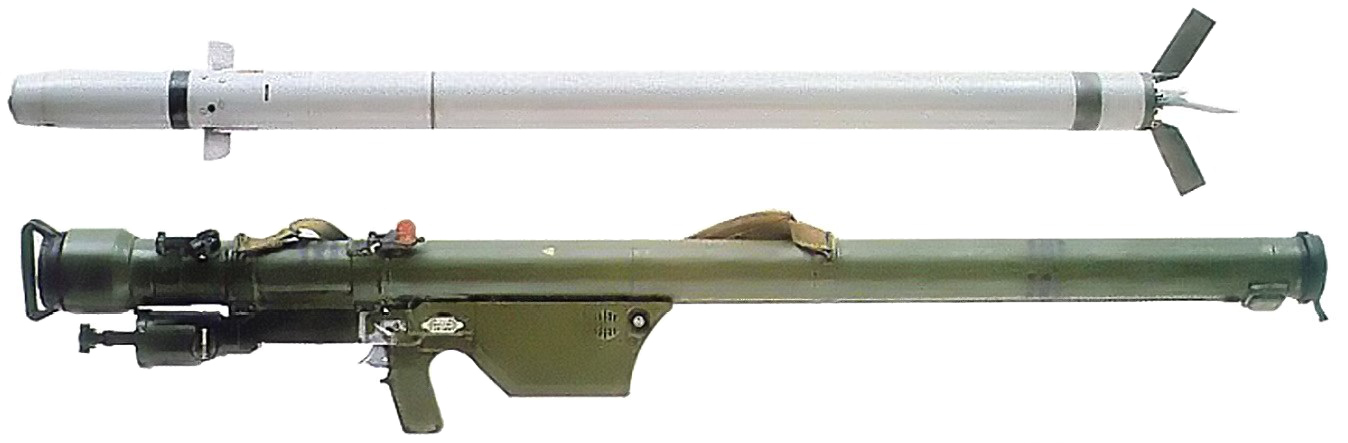
- KBM Kolomna 9K32M Strela-2M (SA-7b) missile and canister
- Type: Man portable surface-to-air missile launcher
- Place of origin: Soviet Union

Service history
- In service: 1970–present
- Used by: See operators
- Wars: War of Attrition; Yom Kippur War; Portuguese Colonial War; Vietnam War; Cambodian Civil War; The Troubles; Basque conflict Western Sahara War; Communist insurgency in Thailand; Rhodesian Bush War; Nicaraguan Revolution; Uganda–Tanzania War; Salvadoran Civil War; 1982 Lebanon War; Lebanese Civil War; Iran–Iraq War; Gulf War; Falklands War; Second Sudanese Civil War; South African Border War; Soviet–Afghan War; War in Afghanistan; Syrian occupation of Lebanon; Yugoslav Wars; Iraq War; Libyan Civil War; Insurgency in Egypt; Sinai insurgency Syrian Civil War; War in Donbas; Yemeni Civil War; Libyan Civil War; Russo-Ukrainian war Gaza war Iran war

Production history
- Designer: KBM (Kolomna)
- Designed: c. 1964
- Unit cost: US$75,000 (launcher with 5 missiles, export price to Libya, 1972–1973)
- Variants: See versions

Specifications
- Mass: 9.8 kg (21.6 lb) (Strela-2M missile); 15 kg (33.1 lb) (system, ready to fire)
- Length: 1.44 m (4 ft 9 in)
- Diameter: 72 mm (2.8 in)
- Wingspan: 0.3 m
- Effective firing range: 800 m (2,600 ft) (Strela-2M) (minimal range)
- Maximum firing range: 3,700 m (12,100 ft) (Strela-2); 4,200 m (13,800 ft) (Strela-2M)
- Warhead weight: 1.15 kg (2.5 lb) directed-energy blast fragmentation warhead (Strela-2M), 370 g (13 oz) HE content
- Detonation mechanism: Non-delay impact and grazing fuzes, 14–17 second delay self-destruct.
- Flight altitude: 50–1500 m (Strela-2); 50–2300 m (Strela-2M)
- Maximum speed: 430 m/s (1,400 ft/s) (Strela-2); 500 m/s (1,600 ft/s)(Strela-2M)
- Guidance system: Infra-red passive homing (AM-modulated reticle seeker head with uncooled PbS detector element), proportional navigation logic

The 9K32 Strela-2 (Russian: Cтрела, lit. 'Arrow'; NATO reporting name SA-7 Grail) is a light-weight, shoulder-launched, surface-to-air missile or MANPADS system. It is designed to target aircraft at low altitudes with passive infrared-homing guidance and destroy them with a high-explosive warhead.

Broadly comparable in performance with the US Army FIM-43 Redeye, the Strela-2 was the first Soviet man-portable SAM; full-scale production began in 1970. While the Redeye and 9K32 Strela-2 were similar, the missiles were not identical.

The Strela-2 was a staple of the Cold War and was produced in huge numbers for the Soviet Union and their allies, as well as guerillas. Though since surpassed by more modern systems, the Strela and its variants remain in service in many countries, and have seen use in nearly every regional conflict since 1972.

== Development ==
The end of World War II led to a major shift in Soviet defence policy. The advent of long range, high altitude, nuclear-armed American bombers, capable of penetrating Soviet airspace at heights and speeds unreachable and unmatchable by anti-aircraft guns and most interceptors, appeared to render every conventional weapon obsolete at a stroke. Numerous long-range, high-altitude SAM systems, such as the S-25 Berkut and S-75 Dvina, were rapidly developed and fielded to counter this large vulnerability. However, relatively little development took place to field mobile battlefield air defences due to the apparent obsolescence of conventional arms.

This direction was soon changed with the beginning of the Korean War. An entirely conventional conflict, it proved that nuclear weapons were not the be-all and end-all of warfare. In the face of a powerful and modern American air force, carrying non-nuclear payloads, the Soviet Union invested heavily in a multi-tier air defence system, consisting of several new mobile SAMs, to cover all altitude ranges and protect ground forces. The new doctrine listed five requirements:

- Front-level medium-to-high-altitude area defense system 9K8 Krug (NATO designation SA-4 "Ganef")
- Army-level low-to-medium-range area defense system 3K9 Kub (NATO designation SA-6 "Gainful")
- Division-level low-altitude short-range system 9K33 Osa (NATO designation SA-8 "Gecko")
- Regiment-level all-weather radar-guided gun system ZSU-23-4 "Shilka" and very-short-range missile systems 9K31 Strela-1 (NATO designation SA-9 "Gaskin")
- Battalion-level man-portable 9K32 Strela-2 (NATO designation SA-7 "Grail")

Both Strela-1 and Strela-2 were initially intended to be man-portable systems. As the Strela-2 proved to be a considerably smaller and lighter package, however, the role of the Strela-1 was changed, becoming a heavier, vehicle-mounted system with increased range and performance to better support the ZSU-23-4 in the regimental air defense role.

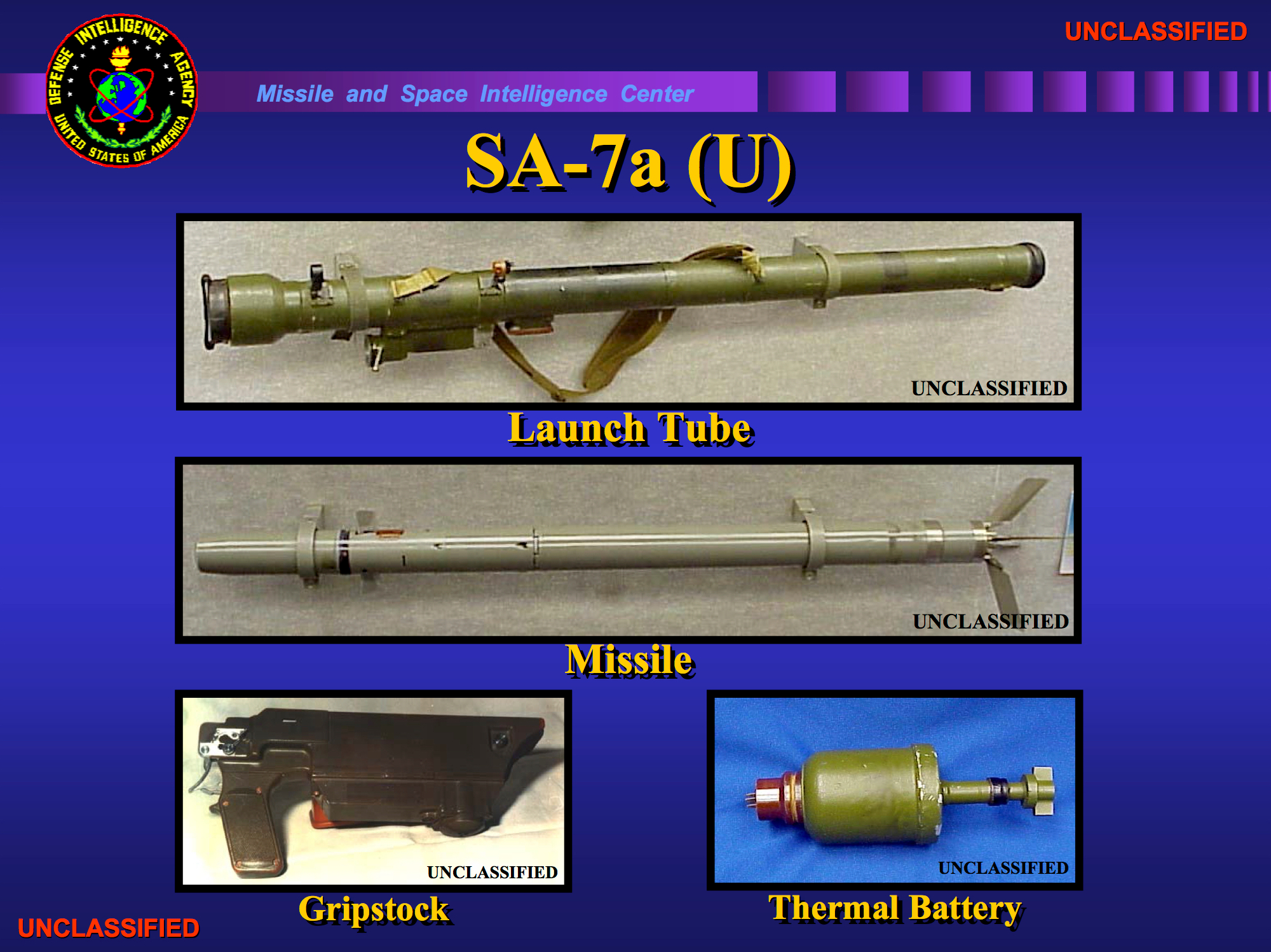
SA-7a components. It is best distinguished by the squarish gripstock.

As development began in the Turopov OKB (later changed to Kolomna), detailed information on the design of the US FIM-43 Redeye became available. While it was not a reverse-engineered copy, in many ways the Strela design borrowed heavily from the Redeye, which had started development a few years earlier. Due to the comparatively primitive Soviet technical base, development was protracted, and many problems arose, especially in designing a sufficiently small seeker head and rocket. Eventually, the designers settled for a simpler seeker head than that of the Redeye, allowing the initial version, the 9K32 "Strela-2" (US DoD designation SA-7A, missile round 9M32) to finally enter service in 1968, five years behind schedule. At the time, it was described by one expert as being "the premier Russian export line".

=== Improvements ===
The initial variant suffered from numerous shortcomings: it could only engage targets flying at relatively slow airspeeds and low altitudes and then only from rear hemisphere, it suffered from poor guidance reliability (particularly in the presence of natural or man-made background IR radiation sources), and even when a hit was achieved, it often failed to destroy the target. Poor lethality was an issue especially when used against jet aircraft: the hottest part of the target was the nozzle behind the actual engine, which the missile therefore usually hit; but there its small warhead often failed to cause significant damage to the engine itself.

In order to address the shortcomings, two improved versions were ordered in 1968; as an intermediate stop-gap the slightly improved 9K32M "Strela-2M" (NATO reporting name SA-7b) to replace the original, as well as the more ambitious Strela-3.

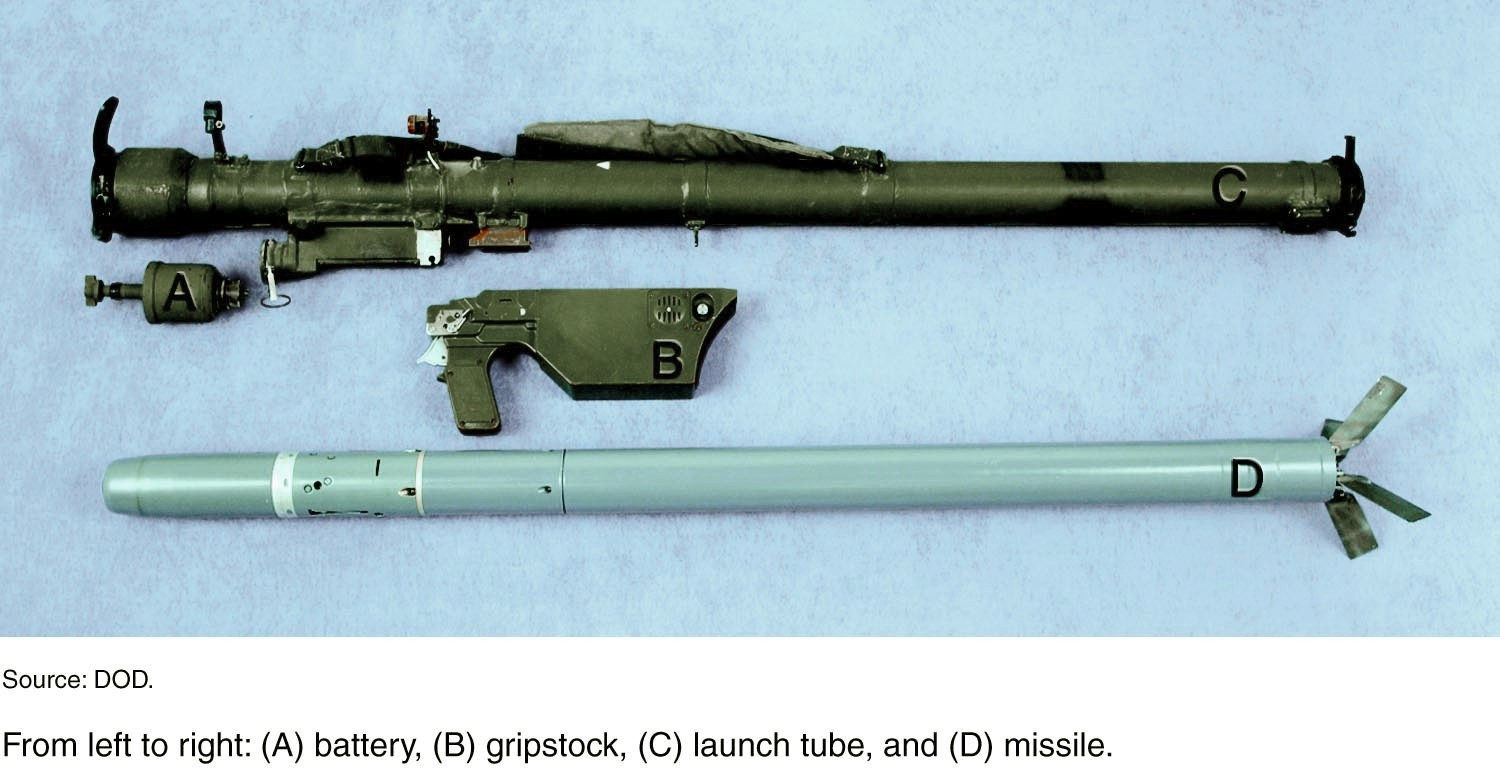
Components of the most common variant, the 9K32M Strela-2M/SA-7b

As the modifications introduced with the Strela-2M were relatively minor, the process was fast and it was accepted in service in 1970. The Strela-2M replaced the Strela-2 in production lines immediately. Improvements were made particularly to increase the engagement envelope of the new system:

- Higher thrust propellant increased slant range from 3.4 to 4.2 km (2.1 to 2.6 mi) and ceiling from 1.5 to 2.3 km (0.93 to 1.43 mi)
- Improved guidance and control logic allowed the engagement of helicopters and propeller-driven aircraft (but not jets) approaching at a maximum speed of 150 m/s (490 ft/s; 340 mph)
- Maximum speed of receding targets was increased from 220 to 260 m/s (720 to 850 ft/s; 490 to 580 mph)
- More automated gripstock provided a simplified firing method against fast targets: a single trigger pull followed by lead and superelevation replacing the separate stages of releasing the seeker to track, and launching the missile (see description below)

Contrary to what was initially reported in some Western publications, more recent information indicates that, while lethality on impact had proven to be a problem, the warhead remained the same 1.17 kg (2.6 lb) unit (including 370-gram (13 oz) TNT charge) as in the original. This remained the warhead of all Soviet MANPADS up to and including most 9K38 Igla variants; to address the problem of poor lethality, a more powerful HE filling than TNT, improved fuzing, a terminal maneuver, and finally a separate charge to set off any remaining rocket fuel were gradually introduced in later MANPADS systems, but the original Strela-2/2M warhead design of a 370-gram (13 oz) directed-energy HE charge in a pre-fragmented casing remained.

The seeker head improvements were only minor changes to allow better discrimination of the target signal against background emissions. Some sources claim that the seeker sensitivity was also improved. The only defence against infra-red countermeasures remained the seeker head's narrow field of view, which could be hoped to help the rapidly slowing flare fall off the missile field of view as it was tracking a fast-moving target. In practice, flares proved to be a highly effective countermeasure against both versions of the Strela-2.

The seeker is commonly referred to as a hot metal tracker. The seeker can only see infrared energy in the near infrared (NIR) spectrum, emitted by very hot surfaces only seen on the inside of the jet nozzle. This allows only rear-aspect engagement of jet targets, earning the weapon its other moniker as a revenge weapon, since the missile has to "chase" an aircraft after it has already passed by.

The Strela-2M was also procured for use on-board Warsaw Pact warships; installed on four-round pedestal mounts aboard Soviet amphibious warfare vessels and various smaller combatants, the weapon remained unchanged, but was assigned the NATO reporting name SA-N-5 "Grail".

== Description ==
The missile launcher system consists of the green missile launch tube containing the missile, a grip stock and a cylindrical thermal battery. The launch tube is reloadable at depot, but missile rounds are delivered to fire units in their launch tubes. The device can be reloaded up to five times.

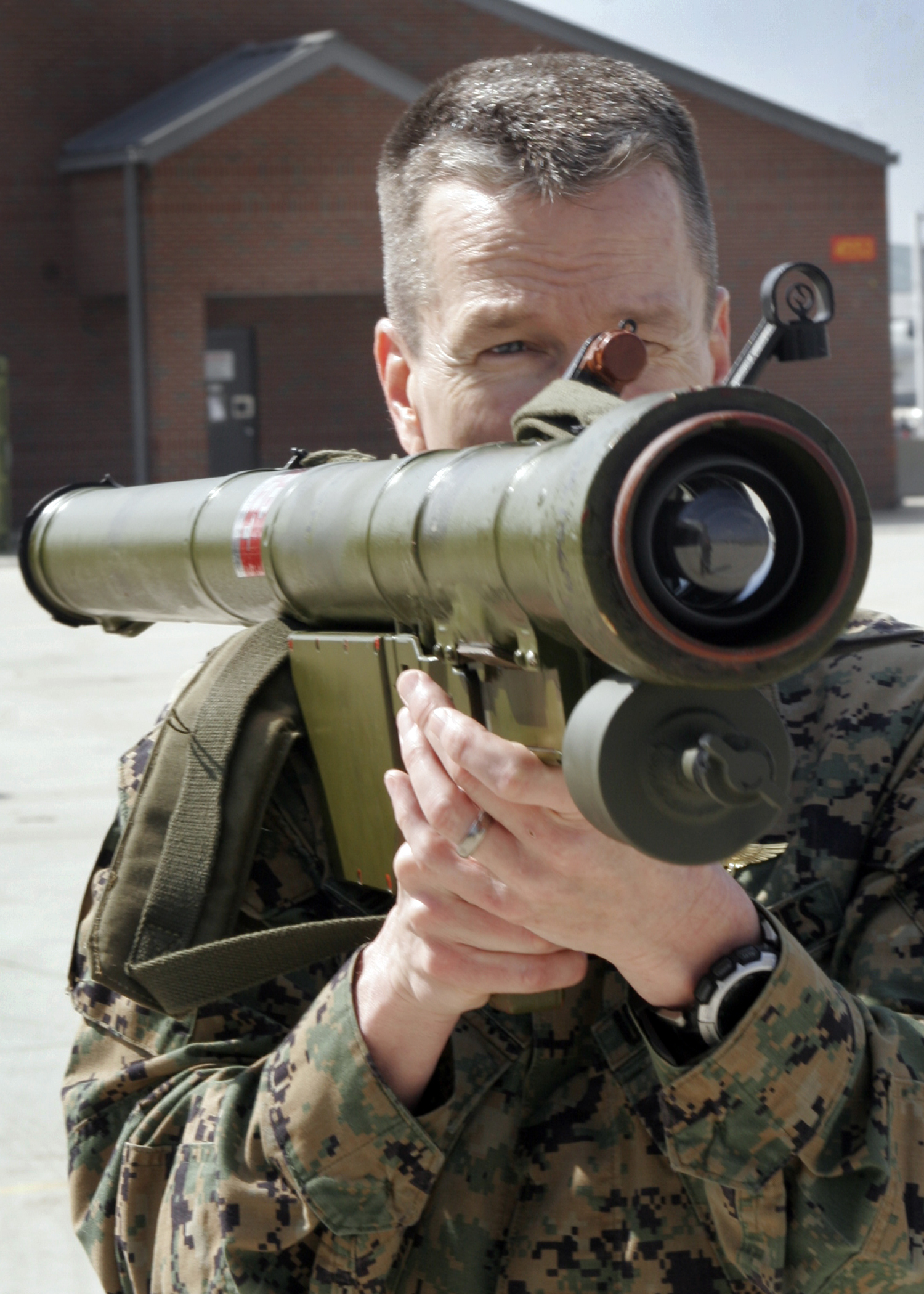
An inert Strela being aimed by a US Marine during training, the lens of the seeker clearly visible

When engaging slow or straight-receding targets, the operator tracks the target with the iron sights in the launch tube and applies half-trigger. This action "uncages" the seeker and allows its attempt to track. If a target IR signature can be tracked against the background present, this is indicated by a light and a buzzer sound. The shooter then pulls the trigger fully, and immediately applies lead and superelevation. This method is called a manual engagement. An automatic mode, which is used against fast targets, allows the shooter to fully depress the trigger in one pull followed by immediate lead and superelevation of the launch tube. The seeker will uncage and will automatically launch the missile if a strong enough signal is detected.

The manufacturer lists reaction time measured from the carrying position (missile carried on a soldier's back with protective covers) to missile launch to be 13 seconds, a figure that is achievable but requires considerable training and skill in missile handling. With the launcher on the shoulder, covers removed and sights extended, reaction time from fire command to launch reduces to 6–10 seconds, depending greatly on the target difficulty and the shooter's skill.

After activating the power supply to the missile electronics, the gunner waits for electricity supply and gyros to stabilize, puts the sights on target and tracks it smoothly with the launch tube's iron sights, and pulls the trigger on the grip stock. This activates the seeker electronics and the missile attempts to lock onto the target. If the target is producing a strong enough signal and the angular tracking rate is within acceptable launch parameters, the missile alerts the gunner that the target is locked on by illuminating a light in the sight mechanism, and producing a constant buzzing noise. The operator then has 0.8 seconds to provide lead to the target while the missile's on-board power supply is activated and the throw-out motor ignited.

Should the target be outside acceptable parameters, then the light cue in the sight and the buzzer signal tell the gunner to re-aim the missile.

On launch, the booster burns out before the missile leaves the launch tube at 32 m/s (100 ft/s) and rotating at around 20 revolutions per second. As the missile leaves the tube, the two forward steering fins unfold, as do the four rear stabilizing tail fins. The self-destruct mechanism is then armed, which is set to destroy the missile after between 14 and 17 seconds to prevent it hitting the ground if it should miss the target.

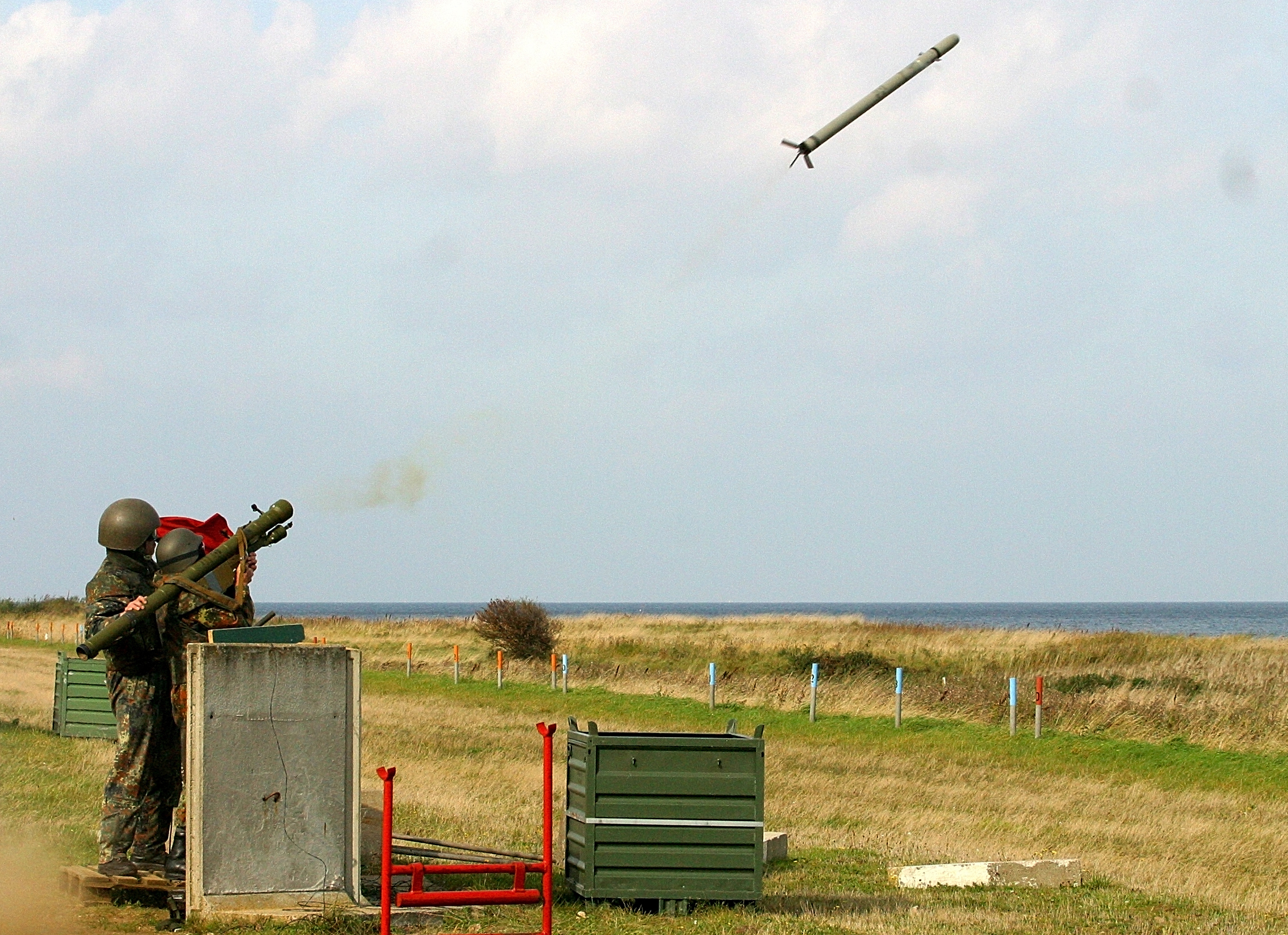
German troops fire a Strela during training, 2004. The missile's fins have unfurled and the sustainer motor is about to activate

Once the missile is five and a half meters away from the gunner, about 0.3 seconds after leaving the launch tube, it activates the rocket sustainer motor. The sustainer motor takes it to a velocity of 430 metres per second (1,400 ft/s; 960 mph), and sustains it at this speed. Once it reaches peak speed, at a distance of around 120 metres (390 ft) from the gunner, the final safety mechanism is disabled and the missile is fully armed. All told, the booster burns for 0.5 seconds and the driving engine for another 2.0 seconds.

The missile's uncooled lead sulfide passive infra-red seeker head detects infrared radiation at below 2.8 μm in wavelength. It has a 1.9 degree field of view and can track at 9 degrees per second. The seeker head tracks the target with an amplitude-modulated spinning reticle (spin-scan or AM tracking), which attempts to keep the seeker constantly pointed towards the target. The spinning reticle measures the amount of incoming infrared (IR) energy. It does this by using a circular pattern that has solid portions and slats that allow the IR energy to pass through to the seeker. As the reticle spins IR energy passes through the open portions of the reticle. Based on where the IR energy falls on the reticle the amount or amplitude of IR energy allowed through to the seeker increases the closer to the center of the reticle. Therefore, the seeker is able to identify where the center of the IR energy is. If the seeker detects a decrease in the amplitude of the IR energy it steers the missile back towards where the IR energy was the strongest. The seeker's design creates a dead-space in the middle of the reticle. The center mounted reticle has no detection capability. This means that as the seeker tracks a target as soon as the seeker is dead center, (aimed directly at the IR source) there is a decrease in the amplitude of IR energy. The seeker interprets this decrease as being off target so it changes direction. This causes the missile to move off target until another decrease in IR energy is detected and the process repeats itself. This gives the missile a very noticeable wobble in flight as the seeker bounces in and out from the dead-space. This wobble becomes more pronounced as the missile closes on the target as the IR energy fills a greater portion of the reticle. These continuous course corrections effectively bleed energy from the missile reducing its range and velocity.

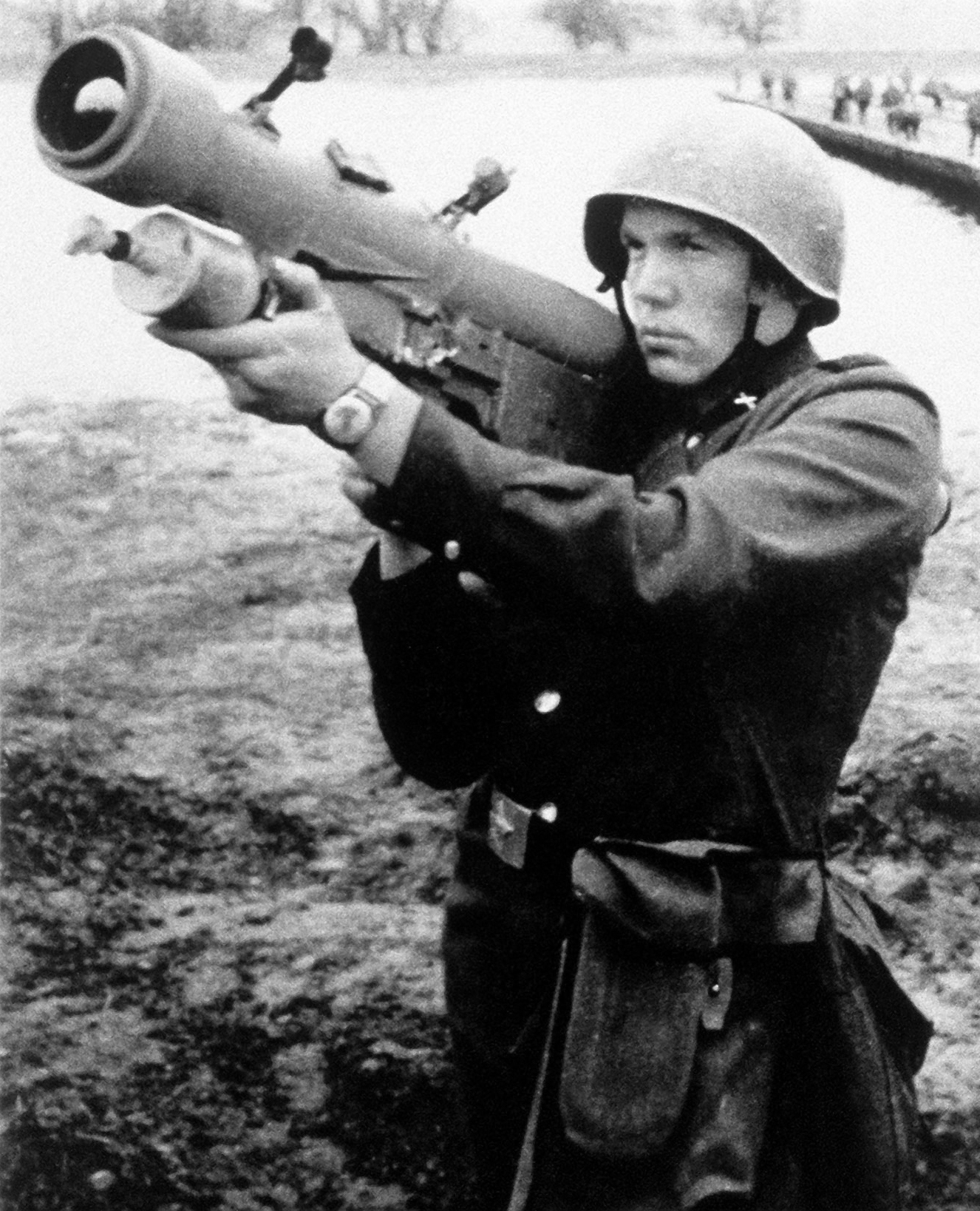
A Soviet soldier posing with a Strela launcher

The guidance of the SA-7 follows proportional convergence logic, also known as angle rate tracking system or pro-logic. In this method, as the seeker tracks the target, the missile is turned towards where the seeker is turning towards – not where it is pointing at – relative to the missile's longitudinal axis. Against a target flying in a straight-line course at constant speed, the angle rate of seeker-to-body reduces to zero when the missile is in a straight-line flight path to intercept point.

== Combat use ==
As a consequence of their widespread availability and large numbers, the Strela system has seen use in conflicts across the globe.

=== Middle East ===
==== Egypt ====
The first combat use of the missile is credited as being in 1969 during the War of Attrition by Egyptian soldiers. The first "kill" was claimed on 19 August 1969. An Israeli 102 Squadron A-4H Skyhawk was hit with a shoulder-fired missile 19 km (12 mi) west of the Suez Canal and pilot SqL Nassim Ezer Ashkenazi captured. Between this first firing and June 1970 the Egyptian army fired 99 missiles resulting in 36 hits. The missile proved to have poor kinematic reach against combat jets, and also poor lethality as many aircraft that were hit managed to return safely to base.

The missile was used later in the Yom Kippur War, where 4,356 Strelas were fired, scoring few hits and just 2 to 4 kills, with 26 to 28 damaged. A-4s were fitted with lengthened exhaust pipes in order to prevent fatal damage to the engine, a solution made in the previous war, together with flare launchers. However, together with Shilka and SA-2/3/6s, they caused very heavy losses to the Israeli Air Force in the first days. Subsequently, Arab forces fired so many SAMs that they almost depleted their weapon stocks. SA-7s were not that effective against fast jets, but they were the best weapon available to Arab infantry at the time.

A Strela 2 was reportedly used by the Islamist militant group Ansar Bait al-Maqdis to destroy an Egyptian military Mil-8 helicopter operating in the northern Sinai region on 26 January 2014 near Sheikh Zuweid (close to the border with Gaza), killing its five occupants. This is the first attack of this type during the Sinai insurgency, which has raged on the peninsula due to the security and political turmoil since the 2011 revolution. The MANPADS is reported by United Nations to have come from former Libyan leader Muammar Gaddafi's large stocks, which have been widely proliferated after Libya's civil war chaos and have become a concern to regional and world security.

==== Syria ====
The Strela was deployed by Syrian forces occupying Lebanon, along with other Soviet air-defence systems that challenged U.S., French and Israeli airpower in the aftermath of the 1982 conflict and the deployment of the Multinational Force in Lebanon during that year. On 10 November 1983, an SA-7 was fired at a French Super Etendard near Bourj el-Barajneh while flying over Druze People's Liberation Army (PLA) positions. On 3 December, more Strelas and anti-aircraft artillery (AAA) were fired at United States Navy F-14 Tomcats flying a reconnaissance mission.

The Americans responded with a large strike package of 12 A-7 Corsairs and 16 A-6 Intruders (supported by a single E-2C Hawkeye, two EA-6B Prowlers and two F-14As) launched from the carriers USS John F. Kennedy (CV-67) and USS Independence (CV-62) sailing in the Mediterranean. The aircraft were to bomb Syrian installations, AAA sites and weapons depots near Falouga and Hammana, some 16 km (10 mi) north of Beirut-Damascus highway, when they were received by a volley of (possibly up to 40) Syrian SAMs, one of which hit a Corsair (AE305 of the VA-15), forcing the pilot to eject over the sea before being rescued by a USN search and rescue mission.

The attack formation broke, with each pilot attacking each objective on its own, leading to the downing of a second U.S. aircraft, an Intruder from VA-85, hit by either an SA-7 or an SA-9. The navigator, Lieutenant Bobby Goodman ejected near a village surrounded by Syrian positions. The pilot, Lt. Mark Lange, ejected too late and died from his wounds soon after being captured by Syrian soldiers and Lebanese civilians. Goodman was captured by the Syrians and taken to Damascus before being freed in January 1984.

A second Corsair, searching for the downed Intruder crew, was later hit by an SA-7. The pilot, Cdr. Edward Andrews, managed to eject over the sea near Beirut and was rescued by a fisherman and his son who in turn handed him over to the U.S Marines.

During the civil war, several Strelas have made their way to rebel hands, and YouTube videos have shown them being fired. In 2013, Foreign Policy, citing rebels sources, reported the shipment, with Qatari help, of some 120 SA-7s from Libya (with large stocks acquired by Gaddafi and proliferated after that country's civil war) through Turkey and with Turkish authorities' knowledge.

==== Lebanon ====
On 24 June 1974, Palestinian guerrillas operating in southern Lebanon fired two SA-7s against invading Israel Air Force (IAF) aircraft, though no hits were scored.

The Lebanese Al-Mourabitoun militia received either from Syria or the PLO a number of SA-7s, which they employed against Israeli Air Force (IAF) fighter-bomber jets during the 1982 Lebanon War.

During the 1983–84 Mountain War, the Druze People's Liberation Army (PLA) militia received from Syria a number of Strela missiles, which were used to bring down two Lebanese Air Force Hawker Hunter fighter jets and one Israeli IAI Kfir fighter-bomber aircraft, on 20 November over the mountainous Chouf district southeast of Beirut (the pilot was rescued by the Lebanese Army). The Christian Maronite Lebanese Forces militia (LF) also received from Iraq a number of Strela missiles in 1988–89.

The Shiite Hezbollah guerrilla group also acquired some Strelas in the late 1980s and fired them against Israeli aircraft in November 1991. Since then, they have fired many Strelas against Israeli aircraft, including two against Israeli warplanes on 12 June 2001 near Tyre, but have never scored a hit.

==== Iraq ====
In the early dawn of 31 January 1991 during the Battle of Khafji in Operation Desert Storm, an Iraqi soldier shot down an American AC-130H gunship with a Strela 2, killing all 14 crewmembers.

Strela-2 missiles have been used against Turkish Army helicopters by the PKK in northern Iraq. During Operation Hammer; on 18 May 1997, a Strela-2 missile was used to shoot down an AH-1W Super Cobra attack helicopter. On 4 June 1997, another Strela was used to bring down a Turkish Army AS-532UL Cougar transport helicopter in the Zakho area, killing the 11 soldiers on board. The video of the first attack was used extensively for PKK propaganda and eventually released to the Internet. Greece and Serbia's intelligence services, as well as Iran, Syria, Armenia, and Cyprus were traced as possible sources of the missiles.

A Strela-2 missile is said to have been used in April 2005, when members of the insurgents shot down an Mi-8 helicopter operated by Blackwater, killing all 11 crew members. The Islamic Army in Iraq took responsibility for the action and a video showing the downing was released on the Internet. The missile launcher is not visible on the video, however, making it impossible to confirm the type of MANPADS used.

The spate of helicopter shoot-downs during 2006 and 2007 in Iraq has been partly attributed to the prevalence of the Strela amongst Sunni insurgent groups of that time; while al Qaeda is said to have produced an hour-long training video on how to use SA-7s.

==== Saudi Arabia ====
In late 2001, a Sudanese man with links to Al-Qaida fired an SA-7 at an American F-15 Eagle fighter taking off from Prince Sultan Air Base in Saudi Arabia. The missile missed the target and was not detected by the pilot or anyone at the base. Saudi police found the empty launcher in the desert in May 2002, and a suspect was arrested in Sudan a month later. He led police to a cache in the desert where a second missile was buried.

==== Gaza ====
During October 2012, militants in Gaza fired a Strela at an IDF helicopter. During Operation Pillar of Defense, Hamas released a video purporting to be a Strela missile launch at an IAF target. In March 2013, one was also reportedly fired from Gaza at an IAF helicopter.

In October 2023, Hamas claimed to have used these missiles to down an IAF helicopter during the Gaza war.

==== Yemen ====
Al-Qaeda in the Arabian Peninsula allegedly shot down a UAE Mirage fighter jet with a Strela during the Yemeni Civil War (2014–present). Houthi rebels were seen carrying 9K32 Strela-2s.

=== Southeast Asia ===
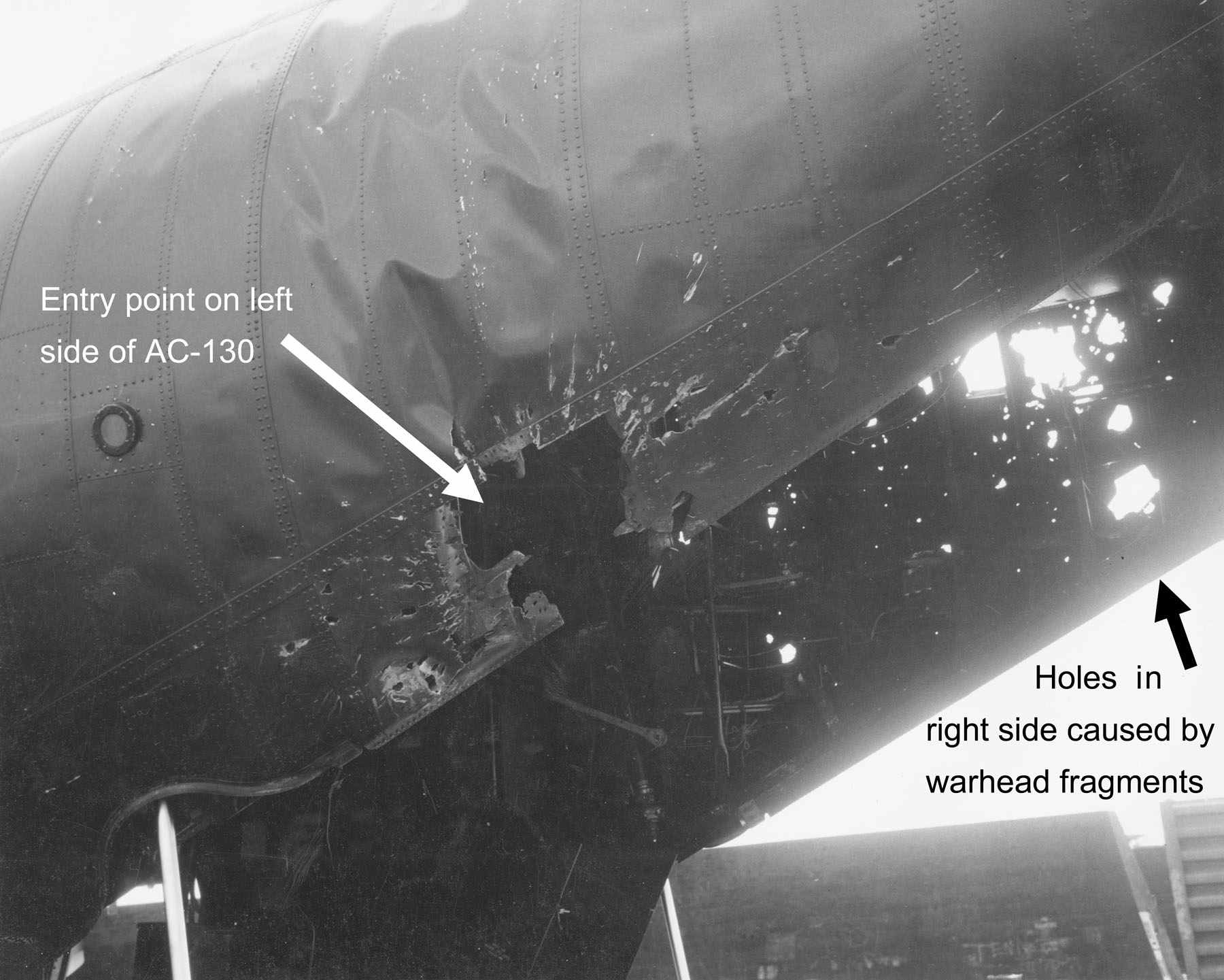
Damage to an AC-130 gunship caused by an SA-7, May 1972

The Strela-2 system was also given to North Vietnam, where along with the more advanced Strela-2M it achieved 204 hits out of 589 firings against US and South Vietnamese aircraft between 1972 and 1975 according to Russian sources. (Some sources, such as Fiszer (2004), claim that it was used from 1968 onwards).

Roughly 95–120 kills and several dozen damaged are attributed to Strela-2/2M hits between April 1972 and the Fall of Saigon in April 1975, almost all against helicopters and propeller-driven aircraft. As in the War of Attrition, the missile's speed and range proved insufficient against fast jets and results were poor: only one U.S. A-4 Skyhawk, one U.S. F-4 Phantom and three South Vietnamese F-5 Freedom Fighter are known to have been shot down with Strela-2s during the conflict.

U.S. fixed-wing losses are listed in the following table. The internet site Arms-expo.ru states 14 fixed-wing aircraft and 10 helicopters were shot down with 161 missile rounds used between 28 April and 14 July 1972. Between April 1972 and January 1973, 29 fixed-wing aircraft and 14 helicopters were shot down (01 F-4, 7 O-1, 03 O-2, 04 OV-10, 09 A-1, 04 A-37, 01 CH-47, 04 AH-1, 09 UH-1) The difference in fixed-wing losses may be at least partly due to South Vietnamese aircraft shot down by the weapon.

Date	Type	Unit	Altitude when hit		Casualties	Mission	Location
Date	Type	Unit	ft	m	Casualties	Mission	Location
1972-05-01	O-2A	20th TASS			0	FAC	Quang Tri
1972-05-01	A-1H	1 SOS	3,500	1,100	0	SAR	Quang Tri
1972-05-02	A-1E	1 SOS	5,500	1,700	0	SAR	Quang Tri
1972-05-02	A-1G	1 SOS	6,500	2,000	1 WIA	SAR	Quang Tri
1972-05-02	UH-1				5 KIA		Quang Tri
1972-05-11	AH-1				2 KIA		A Loc
1972-05-11	O-2				2 KIA		A Loc
1972-05-11	O-2				2 KIA		An Loc
1972-05-14	O-1		4,000	1,200	0	FAC	An Loc
1972-05-22	F-4				0		
1972-05-24	UH-1				4 KIA		Hue
1972-05-24	AH-1				2 KIA		An Loc
1972-05-25	OV-10				0		Hue
1972-05-26	TA-4F	H&MS-15	4,500	1,400	0	armed recce	Hue
1972-06-11	OH-6				2 KIA		Hue
1972-06-18	AC-130A	16 SOS			12 KIA	armed recce	A Shau
1972-06-20	AH-1				2 KIA		An Loc
1972-06-21	AH-1				0		An Loc
1972-06-29	OV-10A	20 TASS	6,500	2,000	1 KIA	FAC	Quang Tri
1972-07-02	O-1				0	FAC	Phum Long (Cambodia)
1972-07-05	A-37				0		Hue
1972-07-11	CH-53				46 KIA	Transport	Quang Tri
1972-10-31	CH-47				15 KIA		Sai Gon
1972-11-23	O-2				0		An Loc
1972-03-12	AH-1				0		
1972-12-19	OV-10A	20 TASS			1 KIA	FAC	Quang Tri
1973-01-08	UH-1				6 KIA		Quang Tri
1973-01-27	OV-10A	23 TASS	6,000	1,800	2 MIA	FAC	Quang Tri

The table shows heavy losses particularly in the beginning of May, with especially lethal results on the 1st and 2nd, where the shootdown of the O-2 FAC led to further losses when a rescue operation was attempted. After these initial losses, changes in tactics and widespread introduction of decoy flares helped to counter the threat, but a steady flow of attrition and necessity of minimizing time spent in the Strela's engagement envelope nonetheless continued to limit the effectiveness of US battlefield air operations until the end of US involvement in South-East Asia. The United States lost at least 10 AH-1 Cobras and several UH-1 Hueys to Strela-2/2M hits in South East Asia.

From 28 January 1973 to July 1973, the Republic of Vietnam Air Force lost 8 aircraft and helicopter with 22 missile rounds used (1 A-37, 3 A-1, 1 F-5, 2 UH-1, 1 CH-47) From January 1973 to December 1974, the Republic of Vietnam Air Force lost at least 28 planes and helicopters to Strela-2s.

In 1975 spring offensive, a few dozen aircraft and helicopter were shot down by SA-7s. On 14 April, one F-5 was shot down In Ho Chi Minh campaign, PAVN claimed 34 aircraft and helicopter were shot down by SA-7s, including 9 on 29 April

Vietnam claims that throughout the war, PAVN gunner Hoàng Văn Quyết fired 30 missiles and shotdown 16 aircraft.

In the late 1980s, Strela-2s were used against Royal Thai Air Force aircraft by Laotian and Vietnamese forces during numerous border clashes. An RTAF F-5E was damaged on 4 March 1987 and another F-5E was shot down on 4 February 1988 near the Thai-Cambodian border.

=== Western Asia ===
==== Afghanistan ====
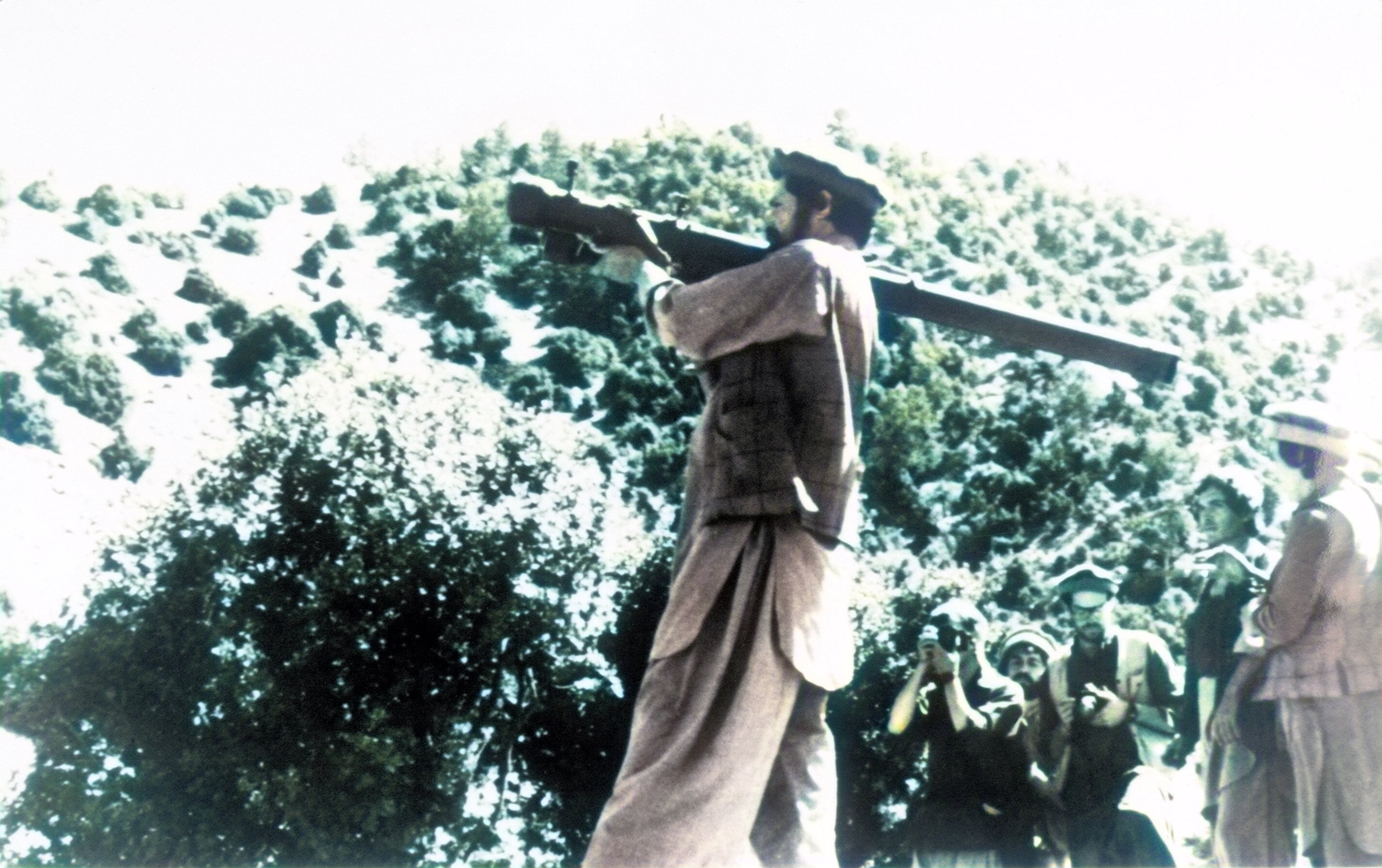
An Afghan Mujahid with a Strela 2, 1988

In 1977, the Republic of Afghanistan received the Strela-2M for use by the Afghan Army. The Strela-2M was used also in Afghanistan during the Soviet–Afghan War by the Mujahiddeen. The missiles were obtained from various sources, some from Egypt and China (locally manufactured Sakr Eye and HN-5 versions of the SAM), and the CIA also assisted the guerrillas in finding missiles from other sources.

Results from combat use were not dissimilar from experiences with the Strela-2/2M from Vietnam: while 42 helicopters were shot down by various Strela-2 variants (including a few Mi-24s until exhaust shrouds made them next to invisible to the short-wavelength Strela-2 seeker) only five fixed-wing aircraft were destroyed with the weapon. Due to its poor kinematic performance and vulnerability to even the most primitive infra-red countermeasures, the guerrillas considered the Strela-2 suitable for use against helicopters and prop-driven transports, but not combat jets.

However, the recent studies and interviews after the Cold war say that most Strelas sold to the Mujahiddeen on the black market were broken/damaged or faulty. This is possibly another reason why the Soviet army in Afghanistan didn't expect working anti-aircraft missiles like the Stinger to be used.

On 22 July 2007 the first reported attack of the Taliban against a coalition aircraft using MANPADS was reported. The weapon was reported to be an SA-7 allegedly smuggled from Iran to the Taliban. The missile failed after the crew of the USAF C-130, flying over the Nimroz province, launched flares and made evasive manoeuvers.

However, most of the Strelas operated by al-Qaeda in Afghanistan are probably inherited from fighters that used it during the Soviet invasion. Most are probably faulty, broken or in other ways not usable (even from the beginning) against military helicopters, with the intercepts of NATO aviation by Stingers (acquired also during 80s) or other missiles.

==== Chechnya ====
Chechen forces had access to old Soviet stockpiles of Strela-2M and Igla missiles, as well former Soviet Army personnel trained to operate them. In the First Chechen War, Russian forces lost about 38 aircraft of which 15 were caused by MANPADS with another 10 probably caused by MANPADS, while the rest were caused by other anti-aircraft weapons. During the Second Chechen War the Russians lost 45 helicopters and 8 fixed-wing aircraft—the majority presumably caused by MANPADS.

==== Georgia ====
The SA-7 saw heavy usage by all sides during the Georgian Civil War. The first known loss to an SA-7 happened on 13 June 1993, when a GAF Su-25 was shot down by a Strela over Shubara. On two later occasions, Georgian airliners (a Tu-134A and a Tu-134B) were shot down by SA-7s, killing a total of 110 people.

=== Africa ===
==== Guinea-Bissau ====
PAIGC rebels fighting for independence from Portugal began to receive SA-7s in early 1973, a development that immediately became a threat to Portuguese air supremacy. On 23 March 1973, two Portuguese Air Force (FAP) Fiat G.91s were shot down by SA-7s, followed six weeks later by another Fiat, and a Dornier Do 27.

==== Mozambique ====
FRELIMO fighters in Mozambique were also able to field some SA-7s with Chinese support, although the weapon is not known to have caused any losses to the FAP, even if it forced Portuguese pilots to change their tactics. In one case a Douglas DC-3 carrying foreign military attaches and members of the senior Portuguese military command was hit by an SA-7 in one of the engines. The crippled plane managed to land safely and was later repaired.

==== Angola ====
In Angola and Namibia, SA-7s were deployed against the South African Air Force with limited success. The SAAF lost Atlas Impalas to Strelas on 24 January 1980 and 10 October 1980. Another Impala was hit by an SA-7 on 23 December 1983, but the pilot was able to fly the aircraft back to Ondangwa AB. UNITA also reportedly obtained 50 SA-7s that Israel had captured, via the CIA. The first one was fired at Cuban aircraft by a French mercenary on 13 March 1976, but the missile failed to hit the target. The individual missiles may have been in poor condition, as none scored a direct hit. Additionally, it is claimed that UNITA used SA-7s to shoot down two Transafrik International Lockheed L-100-30 Hercules flying UN charters, on 26 December 1998 and 2 January 1999, both near Huambo.

==== Sudan ====
Using an SA-7, the Sudan People's Liberation Army shot down a Sudan Airways Fokker F-27 Friendship 400M taking off from Malakal on 16 August 1986, killing all 60 on board. On 21 December 1989, an Aviation Sans Frontières Britten-Norman BN-2A-9 Islander (F-OGSM) was shot down by an SA-7 while taking off from Aweil Sudan, killing the four crew on board.

==== Western Sahara ====
The Polisario Front used SA-7s against the Royal Moroccan Air Force and Mauritanian Air Force during the Western Sahara War over the former Spanish colonies of the Spanish Sahara. The Mauritania Air Force lost a Britten-Norman Defender to a SA-7 fired by the Polisario on 29 December 1976. Between 1975 and 1991, the Royal Moroccan Air Force has lost several Northrop F-5A Freedom Fighters and Dassault Mirage F1s to SA-7s fired by the Polisario. In a case of mistaken identity, a Dornier 228 owned by the Alfred Wegener Institute for Polar and Marine Research was shot down over the Western Sahara near Dakhla on 24 February 1985. Two Dornier 228s named Polar 2 and Polar 3 were on a return flight to Germany following a South Pole expedition. After having taken off from Dakar, Senegal, en route to Arrecife, Canary Islands, flying 5 minutes behind Polar 2 and at a lower altitude of 2,700 m (9,000 ft), Polar 3 was shot down by a SA-7 fired by the Polisario. The crew of three was killed. In another incident, on 8 December 1988, two Douglas DC-7CFs flying at 3,400 m (11,000 ft) from Dakar, Senegal to Agadir, Morocco for a locust control mission there, had SA-7s fired at them by the Polisario. One aircraft, N284, was hit and lost one of its engines and part of a wing. This led to the aircraft crashing, killing the crew of five. The other aircraft, N90804, also was hit and lost an engine along with suffering other damage, but it was able to land safely at Sidi Ifni Morocco.

==== Airliner attacks ====
During the Rhodesian Bush War, members of the military wing of the Zimbabwe People's Revolutionary Army brought down two Vickers Viscount civilian airliners near Kariba; the first in September 1978, the second in February 1979. There was great loss of life in both instances as the flights were returning from a well known tourist attraction.

- Vickers Viscount, Flight RH825, 3 September 1978 – downed by a Strela missile near Kariba Dam. After initial impact, the pilot was able to make an emergency landing in a nearby field but the aircraft broke up on impact. Eighteen of the fifty-six passengers in the tail section survived the crash. Ten of these survivors were shot dead at the crash-site by insurgents, who later looted the bodies and wreckage.
- Vickers Viscount, Flight RH827, 12 February 1979 – shot by down Strela missile near Kariba Dam; all 59 people on board were killed.

UNITA claimed that they used one to shoot down a TAAG Boeing 737-2M2 taking off from Lubango on 8 November 1983. A Lignes Aériennes Congolaises Boeing 727-30 taking off from Kindu was shot down by an SA-7 fired by rebel forces in 1998, killing all 41 on board. Two missiles were fired at a Boeing 757 during the 2002 Mombasa attacks in Kenya. Neither missile struck its target.

=== Latin America ===
==== Argentina ====
Strela-2M missiles were available to Argentinian troops in the Falkland Islands during the Falklands War. War Machine Encyclopedia shows no records of any launches, but several missiles were captured.

==== Nicaragua ====
The Strela-2 was used by both Sandinista government forces and US-backed Contra insurgents during the 1979–1990 civil war.

On 3 October 1983, at about 10:00 am, Sandinista soldier Fausto Palacios used a Strela to shoot down a Contra-operated Douglas DC-3 that had taken off from Catamacas airport in Honduras, carrying supplies, over the area of Los Cedros, in the Nueva Segovia Department. One crewman died in the crash and four were captured by government forces. The pilot, Major Roberto Amador Alvarez, as well as his co-pilot Capt. Hugo Reinaldo Aguilar were former members of the extinct National Guard of the former dictator Anastasio Somoza Debayle.

On 27 August 1984, Sandinista soldier Fanor Medina Leyton shot down a Contra-operated Douglas C-47 Skytrain with a Strela. Sources differ over the attack and crash area: both a Russian source and Sandinista officials reported the Jinotega Department, while the Aviation Safety Network reports the Quilalí area in the Nueva Segovia department. All eight occupants were killed. The pilot, José Luis Gutiérrez Lugo, was reported as a former pilot for the Somoza family. Sandinista and Contra forces subsequently battled for the control of six packages dropped from the plane.

On 5 October 1986 a Corporate Air Services C-123 Provider (HPF821, previously N4410F and USAF 54-679, (c/n 20128)) conducting a covert drop of arms to Contra fighters in Nicaragua was shot down by Sandinista soldier José Fernando Canales Alemán, using an SA-7. CIA pilots William J. Cooper and Wallace "Buzz" Sawyer as well as radio operator Freddy Vilches were killed in the crash. Loadmaster Eugene Hasenfus parachuted to safety and was taken prisoner. He was later released in December 1986. The flight had departed Ilopango Airport, El Salvador loaded with 70 Soviet-made AK-47 rifles and 100,000 rounds of ammunition, rocket grenades and other supplies.

On 15 June 1987, a Contra-operated Beechcraft Baron 56TC (reg. N666PF, msn. TG-60) was hit by Sandinista anti-aircraft fire over the Nueva Segovia Department. The (formerly civilian) light utility aircraft, which was removed from the US registry two years before, and was reportedly modified to carry rockets for use in an air-to-ground light strike role, was downed after an attack that reportedly included dropping leaflets and, possibly, reconnaissance. The aircraft crashed 6 km (4 mi) inside Honduras, in an area known as Cerro El Tigre and its three occupants, all former military elements of the Somoza dictatorship, were injured and captured after the crash landing and were treated in Honduras. The pilot, Juan Gomez, a former colonel in Somoza's National Guard was also reported to be the head of the Contra air force. A Russian source credits the Baron's downing to a Strela-2 fired from Murra by Sandinista soldier Jose Manuel Rodriguez.

==== El Salvador ====
FMLN rebels acquired SA-7 missiles around 1989 and employed them extensively in the closing years of the Salvadoran Civil War, dramatically increasing the combat losses of Salvadoran Air Force aircraft. At least two O-2 Skymasters (on 26 September and 19 November 1990), one A-37 Dragonfly (on 23 November 1990), two Hughes 500 helicopters (2 February and 18 May 1990), and two UH-1Hs were lost to SA-7s. One of the UH-1Hs (on 2 January 1991) was crewed by US Army personnel, while the other was operated by the Honduran Air Force.

==== Colombia ====
In late December 2012, a video showing FARC rebels attempting to shoot down a Colombian Air Force Arpía helicopter with an SA-7 in the Cauca raised the alarm in the Colombian military, though the missile failed. During that same month, a Strela was captured by the Colombian military. It is believed that they might came from Cuba, Nicaragua or Peru; the only Latin American operators of the type.

Furthermore, the CIA's motive to remove and destroy Chinese copies of the SA-7 (HN-5s) from Bolivia in 2005 was the fear of them reaching FARC rebels because, according to a US military magazine, "they used the HN-5 against Colombian-operated U.S-made helicopters". The Ecuadorian Army captured an HN-5 allegedly destined for the FARC in the border province of Sucumbíos, near Colombia, in July 2013.

=== Europe ===
==== Croatia ====
At the beginning of the Croatian War of Independence, the Croatian forces did not have an air force, and the anti-aircraft weapons they had at their disposal were more symbolic than dangerous for their opponents (about 25-30 light air defense systems Strela-2M). On September 19, 1991, the Croatian Air Defense shot down a J-22 Orao with the Strela-2M over the Đakovo area. The first Yugoslav aircraft shot down over the Adriatic Sea was the G-2 Galeb, which was hit by a Strela-2M by a police officer during the battle of Šibenik on September 20, 1991. A day later shooting down of two enemy aircraft in the same area in a short time, known by the cry "Both have fallen" occurred. On that day members of the Croatian Army during the Battle of the Dalmatian Channels shot down two J-21 Jastreb using M55 anti-aircraft gun and Strela 2M. On November 8, 1991. in Gorski Kotar, the Croatian air defense shot down MiG-21R with the Strela-2M. On April 24, 1992 during the siege of Dubrovnik an enemy aircraft was shot down with the Strela 2M.

==== Bosnia ====
The Army of Republika Srpska, backed by the Armed Forces of Serbia and Montenegro, used Strela-2M and upgraded Strela-2M/A missiles against Bosnian, Croatian, and NATO forces. On 3 September 1992, an Italian Air Force G.222 transport was presumably shot down by a Strela-2M during a United Nations relief mission near Sarajevo. Serbian forces shot down a Croatian Air Force MiG-21 in September 1993 with a Strela-2M. On 17 December 1994, a French Navy Dassault Étendard IVP was hit by a Strela-2M, but managed to return to its carrier.

During Operation Deliberate Force, NATO pilots were instructed to fly in medium altitudes to avoid Bosnian Serb MANPADS, such as the Strela-2 and the more modern Igla, although on 30 August 1995 a French Air Force Mirage 2000N was shot down by a Bosnian Serb MANPADS and its crew captured, the only aircraft lost during the campaign due hostile fire.

==== Northern Ireland ====
The Provisional Irish Republican Army (IRA) acquired some missiles from Libya. One was reported to have been fired at a British Army Air Corps Lynx helicopter in July 1991 in South Armagh; however, it missed its target. To counter the new threat, the British helicopters flew in pairs below 15 meters (50 feet) or above 150 meters (500 feet).

==== Spain ====
In 2001, the Basque separatist group ETA tried on three occasions (29 April, 4 and 11 May) to use Strela 2 missiles to shoot down the Dassault Falcon 900 aircraft with the then-Spanish Prime Minister Jose Maria Aznar on board. The attempts, which were made near the Fuenterrabía and Foronda airports, were unsuccessful as each time the missiles failed to launch. In 2004, several systems were captured by the Civil Guard. Some Strela 2 missiles were bought from the IRA in 1999, while Libya was tracked as the original source used by the IRA.

==== Ukraine ====
During the Russian invasion of Ukraine, Germany reversed its ban on weapon sales to provide Ukraine with military support. On 23 March 2022, German Foreign Minister Annalena Baerbock confirmed the delivery of 500 Strela-2 missiles which were part of former East German arsenals.

== Versions ==
- 9K32M Strela-2M: "SA-7b Grail"
- Fasta-4M: East German variant consisting of 4 Strela-2Ms mounted to a fully rotating turret. used by the NVA and Volksmarine
- Strela 2M/A: Yugoslav upgraded version with larger warhead
- CA-94 and CA-94M: Romanian license-built versions of the 9K32 and 9K32M, respectively
- HN-5: Chinese unlicensed copy
- Anza Mk-I: Pakistani version based on SA-7.
- Ayn al Saqr (عين الصقر; "Hawk Eye"): Egyptian copy
- Hwasung-Chong: North Korean license-built copy of Egyptian Ayn al Saqr system

== Operators ==
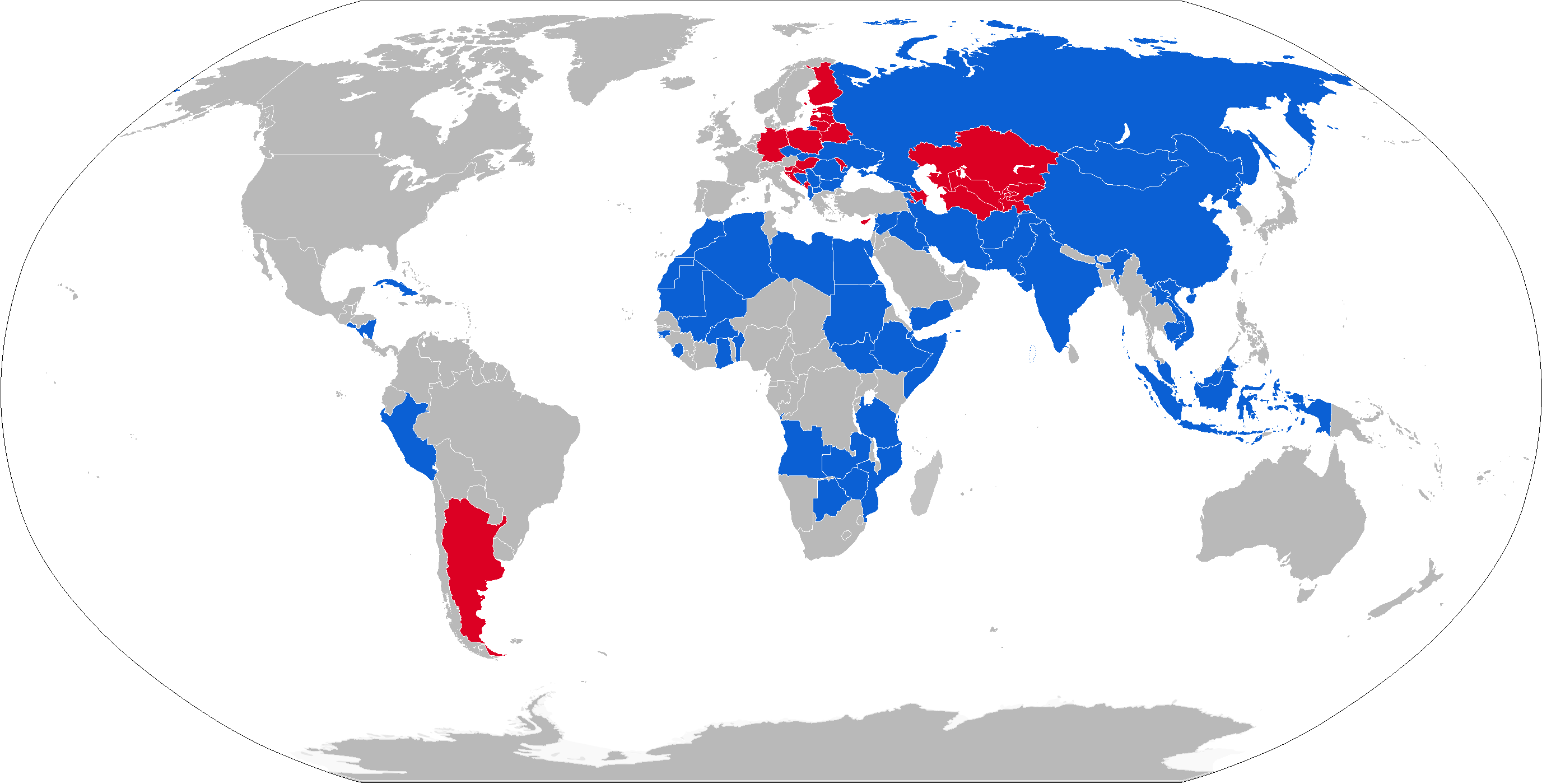
Operators Current Former

=== Current operators ===
- Al-Nasser Salah al-Deen Brigades
- Al-Qaeda in the Arabian Peninsula
- al-Qaeda in the Islamic Maghreb
- Al-Shabaab
- Algeria
- Alliance for National Resistance
- Angola
- Azerbaijan
- Benin
- Boko Haram
- Botswana
- Bulgaria license-built
- Burkina Faso
- Burundi
- Cambodia
- Cape Verde
- Chad
- Cuba
- Czech Republic
- Democratic Forces for the Liberation of Rwanda: 2 systems
- Democratic Republic of the Congo
- Ecuador
- Egypt
- El Salvador
- Eritrea
- Ethiopia
- Free Syrian Army
- Georgia
- Ghana
- Guinea
- Guinea-Bissau
- Guyana
- Hamas
- Popular Resistance Committees
- Hezbollah
- Hizbul Mujahideen
- Houthis
- India
- Indonesia
- Iran
- Islamic State
- Ivory Coast
- Jaish al-Islam
- Kazakhstan
- Kurdistan
- Kurdistan Workers' Party (PKK)
- Kuwait
- Kyrgyzstan
- Laos
- Lebanon
- Libya
- Lord's Resistance Army
- Mali
- March 23 Movement
- Mauritania
- Mauritius
- Moldova
- Mongolia
- Morocco
- Mozambique
- Namibia
- New People's Army
- Nicaragua
- Nigeria
- North Korea
- Oman
- Pakistan (locally built Anza Mk-1)
- Palestinian Islamic Jihad (also known as al-Quds Brigades)
- Peru
- Popular Defense Forces
- Popular Front for the Liberation of Palestine - General Command
- Popular Front for the Rebirth of Central African Republic (FPRC)
- Popular Mobilization Units
- Qatar
- Rally of Democratic Forces
- Rapid Support Forces
- Romania
- Russia
- Rwanda
- Sahrawi Arab Democratic Republic
- Serbia
- Seychelles
- Sierra Leone
- Slovakia
- Somalia
- Somaliland
- South Sudan
- South Sudan Liberation Movement
- Sudan
- Sudan Revolutionary Front
- Syria
- Tajikistan
- Tanzania
- Tunisia
- Turkmenistan
- Uganda
- Ukraine
- United Arab Emirates
- United Wa State Army
- Uzbekistan
- Vietnam
- Yemen
- Zambia
- Zimbabwe

=== Former operators ===
- Afghanistan
- Afghan Mujahideen
- African National Congress
- Ahlu Sunna Waljama'a
- Ansar al-Islam
- Ansar al-Sharia (Libya)
- Argentina
- Armed Forces Revolutionary Council
- Army of Republika Srpska
- Army of the Republic of Serb Krajina
- Al-Mourabitoun
- Belarus: Phased out from active service. 29 disposed of
- Black September Organization
- Bosnia and Herzegovina
- Caucasus Emirate
- Chadian Union of Forces for Democracy and Development
- Chechen Republic of Ichkeria
- (Mali) CNRDR
- Contras
- Croatia
- Cyprus
- Czechoslovakia
- East Germany
- ETA
- FAN
- Farabundo Martí National Liberation Front (FMLN)
- FARC
- Finland: Strela-2M operated under designation 'ItO-78'
- Frelimo
- Germany: Former East German stocks. 2,700 Strela-2s were donated to Ukraine in response to the 2022 Russian invasion
- Harkat ul-Ansar
- Hungary
- Iraq
- Islamic Army in Iraq
- Islamic Courts Union
- Islamic State in Libya
- Islamic State – Sinai Province
- Jaish al-Haramoun
- Jamiat-e Islami
- Jordan
- Jumbish-e-Mili
- Justice and Equality Movement
- Khmer People's National Liberation Front
- Khmer Rouge
- Kosovo Liberation Army
- Kurdistan Democratic Party
- Kuwait
- Latvia: 5 Strela 2M in 2008
- Lebanese Forces
- Liberation Tigers of Tamil Eelam
- Liberians United for Reconciliation and Democracy
- Moro National Liberation Front
- Mozambique National Resistance
- Movement for Oneness and Jihad in West Africa
- Mujahideen Shura Council of Derna
- National Congress for the Defense of the Congolese People
- National Liberation Army (Macedonia)
- National Liberation Movement (Albania)
- National Redemption Front
- Niger Movement for Justice
- North Macedonia: 54 in 2008
- North Vietnam
- National Movement for the Liberation of Azawad
- North Yemen
- PAIGC
- Palestinian Authority
- Palestine Liberation Organization factions in Lebanon; likely As-Sa'iqa
- Patriotic Movement of Côte d'Ivoire
- People's Armed Forces of Liberation of Angola
- People's Liberation Army (Lebanon)
- People's Movement for the Liberation of Angola
- Poland: Used until 2018
- Popular Front for the Liberation of the Occupied Arabian Gulf
- Provisional Irish Republican Army
- Republic of the Congo
- Revolutionary United Front
- Salafist Group for Preaching and Combat
- Sandinista National Liberation Front
- São Tomé and Príncipe
- Shan State Army
- Slovenia
- Somali National Alliance
- Somali Salvation Alliance
- South Africa
- South Yemen
- Soviet Union
- Sudan People's Liberation Army: Incorporated into the South Sudan government
- Tahrir al-Sham
- UNITA
- Viet Cong
- White mercenaries in the Congo
- Yugoslavia
- Zimbabwe People's Revolutionary Army

== Bibliography ==
- Cullen, Tony; Foss, Christopher F., eds. (1992). Jane's Land-Based Air Defence 1992–93 (5th ed.). Coulsdon, UK: Jane's Data Division. ISBN 0-7106-0979-5.
- Zaloga, Steven J. (19 January 2023). Infantry Antiaircraft Missiles: Man-Portable Air Defense Systems. Bloomsbury Publishing. ISBN 978-1-4728-5345-5.
