= Doris Abele =

German marine biologist

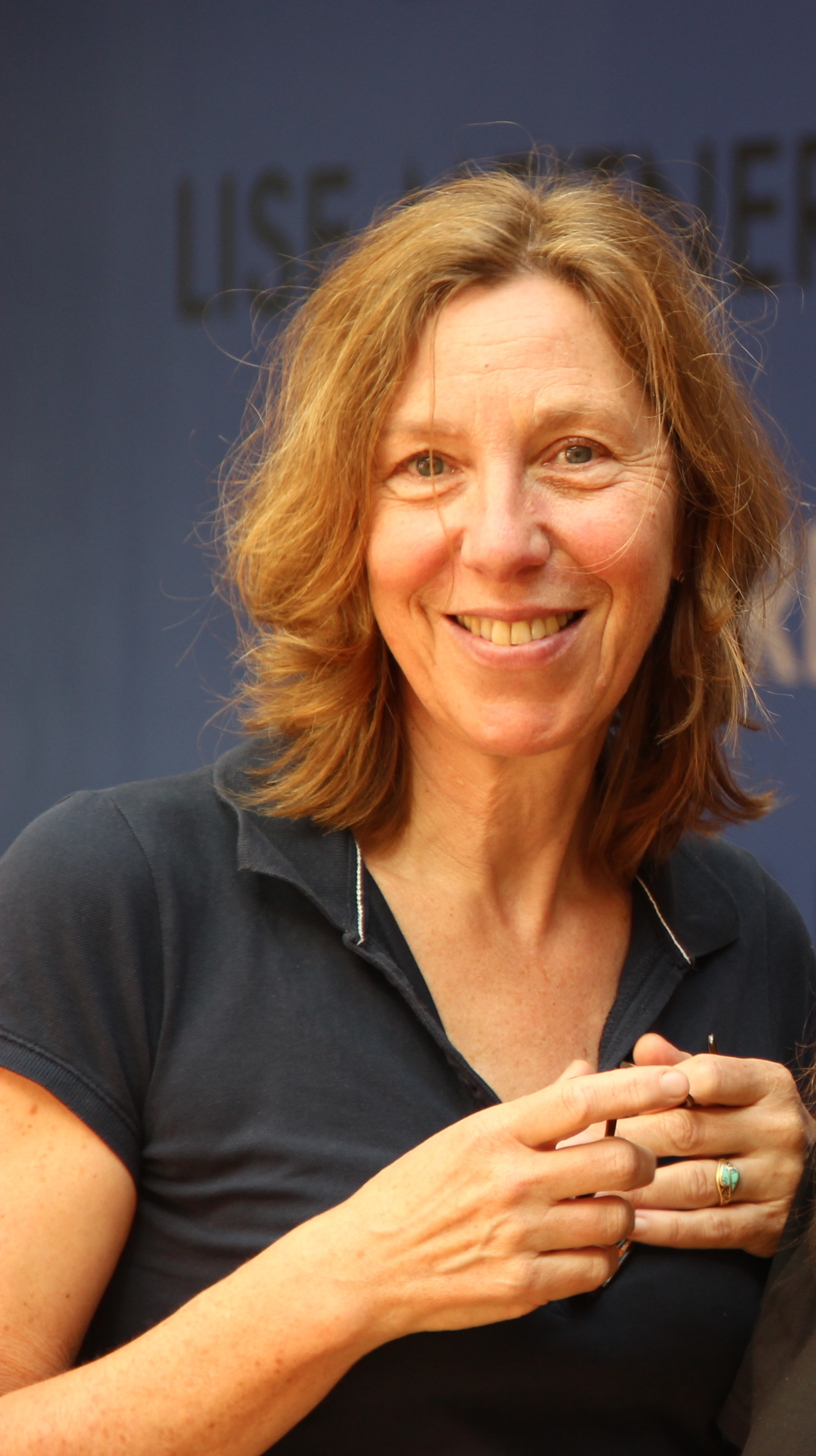
- Education: Düsseldorf University
- Scientific career
- Fields: Marine biology
- Workplaces: Alfred Wegener Institute

Doris Abele (June 22, 1957 – 2021) was an Antarctic marine biologist based at the Alfred Wegener Institute (AWI) in Germany. She led the research group working on stress physiology and aging in marine invertebrates and also the Ecology Polar regions And Coasts in the changing Earth System (PACES) programme.

== Early life and education ==
Abele received her Diploma in Biology from Düsseldorf University in 1984, followed by a PhD in marine biology and biochemistry in 1988. She worked as a postdoctoral researcher at the University of Bremen in 1989 where she specialised in oxygen radical research.

== Career and impact ==
Abele's research interests lay in physiological ageing in ectotherms, the evolution of genes and genomes, the impact of climatic changes on Antarctic coastal benthos, and HIF-1 homologs in marine organisms. In addition to her scientific papers, she has also published university course material as well as books.

From 2007 to 2009 she coordinated the IPY_ClicOPEN project of Climate Change Effects on Coastal Ecosystems at the Antarctic Peninsula. From 2011 to 2013 she coordinated the IMCOAST project Impact of climate change on Antarctic Coastal Ecosystems. From 2013 to 2016 she served as the role of coordinator as part of the Network for Staff Exchange and Training at IMCONet on the Interdisciplinary Modelling of climate change in Coastal Western Antarctica.

Abele has led 9 expeditions to the Carlini station, King George Island, Antarctica (to work in the Dallmann Laboratory). She leads the international ESF (European Social Fund) Programme, IMCOAST (Impact of Climate Change on Antarctic Coastal Systems: 2010–2016). While in the employ of AWI Abele has collaborated extensively with the British Antarctic Survey. She is the coordinator for MCONet - Interdisciplinary Modelling of Climate Change in Coastal Western Antarctica – Network for Staff Exchange and Training. In addition to her research, she also lectures at the University of Bremen.

== Selected works ==
- Husmann, G.; Philipp, E. R.; Abele, D. (2016). "Seasonal proliferation rates and the capacity to express genes involved in cell cycling and maintenance in response to seasonal and experimental food shortage in Laternula elliptica from King George Island". Marine Environmental Research. 118: 57–68. Bibcode:2016MarER.118...57H. doi:10.1016/j.marenvres.2016.05.003. PMID 27180267.
- Sahade, R.; Lagger, C.; Torre, L.; Momo, F.; Monien, P.; Schloss, I.; Barnes, D.K.B.; Servetto, N.; Tarantelli, S.; Tatián, M.; Zamboni, N.; Abele, D. (2015). "Climate change and glacier retreat drive shifts in an Antarctic benthic ecosystem". Science Advances. 1 (10) e1500050. Bibcode:2015SciA....1E0050S. doi:10.1126/sciadv.1500050. PMC 4681327. PMID 26702429.
- Bers, A.V.; Momo, F.; Schloss, I.; Abele, D. (2013). "Analysis of trends and sudden changes in environmental long-term data from King George Island (Antarctica): Relationships between global climatic oscillations and local system response" (PDF). Climatic Change. 116: 789–803. doi:10.1007/s10584-012-0523-4. S2CID 55208668.
- Schloss, I.R.; Abele, D.; Moreau, S.; Demers, S.; Bers, A.V.; González, O.; Ferreyra, G. A. (2012). "Response of Potter Cove phytoplankton dynamics to 19 year (1991-2009) climate trends". Journal of Marine Systems. 92 (1): 53–66. Bibcode:2012JMS....92...53S. doi:10.1016/j.jmarsys.2011.10.006.

== Awards and honors ==
Abele received the Biomaris (Biomaris Research Prize for Promoting Marine Sciences in the Federal State of Bremen) Award of the state of Bremen in 2013.
