= Allison Fong =

American oceanographer

- Born: Rhode Island
- Education: University of Hawaii Manoa
- Occupation: Oceanographer
- Employer: Alfred Wegener Institute for Polar and Marine Research

Allison Fong is an American oceanographer and polar biologist who is best known for her research into phytoplankton within the Arctic. She is currently a researcher for the Alfred Wegener Institute for Polar and Marine Research.

== Early life and education ==
Fong grew up along the coast in Rhode Island. She earned her graduate degree from the University of Hawaii Manoa.

== Career ==
From 2011 to 2014, Fong served on board of directors for Association for the Sciences of Limnology and Oceanography. From 2016 to 2018, she was a member of the International Arctic Science Committee's marine working group. She is currently a researcher for the Alfred Wegener Institute for Polar and Marine Research.

Fong was the leader of the ecology team for the 2019-2020 MOSAiC Expedition to the central Arctic. She studied phytoplankton and other algae to determine how they are able to survive in the absence of light under the polar ice. The expedition and Fong's research was interrupted by the COVID-19 pandemic when researchers were unable to return after the outbreak. In total, Fong spent nine months at sea during the expedition.

In 2026, Fong appeared in the National Geographic documentary Pole to Pole with Will Smith. Smith dived below polar ice with Fong to assist in collecting microbial samples. Fong cites the importance of studying sea ice algae as "fundamental to the habitability of Earth".

== Awards and honors ==
Fong was a finalist for the 2024 Frederik Paulsen Arctic Academic Action Award.
