= Hajo Eicken =

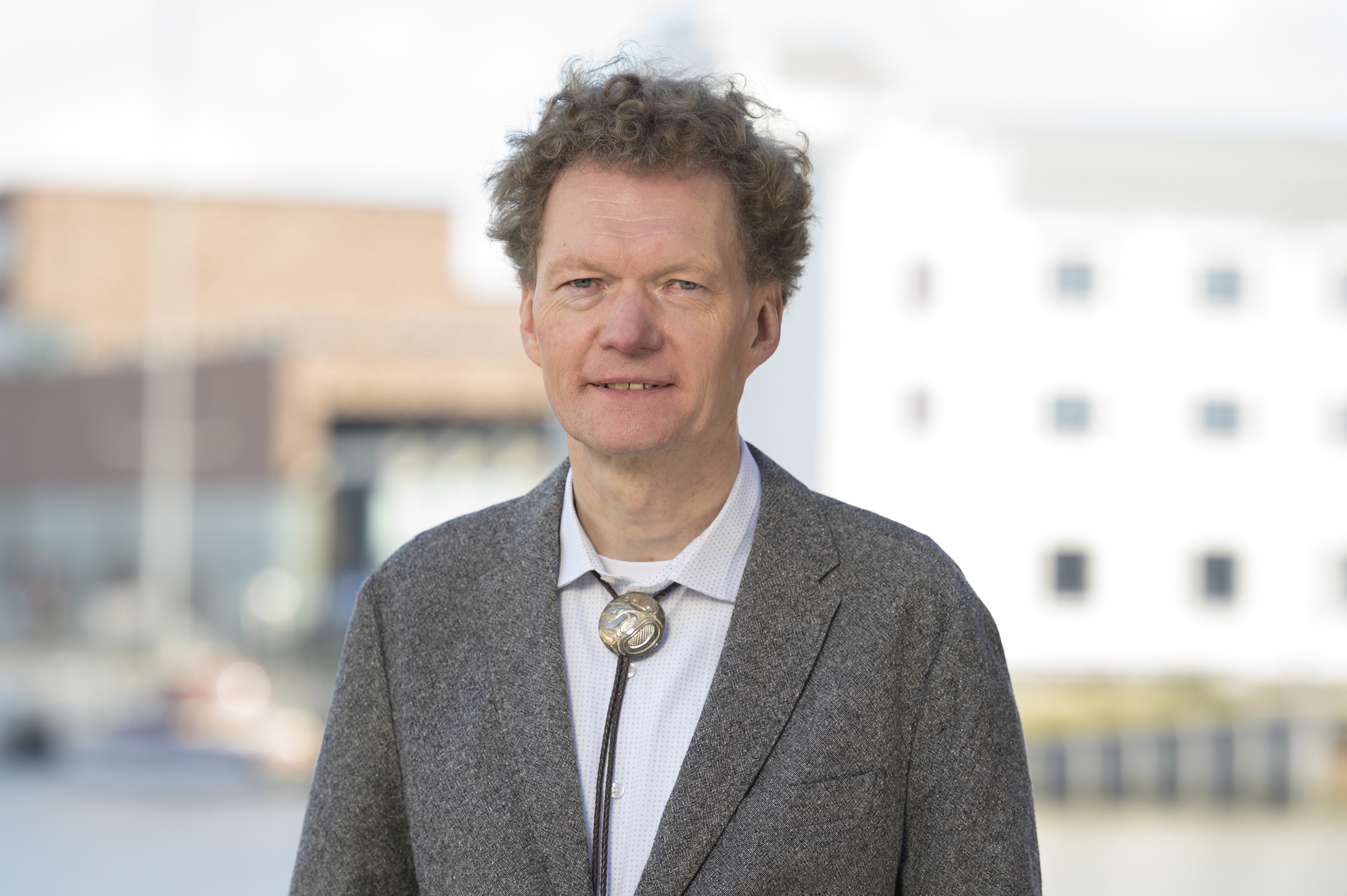
- Eicken in 2026
- Born: 1966 (age 59–60); Bremerhaven, West Germany
- Education: Clausthal University of Technology; University of Bremen
- Known for: Research on sea ice physics, ecology, and Arctic climate processes
- Scientific career
- Fields: Glaciology, sea ice research
- Workplaces: Alfred Wegener Institute; University of Alaska Fairbanks; International Arctic Research Center

Hajo Eicken (born 1966 in Bremerhaven, Germany) is a German glaciologist whose research focuses on sea ice and polar marine systems. He served as Director of the International Arctic Research Center at the University of Alaska Fairbanks from 2015 to 2026 and has been Director of the Alfred Wegener Institute (AWI) in Bremerhaven since 2026.

== Career ==
Eicken studied mineralogy at the Clausthal University of Technology, graduating with a Diplom degree in 1988. He received his doctorate from the University of Bremen in 1990. From 1990 to 1997, he worked at the Alfred Wegener Institute in the field of oceanic and atmospheric physics. In 1998, he joined the University of Alaska Fairbanks as a sea ice researcher at its Geophysical Institute.

From 2015 to 2026, Eicken served as Director of the International Arctic Research Center (IARC) at the University of Alaska Fairbanks. During his time in Alaska, he worked with Indigenous communities in northern Alaska and supported the integration of local and scientific knowledge in Arctic research and environmental monitoring. On 20 March 2026, he became Director of the Alfred Wegener Institute.

== Research ==
Eicken's research has focused on the role of sea ice as a physical, ecological, and biogeochemical component of polar marine systems. His work has examined the structure, growth, and dynamics of Antarctic and Arctic sea ice, its interactions with the ocean and atmosphere, and its influence on marine ecosystems. His early research on Antarctic sea ice explored links between sea-ice properties and marine ecosystems, highlighting the role of sea ice in shaping biological productivity and the distribution of ice-associated organisms. In a 1992 synthesis, he argued that sea ice acts as a key ecological structuring agent, creating distinct habitats and shaping biological interactions across Antarctic ecosystems.

His Arctic research has investigated meltwater transport, surface hydrology, and albedo evolution in summer sea ice. A 2002 study co-authored by Eicken examined pathways and rates of meltwater transport through Arctic summer sea ice using observations from the Surface Heat Budget of the Arctic Ocean (SHEBA) experiment. The study showed how meltwater was redistributed through and beneath the ice cover, including its retention in under-ice melt ponds beneath false bottoms, layers of underwater ice that form at the interface between freshwater and seawater. In a subsequent study, Eicken and colleagues examined how meltwater drainage and ponding processes influence the summer albedo of Arctic pack ice and its energy balance.

== Selected publications ==
- Eicken, H. (1991). Quantification of sea-ice properties: automated image analysis of thin sections and parameterization of chlorophyll and salinity distributions. Berichte zur Polarforschung (Reports on Polar Research), No. 82. Bremerhaven: Alfred Wegener Institute. 105 pp.
- Eicken, Hajo (1992). "The role of sea ice in structuring Antarctic ecosystems". Polar Biology. 12. Bibcode:1992PoBio..12....3E. doi:10.1007/BF00239960.
- Eicken, Hajo (1994). "Structure of under-ice melt ponds in the central Arctic and their effect on, the sea-ice cover". Limnology and Oceanography. 39 (3): 682–693. Bibcode:1994LimOc..39..682E. doi:10.4319/lo.1994.39.3.0682.
- Eicken, H.; Krouse, H. R.; Kadko, D.; Perovich, D. K. (2002). "Tracer studies of pathways and rates of meltwater transport through Arctic summer sea ice". Journal of Geophysical Research: Oceans. 107. Bibcode:2002JGRC..107.8046E. doi:10.1029/2000JC000583.
- Eicken, H.; Grenfell, T. C.; Perovich, D. K.; Richter-Menge, J. A.; Frey, K. (2004). "Hydraulic controls of summer Arctic pack ice albedo". Journal of Geophysical Research: Oceans. 109 2003JC001989. Bibcode:2004JGRC..109.8007E. doi:10.1029/2003JC001989.
