= Polar 3 =

Plane shot down in Western Sahara

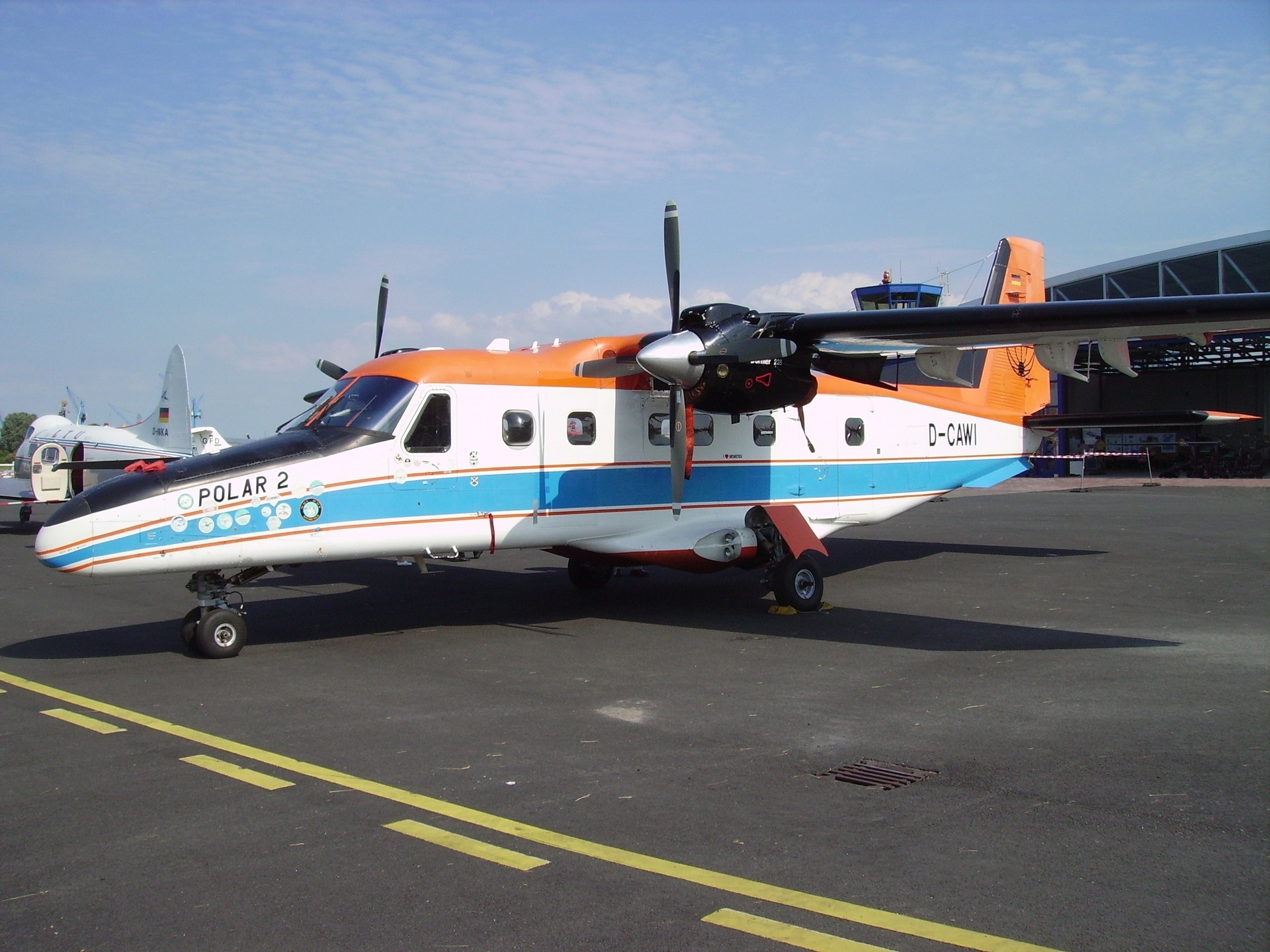
- Polar 2 in June 2008.

Shootdown
- Date: 24 February 1985
- Summary: Shoot-down
- Site: Dakhla, Western Sahara; 23.63°N 15.94°W

Aircraft
- Aircraft type: Dornier 228-100
- Operator: Alfred Wegener Institute
- Registration: D-IGVN
- Flight origin: Dakar-Yoff Airport, Senegal
- Destination: Lanzarote Airport, Canary Islands
- Occupants: 3
- Crew: 3
- Fatalities: 3
- Survivors: 0

Polar 3 was a Dornier 228 owned and operated by the Alfred Wegener Institute that was shot down south of Dakhla, Western Sahara by guerrillas of the Polisario Front on 24 February 1985.

Polar 2 and Polar 3 were the first German airplanes to reach the South Pole when they landed there in December 1984 and were returning from a five-month mission to the Antarctic, having been based at the Gondwana Station. While in Antarctica, Polar 2 was damaged and the bulk of the survey work had to be carried out by Polar 3.

== Incident ==
Polar 3 (FL 90) and Polar 2 (FL 110) were two survey-and-research airplanes of the Alfred Wegener Institute returning from a mission in Antarctica. On 24 February, at approximately 14:45 local time, the two planes took off from Dakar, Senegal bound for Lanzarote Airport, Canary Islands. Their cruise height was 2750 m (approximately 9,000 ft). The two planes' ultimate destination was the Dornier aircraft facility near Oberpfaffenhofen in Bavaria, Germany.

The last radio contact made with Polar 3 occurred at approximately 16:30 GMT. At some point thereafter, it was shot down south of Dakhla by Polisario guerillas. Allegedly, they had mistaken it for a Moroccan spy plane. All three of the Polar 3's crew members – pilot Herbert Hampel, co-pilot Richard Möbius (both 47) and mechanic Josef Schmid (28) – were killed. Polar 2, five minutes ahead of Polar 3, escaped unharmed. The bodies of the Polar 3 crew were eventually recovered five days later.

== Reaction ==
The German government did not recognize Morocco's claim to Western Sahara at the time, remaining neutral in the conflict. They heavily criticized this incident.

Polisario admitted to shooting down Polar 3 but pointed ultimate blame at Morocco for the incident, claiming Morocco used Dornier 228s as spy planes. Polisario fighters had mistaken this particular 228 as a Moroccan spy plane and were unaware Morocco had opened the airspace over the combat region. The year prior, Polisario had shot down three airplanes, two Moroccan and one Belgian.

Morocco denied the use of Dornier 228 planes. The question was also raised as to why the air traffic control in Dakar directed the plane over the disputed and potentially dangerous Western Sahara territory rather than the safe airspace to the west over the Atlantic Ocean.

== Aircraft ==
Polar 3 was a special version of the Dornier 228-101. The plane had been equipped with a combined wheel and ski landing gear, allowing it to land on snow as well as on hard surfaces. The plane had modified generators on board, additional tanks and de-icing equipment for propellers and wings. It was also specially insulated for use in polar regions.

Polar 2 and 3 weighed almost seven tons and could be used for survey missions as well as for transport and search and rescue missions.

The scientific equipment the plane carried was used for measuring the magnetic and gravity field of the Earth, surface conductivity, surface temperatures, ice thickness and topographic layouts below the ice surface.
