= Alfred Wegener Institute for Polar and Marine Research =

German research institution

Alfred Wegener Institute, Helmholtz Centre for Polar and Marine Research
- Alfred-Wegener-Institut, Helmholtz-Zentrum für Polar- und Meeresforschung

Agency overview
- Formed: 1980
- Headquarters: Bremerhaven, Germany
- Employees: >1,000 in 2021 (2009: 770)
- Annual budget: 140 Million Euro / year: Federal Ministry of Education and Research: 90%, State of Bremen: 8%, State of Brandenburg: 1%, State of Schleswig-Holstein: 1 %
- Agency executives: Prof. Hajo Eicken; Dr. Karsten Wurr
- Parent agency: Helmholtz Association
- Website: www.awi.de/

former Logo

The Alfred Wegener Institute, Helmholtz Centre for Polar and Marine Research (German: Alfred-Wegener-Institut, Helmholtz-Zentrum für Polar- und Meeresforschung) is located in Bremerhaven, Germany, and a member of the Helmholtz Association of German Research Centres. It conducts research in the Arctic, the Antarctic, and the high and mid latitude oceans. Additional research topics are: North Sea research, marine biological monitoring, and technical marine developments. The institute was founded in 1980 and is named after meteorologist, climatologist, and geologist Alfred Wegener.

AWI is the biggest institution for polar and ocean research and science in Germany. The annual budget is 140 Mio EUR (2018) and the institute has a staff of more than 1000 people.

== History ==
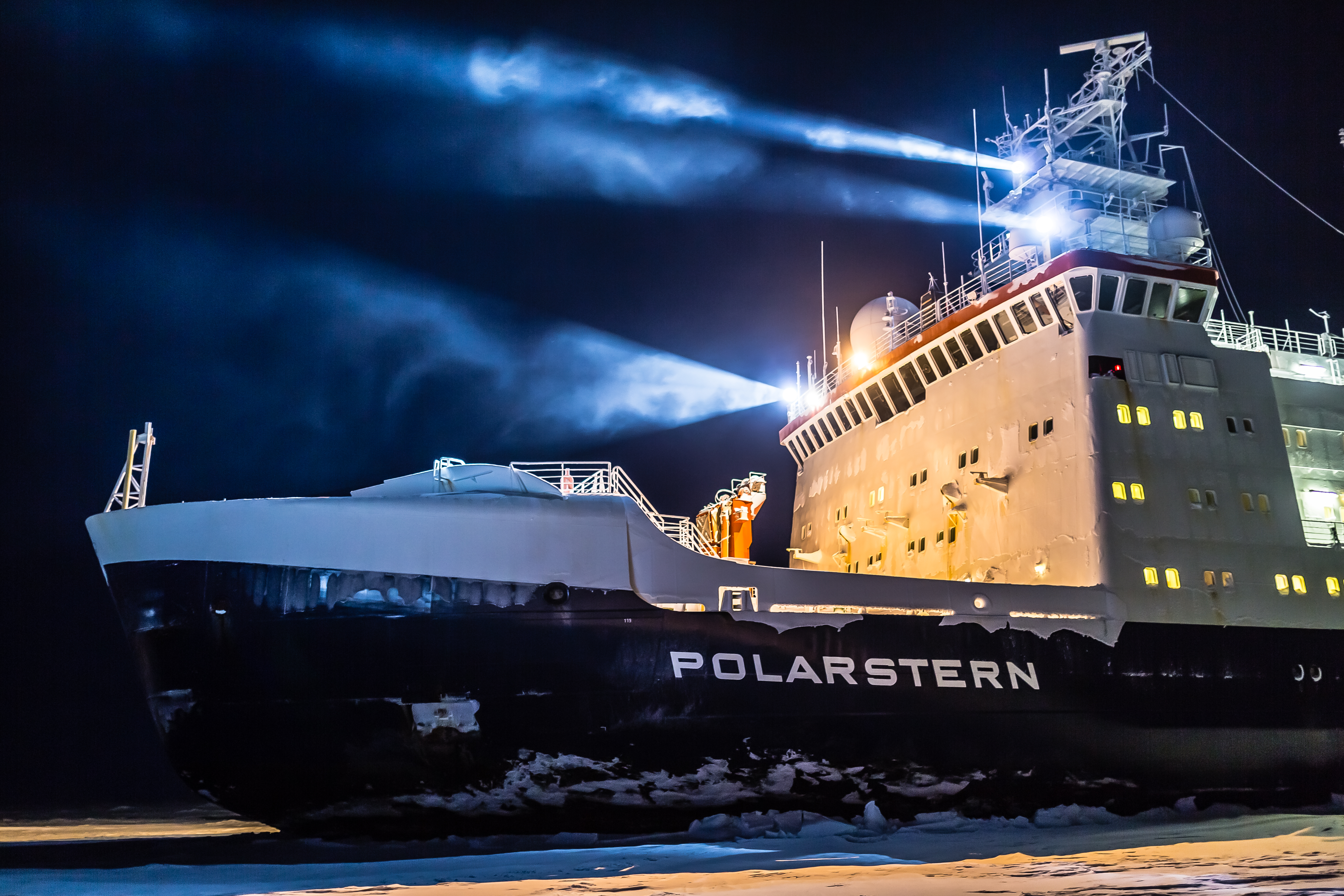
RV Polarstern at MOSAiC expedition 2020 Photo: AWI, S. Hendricks

The foundation of the AWI happened in a political environment that was characterized by system competition between East and West. The GDR had been conducting its own Antarctic research for decades. In the 1970s, it became clear that there would be one scarcity of biological- and mineral resources. Also due to the experience of the oil crisis of 1973, the Federal Republic of Germany decided to intensify its activities in polar research for geostrategic reasons and undertake larger research projects in the Antarctic Ocean and in Antarctica. In 1975/76 and 1977/78, expeditions were conducted to exploration of migration routs of the krill.

In 1978, the German Bundestag decided that polar research will be a governmental task of national interest, that West Germany will become a member of the Antarctic Treaty System and will found a polar research institute. In 1980, the "AWI act" was decided by the Bürgerschaft of Bremen.

The founding director was Gotthilf Hempel. The construction of the first German antarctic base, the first Georg von Neumayer station (GvN station I), had already begun in 1979. In 1981, the station was operational. In 1978, the Federal Ministry of Education and Research commissioned the tender for a research icebreaker. After the public tender, the hull of the first German polar research ship was laid by HDW Howaldtswerke-Deutsche Werft in 1981. The RV Polarstern has been in operation for the AWI since 1982.

On 24 February 1985, the Polar 3, a research airplane of the institute of the type Dornier 228, was shot down by members of Polisario Front over West Sahara. Both pilots and the mechanic died. Polar 3, together with unharmed Polar 2, was on its way back from Antarctica and had taken off in Dakar, Senegal, to reach Arrecife, Canary Islands.

In 1986, the main building of AWi were built at "Old harbour" (Alten Hafen) in the center of Bremerhaven by plans of architect Oswald Mathias Ungers (Building D). In 2004 the headquarter of AWI moved to Fischereihafenschleuse and a new building by Otto Steidle had been built at Am Handelshafen.

In January 2005, Polar 4 was severely damaged during a rough landing at the British overwintering station Rothera on the Antarctic Peninsula. As it was impossible to repair the plane, the aircraft had to be decommissioned. Since then, scientific and logistical tasks of polar flights have been performed by Polar 2.

After years of preparation, Alfred Wegener Institute conduct up from September 2019, the international Arctic expedition MOSAiC (the Multidisciplinary drifting Observatory for the Study of Arctic Climate), which was one of the largest research actions of its kind. Around 442 scientists from 20 countries worked at different tasks in extreme weather. The research expedition had a budget of 140 million Euros. Also no other polar research trip was exploited as much in the media as the MOSAiC expedition since then. The Alfred Wegener Institute increased its press department before and during the expedition, hired a "Communications Manager MOSAiC" and an own photographer to feed "MOSAiC" channels on Twitter and Instagram.

At the beginning, the AWI focus was to set up the complex infrastructure for research in the Arctic and Antarctic regions. In addition to international prestige, the territorial claim to resources from terrestrial and maritime areas was one of the reasons for Germany for the cost-intensive work of Alfred Wegener Institute. Climatologists and geophysicists at AWI recognized the fatal effects of global warming in the most affected geographical areas in the 1980s early on, but gained less attention outside the scientific community. In the 1990s, the mainly geophysical-oceanographic research was expanded to include the biological aspects of polar and deep-sea habitats, among other things. From the 2000s, the problem of climate change reached the consciousness of German society and the politics that funded the AWI. The focus and promotion of the institus work get adopted to the debate about global change. Current projects had often also the aim to research special aspect of climate change and the effectes of global warming especially to the polar regions. With the director Boetius, the public relations and the marketing of the polar research were pushed forward.

In 2024, the AWI signed a memorandum of understanding with Antarctica New Zealand to foster cooperation between the two polar science bodies, amid China's growing presence in Antarctica.

== Research ==
The institute has three major departments:

- Climate System Department, which studies oceans, ice and atmosphere as physical and chemical systems.
- Biosciences Department, which studies the biological processes in marine and coastal ecosystems.
- Geoscientific Department, which studies climate development, especially as revealed by sediments.

The institute is an active member of the University of the Arctic. UArctic is an international cooperative network based in the Circumpolar Arctic region, consisting of more than 200 universities, colleges, and other organizations with an interest in promoting education and research in the Arctic region.

== Facilities ==
The institute is distributed over several sites within North Germany and the Otto Schmidt Laboratory for Polar and Marine Research (OSL) at the Arctic and Antarctic Research Institute (AARI) in Saint Petersburg as Russian-German cooperation in the field of Arctic research, named after the polar explorer Otto Schmidt.

=== Bremerhaven ===
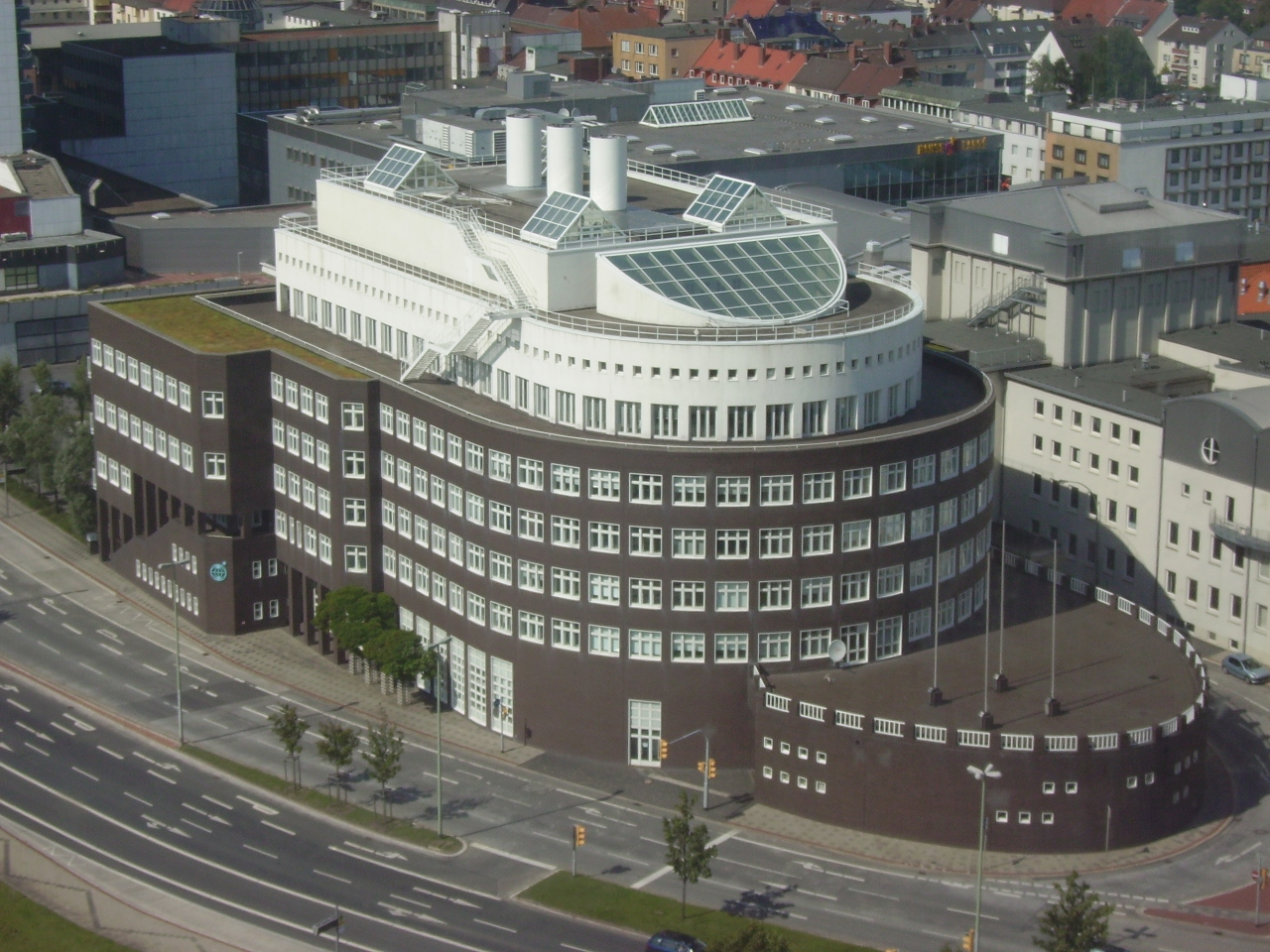
Building D resembles the stern of a ship.

The headquarters was founded by Gotthilf Hempel. Nowadays, the AWI has several buildings within the city of Bremerhaven.

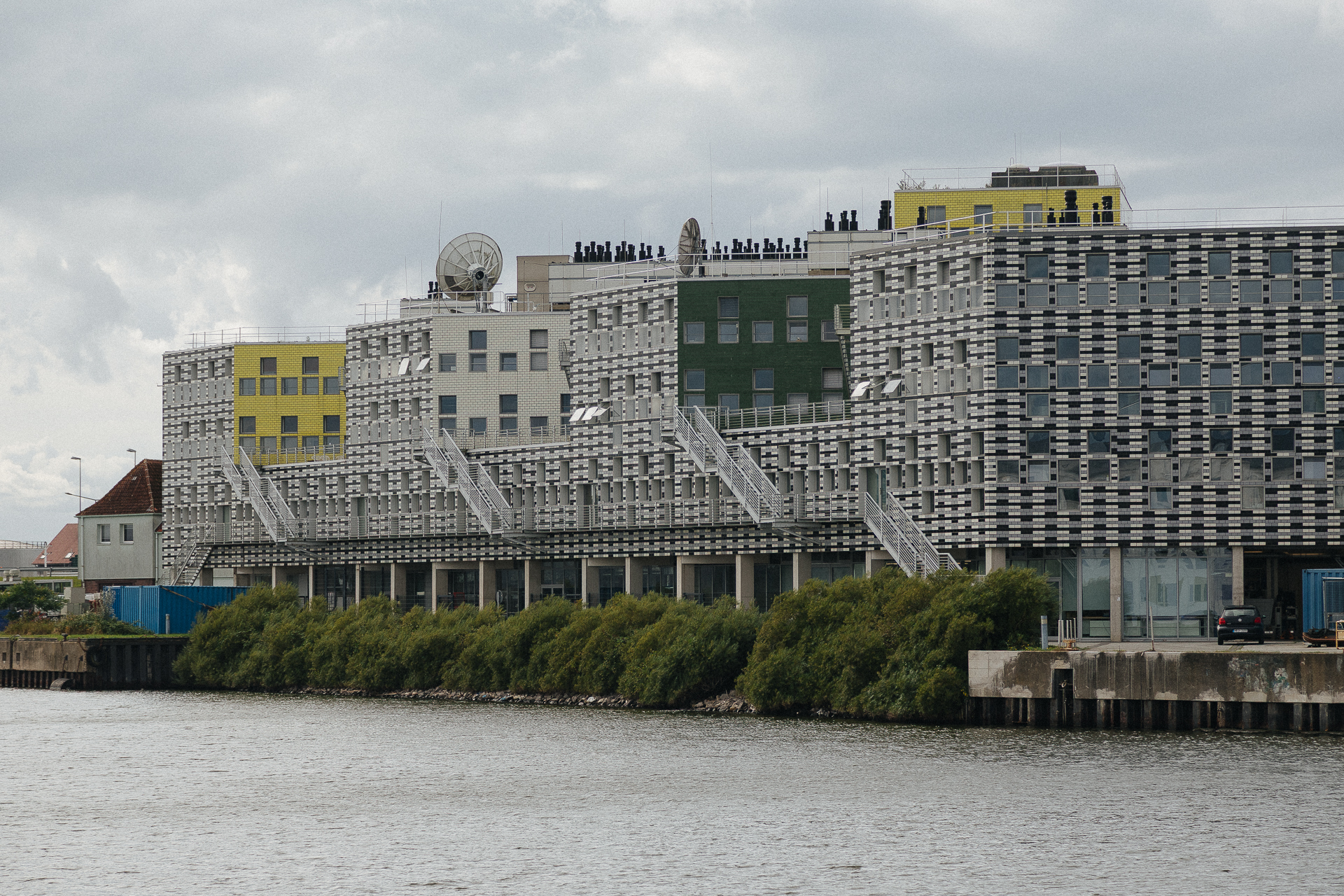
Building E.

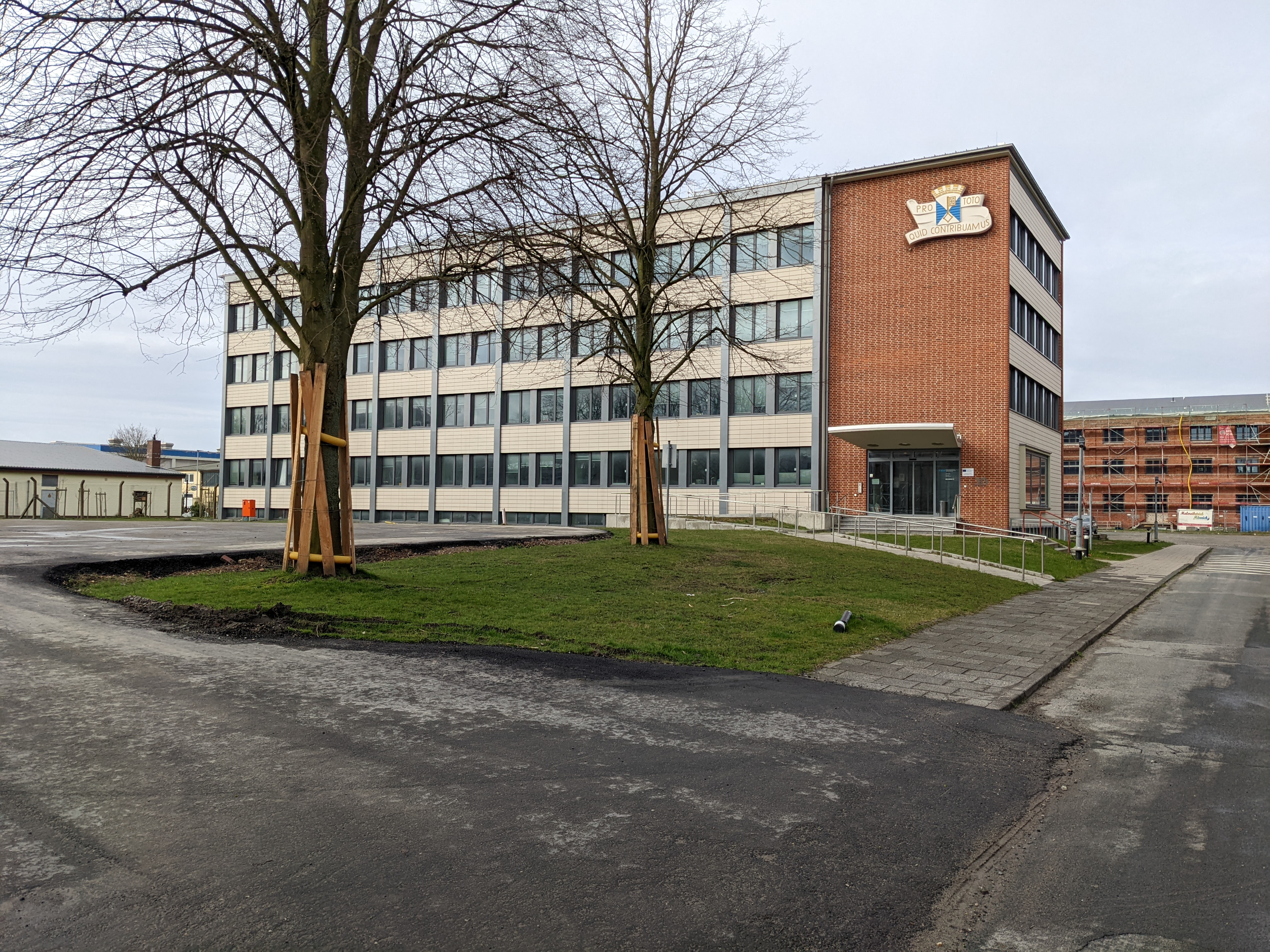
Building G. AWI Campus Klußmannstraße

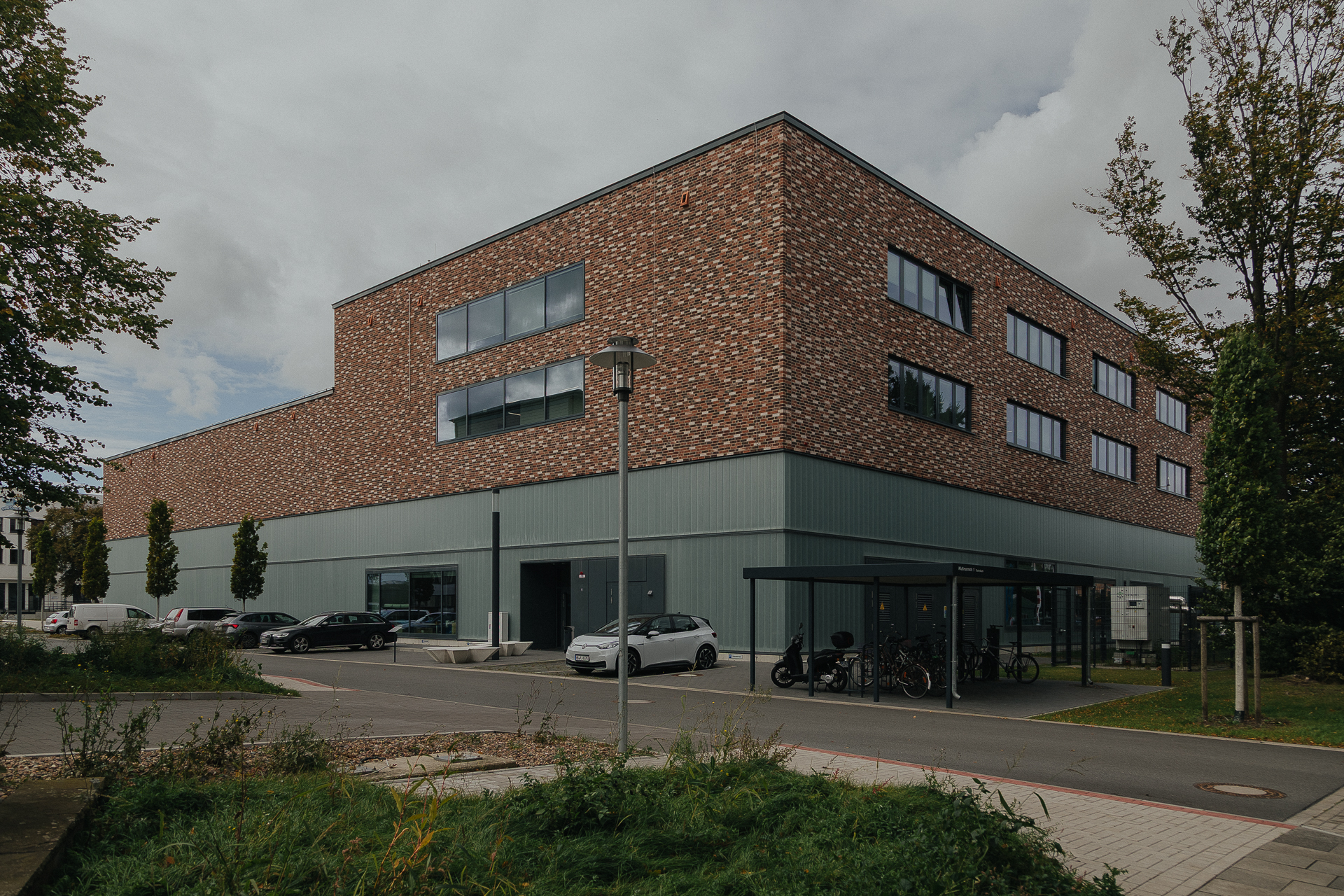
Technikum building (2023)

- Building D is located next to the old port (German: Alter Hafen). The dark clink-brick building was designed by Oswald Mathias Ungers in 1985 who won the architecture-award BDA-prize for the building. It hosts the AWI library, the main lecture hall and various laboratories and offices.
- The main building E is next to the lock Doppelschleuse. Main characteristics are the chequered tiles and the fact that there are three office towers. The building was designed by Otto Steidle and constructed in 2004 as an extension of the complex A, B, C.
- Building G was added to the AWI campus on Klußmannstraße. Just like the neighbouring building H it hosts offices and formerly belonged to the Nordsee chain.
- Building H is located at Klußmannstraße 3 and was formerly known as Speicher A des Handelshafens and the Nordsee-Hauptverwaltung. Built between 1857 and 1862 and renovated in 1933, it is a listed historic building. The building has been restored to preserve its historic architecture while integrating modern office and meeting facilities.
- The Harbour Warehouse (German: Hafenlager) is located within the Lloyd Werft, see Lloyd Werft Map.
- The small Bathymetry Building is located close to the radar tower.
- The Technikum is a state-of-the-art research and development center at the AWI, focusing on polar and marine technology. It provides extensive lab space and equipment for engineering and research projects. The facility was built on the site of the former Nordsee Villa, which was demolished to make way for this new development.
- The Nordsee Villa, which formerly belonged to the fast-food restaurant chain Nordsee and hosted a few offices of AWI, was demolished to facilitate the construction of the Technikum.

=== Potsdam ===
The Forschungsstelle Potsdam is situated on the Telegrafenberg next to Potsdam. It belongs to AWI since 1992. The research focuses on the atmospheric physics and atmospheric chemistry of the atmosphere on the one hand and periglacial research on the other hand.

=== Sylt ===
The Wadden Sea Station Sylt is located on the North German island Sylt. It was founded in 1924 by the Biologische Anstalt Helgoland as an oyster laboratory to study the decline of stocks of the European flat oyster (Ostrea edulis) and try to discern how these molluscs could be cultivated. In 1937, the name changed from Oyster laboratory to Wadden Sea station. The station grew, and in 1949 the station was shifted from the northernmost edge of the island to the current location, north of the harbor of List. In 1998 the station became part of AWI. Currently, there are about 30 scientists and technicians working at the station year round with many guest scientists and university courses visiting during the summer months for guest research. Two guest houses and a modern course room allow to perform workshops and video conferences are possible.

The research focuses on coastal ecology and coastal geology. In the 1930s and earlier there existed European oyster reefs in areas below the Blue mussel banks at the water level. Below these, there existed sabellaria reefs which later were destroyed by fishery. Nowadays there are mixed beds of Blue mussels and the introduced Pacific oyster.

=== Helgoland ===
The Biologische Anstalt Helgoland is situated at 54.177821°N 7.891402°E on the island Heligoland (German: Helgoland). The station has existed since 1892. Scientists study the ecology of the North Sea in this research station.

Since 1962, at Heligoland roadstead 54°11′2″N 7°54′0″E, phytoplankton and water samples are taken every weekday morning, the turbidity is measured (e.g. using a Secchi disk) and other parameters are recorded. The data of this Long time series, called Helgoland Roads, can be found on the website PANGAEA. The North Sea warmed by 1.65 °C since the start of the time series.

== Stations ==
The institute maintains several research stations around the Arctic Ocean and on the Antarctic continent.

=== Neumayer Station ===
Neumayer Station III is located at 70°40′08″S 8°16′02″W, about 5 kilometres (3.1 mi) away from the previous station, Neumayer II which is now abandoned and covered by a thick ice cover. The new station (Webcam) is a futuristic-looking combined platform above the snow surface offering space for research, operations, and living since 2009. The station stands on 16 hydraulic posts which are used to adjust the building to the growing snow cover. A balloon-launching hall is located on the stations roof. Below the station PistenBully, Ski-Doos, sledges, and other equipment are stored in a garage built beneath the snow, with a ramp with a lid that seals the hole for the vehicles to enter. In summer, the station can host up to 40 people. The station contains several laboratories, has a weather balloon launching facility, and a hospital with telemedical equipment. The station has a stairwell and several utility and storage rooms in the garage. There is a snowmelt and power unit at the station.

=== Dallmann Laboratory ===
In cooperation with the Instituto Antártico Argentino (IAA), in 1994 the AWI opened a research station on King George Island at 62°14.00′S 58°40.00′W. The station is named after Eduard Dallmann, a German whaler, trader and Polar explorer who lived near Bremen.

=== Koldewey Station ===
Koldewey Station at 78°55′24″N 11°55′15″E is named after the German polar explorer Carl Koldewey and part of the French-German Arctic Research AWIPEV Arctic in Ny-Ålesund on Svalbard.

=== Kohnen Station ===
Kohnen Station was established in 2001 as logistical base for ice core drilling in Dronning Maud Land, Antarctica, at 75°0′S 0°4′E

=== Samoylov Station ===
Samoylov Station is a Russian research station at 72°22′6″N 126°28′29″E lays within the Lena Delta close to the Laptev Sea. The station was set up as a logistic base for joint Russian-German permafrost studies by the Lena Delta Reserve (LDR) and the AWI.

== Ships ==
Altogether there are six ships that belong to AWI.

=== RV Polarstern ===
The AWI flagship is Germany's research icebreaker RV Polarstern. The ship was commissioned in 1982. The double-hulled icebreaker is operational up to temperatures as low as −50 °C (−58 °F). Polarstern can break through sea ice of 1.5 m thickness at a speed of 5 knots, thicker ice must be broken by ramming. In 2022 the German Bundestag approved 2 million Euros budget for the contract award procedure for the construction of the new icebreaker Polarstern II.

=== RV Heincke ===
The vessel RV Heincke is a multifunctional and low-noise ship for research in ice-free waters, named after German zoologist and ichthyologist Friedrich Heincke . With a length of 54.6 m, a width of 12.5 m and a draft 4.16 m, the ship is categorized as "medium research vessel" within the German research fleet. The ship was put into operation in 1990, its building costs have been around 16 Millionen Euro. On the vessel, up to 12 scientists and 8 crew members can work for up to 30 passage days. This corresponds to an operating range of roughly 7500 nautical miles. The shipowner is Briese Schiffahrts GmbH & Co. KG from Leer, a city in East Frisia.

=== RV Uthörn ===
Silhouette of RV Uthörn. The length overall is 30.5 m, it has 2.5 m draft and a width of 8.5 m.

The research cutter RV Uthörn is named after the small island Uthörn next to Sylt in the North Sea. The vessel is regularly on research tours in German Bight, but is also used to supply the AWI branch Biologische Anstalt Helgoland mentioned above. Two scientists and four crew members can live and work on board for up to 180 days, but the vessel mainly used for day trips. Another operation purpose are short term cruises of a few hours for up to 25 students to demonstrate oceanographic and biological sampling methods.

Being commissioned in 1982 RV Uthörn replaced a vessel with the same name which was built in 1947 and had a length of 24 m. The current vessel is powered by two V12 four-stroke Diesel engines manufactured by the company MWM GmbH from Mannheim. Each engine delivers up to 231 kW to a controllable-pitch propeller; the maximal speed is around 10 kn. On the working deck, there is a dry lab and a laboratory for wet work like sorting fish. The ship is equipped with standard sampling devices: You may find on board a demersal trawl, a Van Veen Grab Sampler, Niskin bottles, and even deprecated reversing thermometers for teaching purposes.

=== Mya, Mya II, Aade, Diker and Arenaria ===
The research catamaran Mya was a specially designed for research in the intertidal zone, it could fall dry at low tide. In 2013 it was replaced by the conventional ship Mya II. The main research area is the Wadden Sea and offshore wind farms. Last but not least, there are three small motor boats, Aade and Diker for sampling and diving operations around Heligoland and Arenaria for similar tasks on Sylt.

== Aircraft ==
=== Past aircraft ===
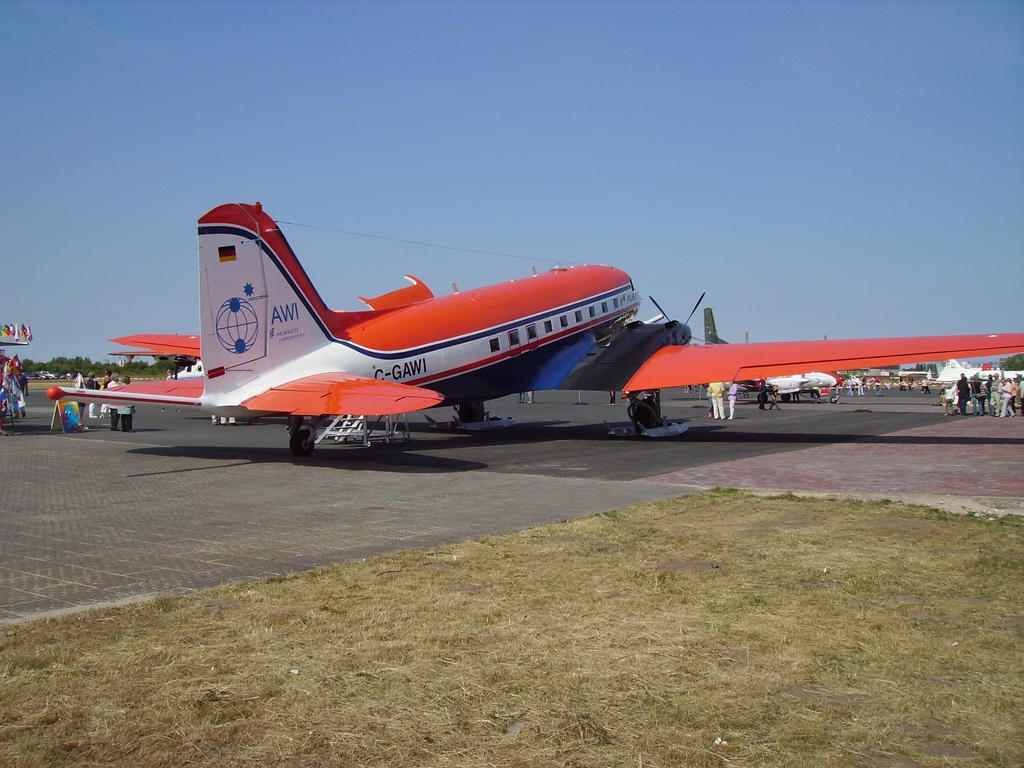
Polar 5 in June 2008

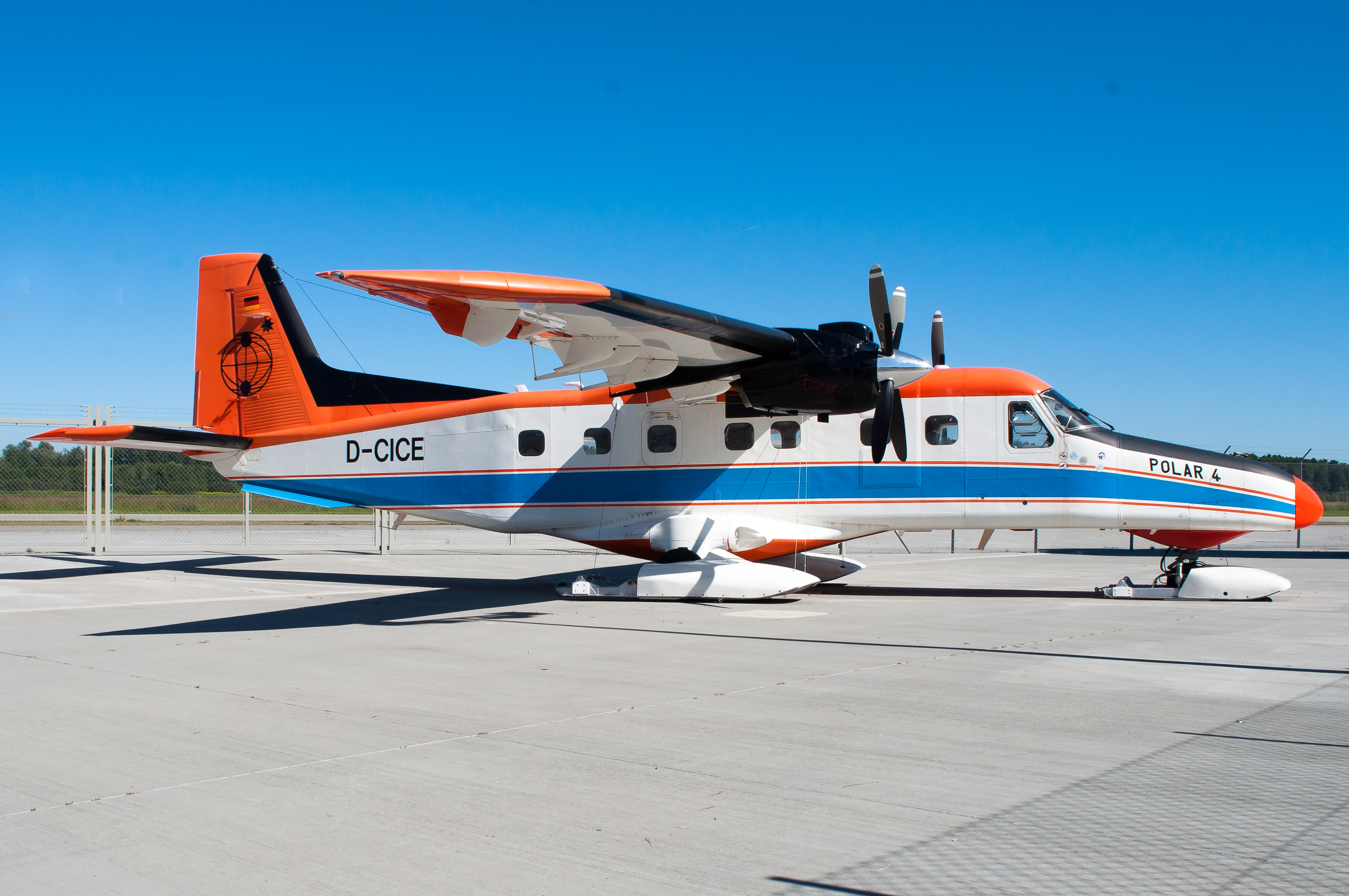
Ski-equipped Polar 4

The Alfred Wegener Institute operated five airplanes under the name of Polar, those being:

- Polar 1, a Dornier 128 commissioned in 1983, now in possession of the TU Braunschweig
- Polar 2, a Dornier 228 commissioned in 1983, still in service with the AWI
- Polar 3, like Polar 2 commissioned in 1983, shot down possibly by SA-2 Guideline missile on 24 February 1985 over Western Sahara
- Polar 4, a Dorniers 228 commissioned in 1985, severely damaged at a landing at the British Rothera Research Station in 2005, now on display at the Institute

=== Current fleet ===
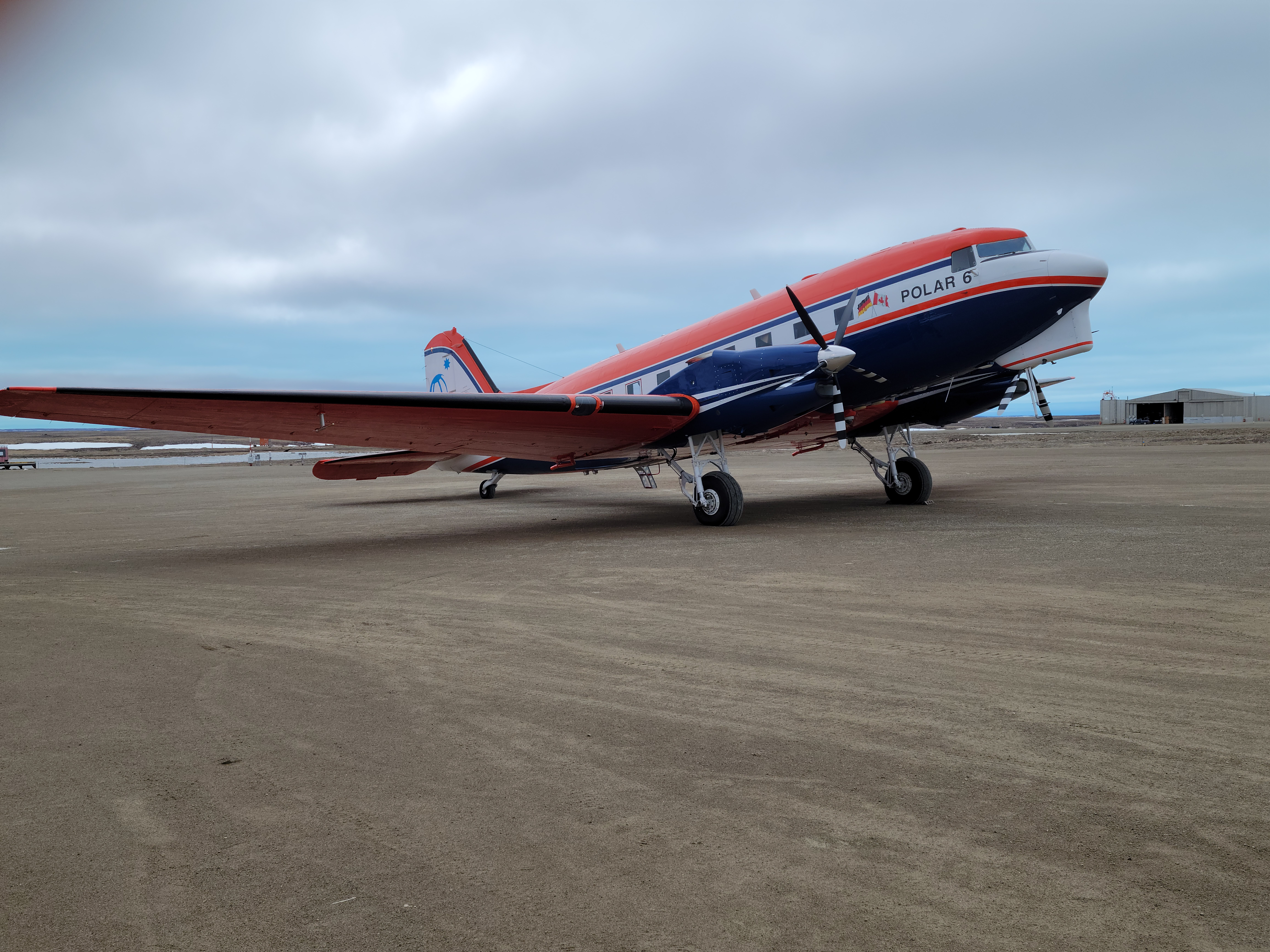
Polar 6 at Cambridge Bay Airport, en route from Iqaluit to Inuvik

Homeport of AWI-fleet is Bremen Airport. AWI uses two Basler BT-67.These planes are 20 m long, 5.2 m high and have a wingspan of 29 m. The empty weight is 7680 kg, with ski landing gear it weighs 8340 kg. The minimal cruising speed is 156 km/h, the maximum is SFA. Without payload, the flying range is around 3900 km. The planes are maintained by the company Kenn Borek Air located in Calgary, Alberta, Canada.

==== Polar 5 ====
The plane hull was built in 1942 but completely refurbished after the AWI acquired the plane in 2007. Since then it "has supplied a large volume of valuable data" said Prof. Heinrich Miller, the former director of the AWI.

==== Polar 6 ====
This plane with the call sign C-GHGF was acquired by AWI in 2011. The BMBF, the German Federal Minister of Education and Research funded the purchase and equipping of the plane with a total of 9.78 million euros.

== Notable people ==
- Doris Abele, marine biologist
- Allison Fong, researcher
- Gerald Haug, member of the board of governors
- Karin Lochte, director from 2007 to 2017
- Victor Smetacek, head of the Pelagic Ecosystems Division

== See also ==
- Open access in Germany
- Ocean Frontier Institute, an oceans research centre in Halifax, Canada
