= 1939 in Norway =

- Centuries: 18th; 19th; 20th; 21st
- Decades: 1910s; 1920s; 1930s; 1940s; 1950s
- See also: List of years in Norway

Events in the year 1939 in Norway.

== Incumbents ==
- Monarch – Haakon VII.
- Prime Minister – Johan Nygaardsvold (Labour Party)

== Events ==
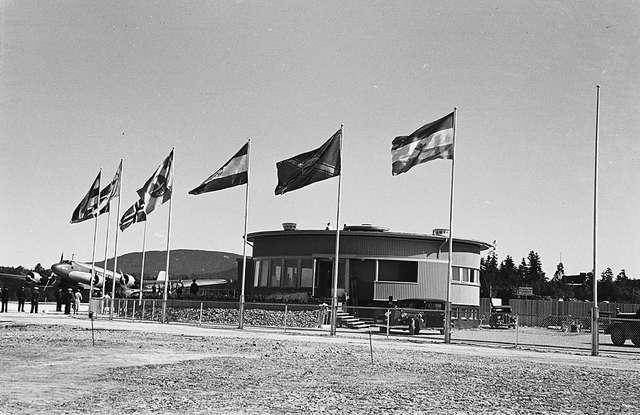
Oslo Airport, Fornebu on 1 July 1939, the day it opened.

- 17 May – Sweden, Norway, and Finland refuse Germany's offer of non-aggression pacts.
- 1 June – Oslo Airport, Fornebu is opened.
- 1 June – Kristiansand Airport, Kjevik is officially opened.
- 1 September – Norway, Finland, Sweden and Switzerland declare their neutrality.

== Notable births ==
=== January ===
- 1 January – Lars Oftedal Broch, judge (died 2017).
- 8 January – Laila Kaland, politician (died 2007)
- 12 January – Dagfinn Ripnes, politician
- 13 January –
  - Guri Vesaas, translator and publishing house editor.
  - Kari Wærness, sociologist (died 2026).
- 15 January – Bjørn Hansen, soccer player and coach (died 2018)
- 17 January – Kari Knudsen, model

=== February ===
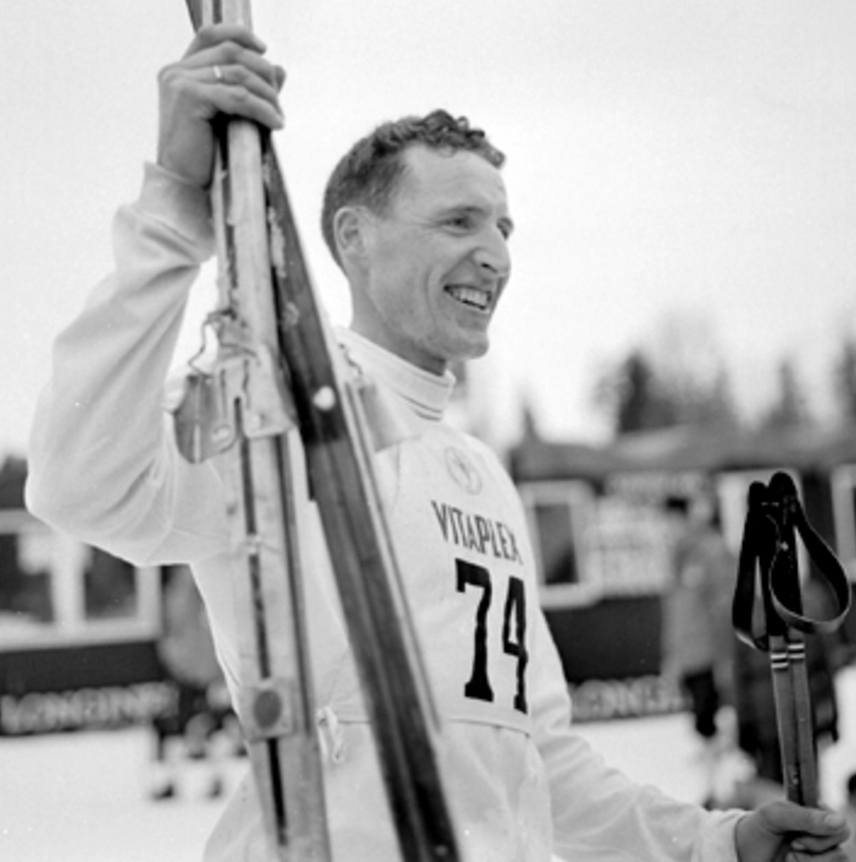
Ole Ellefsæter

- 4 February – Ola Hunderi, physicist (died 2016)
- 5 February – Tor Bjerkmann, publisher (died 1999).
- 13 February – Bjørn Bergvall, sailor and Olympic gold medallist.
- 14 February – Grete Nash, ceramist (died 1999).
- 15 February – Ole Ellefsæter, cross country skier, double Olympic gold medallist and World Champion (died 2022).
- 16 February – Sigmund Borgundvåg, naval architect
- 21 February – Svein Erik Brodal, actor, theatre director, poet, novelist and politician.

=== March ===
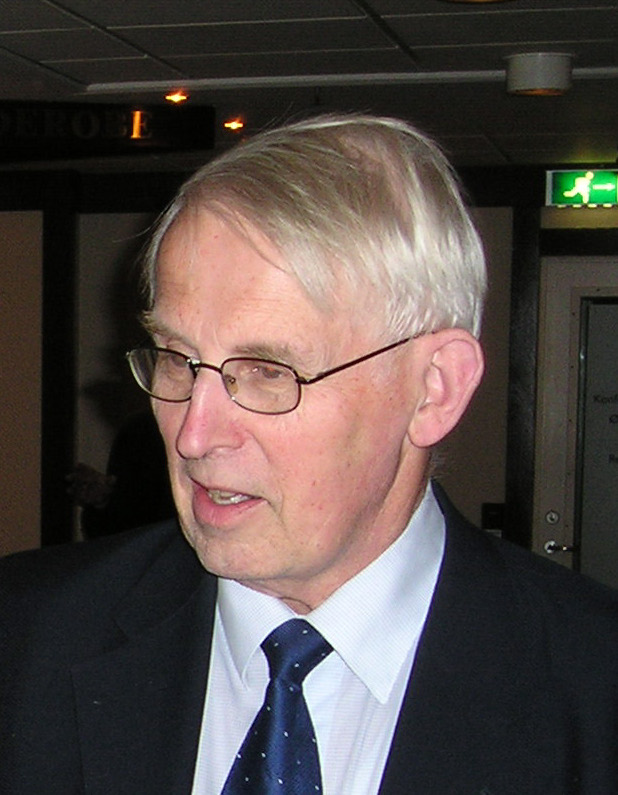
Ole Danbolt Mjøs

- 8 March – Ole Danbolt Mjøs, physician and politician, leader of the Norwegian Nobel Committee (died 2013).
- 8 March – Per A. Utsi, politician (died 2024).
- 17 March – Lars Lefdal, politician
- 23 March – Hans Rasmus Astrup, ship broker, art collector, and founder of the Astrup Fearnley Museum of Modern Art (died 2021).
- 23 March – Jannik Lindbæk, businessperson
- 27 March – Per Ove Width, politician
- 28 March – Toppen Bech, journalist (died 2024).

=== April ===
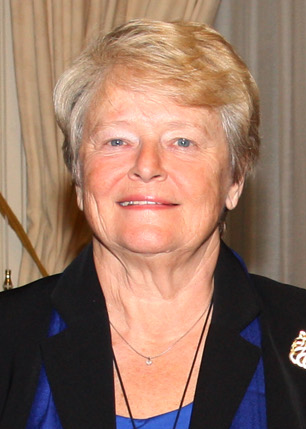
Gro Harlem Brundtland

- 3 April – Kari Vogt, religions historian (died 2024).
- 4 April – Ragnhild Queseth Haarstad, politician and Minister (died 2017)
- 7 April – Kjell Kaspersen, international soccer player
- 8 April – Veslemøy Haslund, actress (died 2005).
- 14 April – Olaf Aurdal, politician
- 14 April – Dag Kavlie, shipping engineer
- 17 April – Jan Hoem, demographer (died 2017)
- 19 April – Solveig Sollie, politician and Minister
- 20 April – Gro Harlem Brundtland, Norway's first female Prime Minister

=== May ===
- 8 May – Tore A. Liltved, politician (died 2004)
- 13 May – Kari Løvaas, operatic soprano (died 2025)
- 17 May – Ola B. Johannessen, actor, stage producer and theatre director.
- 19 May – Tore Godal, physician.
- 23 May – Gunnar Breimo, politician (died 2024)

=== June ===
- 3 June – Jon Tolaas, poet and author (died 2012).

=== July ===
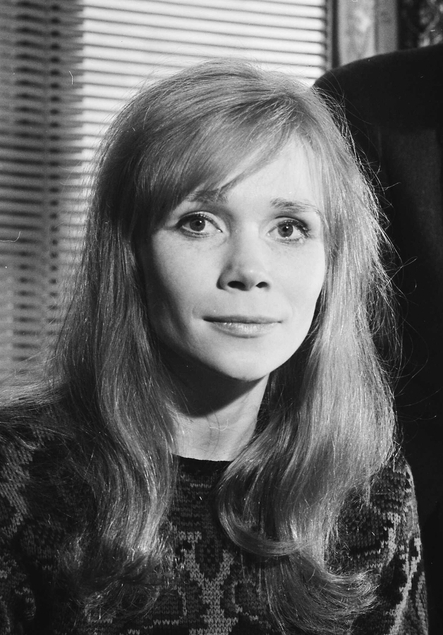
Monna Tandberg

- 2 July –
  - Per Spook, fashion designer.
  - Monna Tandberg, actress (died 2025).
- 4 July – Thea Stabell, actress
- 15 July – Eilert Stang Lund, judge
- 15 July – Ketil Lund, judge
- 21 July – Magnar Norderhaug, zoologist and ecologist (died 2006)
- 25 July – Arne L. Haugen, politician
- 29 July – Jon Istad, biathlete and World Champion (died 2012)
- 29 July – Georg Johan Jacobsen, politician (died 2011)
- 30 July – Syver Berge, politician

=== August ===
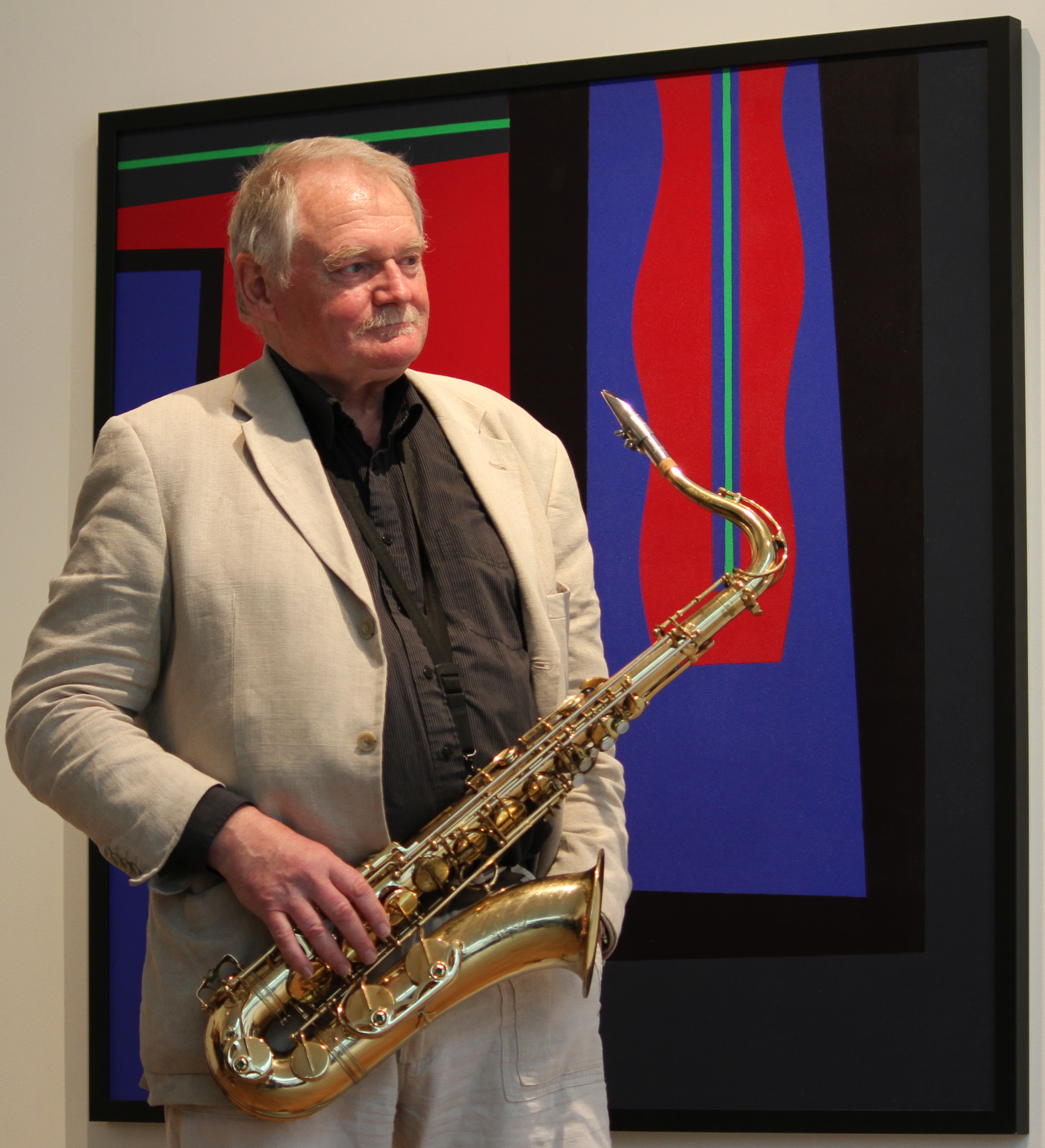
Ove Stokstad

- 5 August – Nils Are Øritsland, polar researcher in zoophysiology and ecology (died 2006)
- 9 August – Odd Børre, pop singer
- 9 August – Ove Stokstad, printmaker and jazz musician (died 2018).
- 18 August – Harald Heide-Steen Jr. actor, comedian and singer (died 2008)
- 18 August – Georg Indrevik, politician

=== September ===
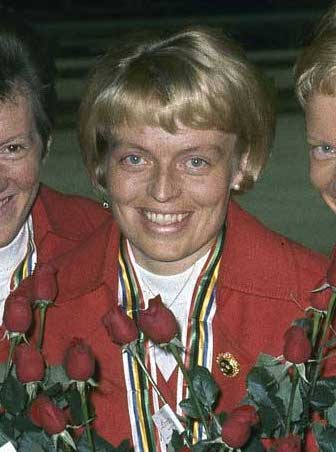
Babben Enger-Damon

- 8 September – Arne Kielland, journalist and politician (died 2003).
- 16 September – Jon Hellesnes, philosopher, novelist and essayist
- 19 September – Babben Enger-Damon, cross country skier, Olympic gold medallist and orienteer
- 23 September – Rolf Birger Pedersen, football player and coach (died 2001)
- 25 September – Berit Nøkleby, historian (died 2018).
- 26 September – Snøfrid Skaare, politician
- 26 September – Lars Jacob Krogh, journalist (died 2010)

=== October ===
- 1 October – Astrid Sandvik, alpine skier
- 2 October – Kristin K. Devold, politician
- 3 October – Anneliese Dørum, politician (died 2000)
- 16 October – Sverre Bergh Johansen, diplomat
- 16 October – Hans Fredrik Dahl, historian, journalist and professor.
- 21 October – Kjell Borgen, politician and Minister (died 1996)
- 30 October – Gro Gulden, mycologist

=== November ===
- 16 November – Tor Åge Bringsværd, author, playwright, editor and translator (died 2025)
- 27 November – Erik Bartnes, farmer and politician (died 2020)

=== December ===
- 1 December – Halvdan Skard, politician
- 27 December – Olav Jordet, biathlete, Olympic silver medallist and World Champion

== Notable deaths ==
=== January to June ===
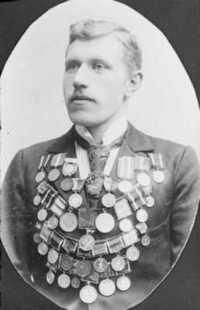
Peder Østlund

- 2 January – Eyvind Andersen, judge (born 1874).
- 22 January – Peder Østlund, speed skater (born 1872)
- 2 March – Einar Wang, politician (born 1855)
- 7 March – Bertrand Narvesen, businessperson (born 1860)
- 25 June – Olaf Ørvig, sailor and Olympic gold medallist (born 1889)
- 27 June – Mikal Angell Jacobus Landmark, politician (born 1867)

=== July to December ===
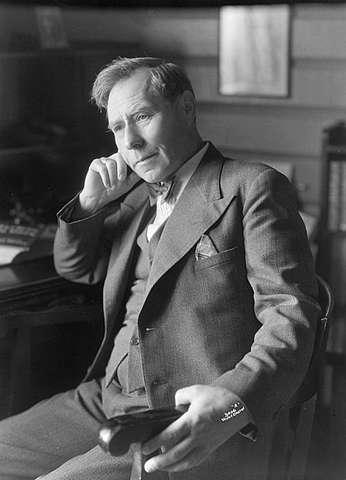
Olav Duun

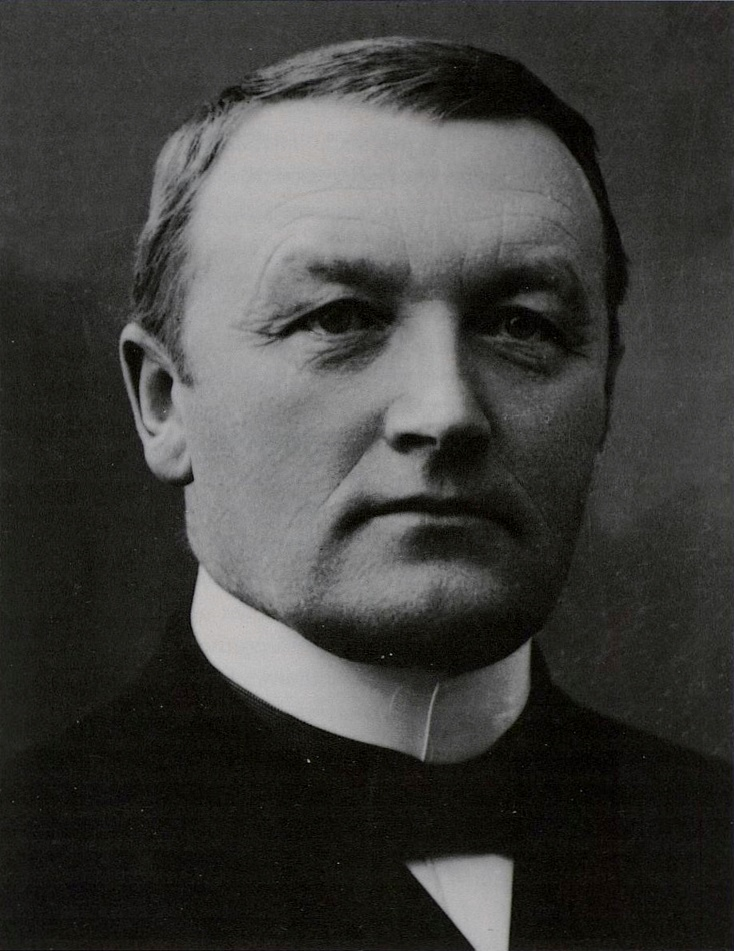
Jens Bratlie

- 17 July – Oskar Braaten, novelist and playwright (born 1881)
- 14 August – Regine Normann, teacher and writer (born 1867).
- 21 August – Sigurd Høst, educator (born 1866).
- 13 September – Olav Duun, novelist (born 1876)
- 15 September – Jens Bratlie, politician and Prime Minister of Norway (born 1856)
- 8 October – Gustav Henriksen, businessperson (born 1872)
- 2 November – Eivind Heiberg, engineer and railway director (born 1870)
- 9 December – Nils Erik Flakstad, businessperson and politician (born 1876)
- 12 December – Olaf Amundsen, politician and Minister (born 1876)
- 14 December – Peter Torjesen, missionary to China (born 1892)
- 22 December – Østen Østensen, rifle shooter and Olympic silver medallist (born 1878)
- 29 December – Johannes Irgens, diplomat, politician and Minister (born 1869)

=== Full date unknown ===
- Lars Jorde, painter (born 1865)
- Elias C. Kiær, businessperson (born 1863)
