= Russian research vessel Yantar =

Russian intelligence flagship

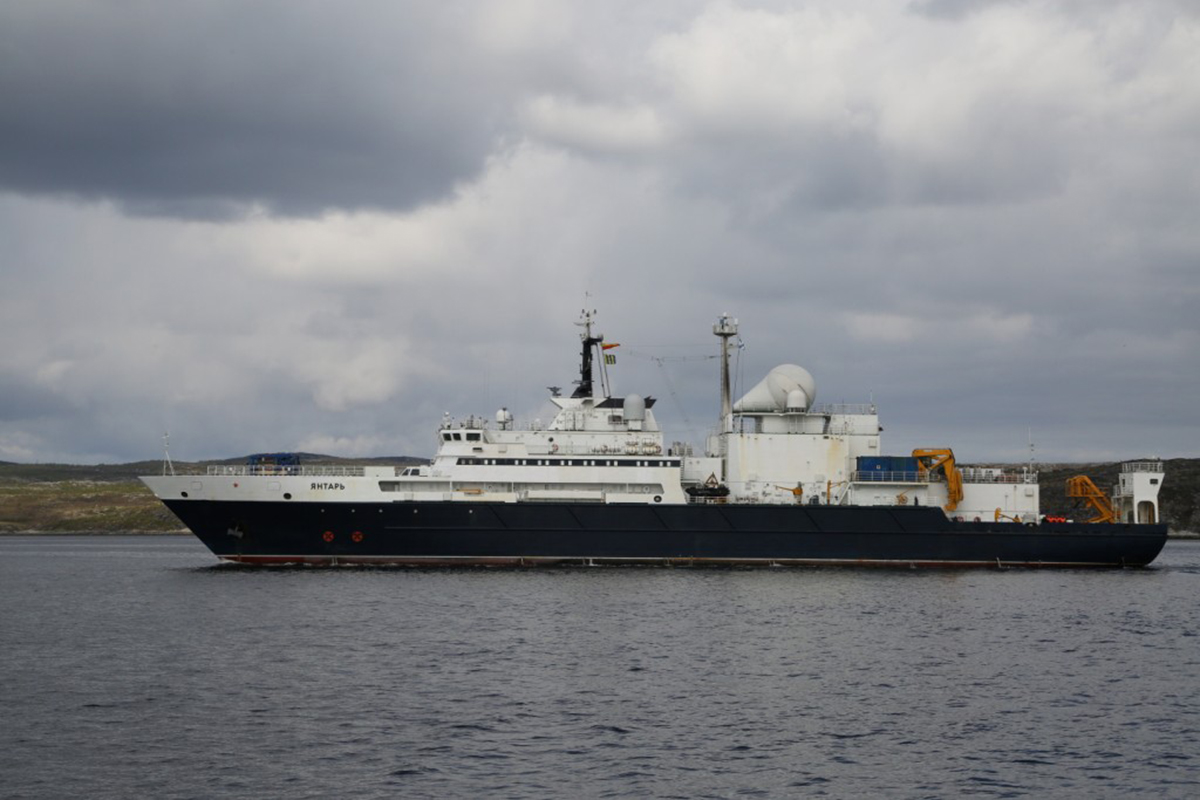

History

Russia
- Name: Yantar
- Builder: Yantar Shipyard
- Yard number: 01602
- Laid down: 8 July 2010
- Launched: 5 December 2012
- Commissioned: 23 May 2015
- Home port: Severomorsk
- Identification: Call sign: RMM91; MMSI number: 273546520
- Status: In service

General characteristics
- Class & type: Project 22010-class intelligence ship
- Displacement: 5,736 tons (full load)
- Length: 107.8 m (353 ft 8 in)
- Beam: 17.2 m (56 ft 5 in)
- Installed power: 2 × 3400 hp electric motors; 4 × 1600 kW diesel generators; 2 × 1080 kW diesel generators
- Propulsion: 2 azipods with fixed pitch propellers; 2 bow thrusters
- Speed: 15 kn (28 km/h; 17 mph)
- Range: 8,000 nmi (15,000 km; 9,200 mi)
- Endurance: 60 days
- Boats & landing craft carried: 2 deep-diving autonomous underwater vehicles; 1 Rus class (Project 16810); 1 Konsul class (Project 16811)
- Complement: 60
- Aviation facilities: Helipad for 1 helicopter

Yantar (Russian: Янтарь) is a special purpose intelligence collection ship built for the Russian Navy. The ship has been operated by the Russian Navy's Main Directorate of Underwater Research (GUGI) since 2015 and is reportedly a spy ship. The vessel's home port is Severomorsk, where it is attached to the Northern Fleet. It is the lead ship of the Project 22010 class, with two sister ships: Almaz (planned launch of 2019 but delayed), intended to serve with the Pacific Fleet, (Note: The fitting out of Almaz was severely delayed due to the sanctions against Russia because of the Russo-Ukrainian War.) and Vice-Admiral Burilichev (laid down 2021).

== Design and construction ==
Yantar was designed by the CMDB Almaz Design Bureau in Saint Petersburg, and the hull was laid down on 8 July 2010. It was launched in December 2012, and concluded its sea trials in May 2015. The ship has a length of 108 metres (354 ft) and a full displacement of 5,736 tons. It uses diesel-electric propulsion for a top speed of approximately 15 knots (28 km/h; 17 mph). It officially has a complement of 60. The ship was built at the Yantar Shipyard in Kaliningrad.

== Roles ==
Yantar can act as a mothership to mini-subs. The United States Navy has stated that the submersibles are able to sever cables miles beneath the ocean's surface. The submersibles are reportedly capable of operating at depths of up to 6,000 metres (20,000 ft). The submersibles are reportedly the project 16810 Rus-class submersible and the project 16811 Konsul-class submersible.

According to Alexei Burilichev, head of the Russian Defence Ministry's deepwater research department from 2005 to 2020, Yantar is an oceanic research complex.

== Activities ==
Yantar has been reported in position near undersea telecommunications cables.

In September 2015, Yantar was spotted off the coast of Guantánamo Bay, Cuba.

In late October 2015, US intelligence sources reported that the vessel was inside Norwegian territorial waters for the first time, heading north along the Norwegian coast. The NJHQ stated that they were aware of the vessel and were monitoring all traffic along the coast.

Summer 2016, Yantar was anchored outside Nuuk, Greenland.

In 2017, Yantar was active in the eastern Mediterranean, near an undersea cable linking Israel to Cyprus. It was also reportedly used to recover and/or destroy "secret equipment" from crashed Su-33 and MiG-29 aircraft.

On 23 November 2017, upon an order of Russian President Vladimir Putin, Yantar and the specialists of the Russian Navy's 328th expedition search and rescue unit were sent to Argentina's coast to search for the Argentine submarine ARA San Juan that went missing on 15 November 2017.

In Summer 2018, she was deployed to Mediterranean off the Syrian coast.

In November 2019, Yantar visited Trinidad and Tobago.

In February 2020, Yantar was found near the Rio de Janeiro submarine cables by the Brazilian Navy. The crew evaded questions about their intentions and turned off the ship's identification systems. In late March, Yantar was anchored off the Baie de la Seine, a few weeks before the Suffren first sea trial from Cherbourg.

In August 2021, Yantar was spotted off the coast of Ireland, running parallel to AEConnect-1 and the expected route of the Celtic Norse submarine communications cable, as well as taking up a stationary position between them for most of the day. Yantar subsequently entered the English Channel in mid-September.

On 11 and 12 September 2023, while being followed by the Norwegian Coast Guard vessel NoCGV Barentshav in the Fram Strait, Yantar closely followed Kronprins Haakon for 16.5 hours. The Russian ship was operating without AIS and would overtly copy all of the research vessel's stops and movements, at one point closing to a distance of 200–370 metres. While the Norwegian Polar Institute characterised the incident as "harassment", and the Royal Norwegian Navy reportedly keeps a close eye on the Russian intelligence vessel, all relevant Norwegian authorities assessed that Yantar acted in accordance with international maritime law.

In November 2024, she was escorted out of the Irish Sea by the Irish offshore patrol vessel LÉ James Joyce. Beneath this area of sea, south-west of the Isle of Man and east of Dublin, lie cables carrying data for Microsoft and Google.

In January 2025, Yantar resupplied in Algiers and attended a high level meeting in Algeria, and then operated on the location of the sunk MV Ursa Major. Yantar was also spotted in British waters, with the Royal Navy deploying HMS Somerset and HMS Tyne to monitor the ship. Its location, close to Cornwall, is believed to possess off-shore infrastructure.

On 19 November 2025, British Defence Secretary John Healey, stated that the intelligence-gathering Yantar had entered the United Kingdom’s wider waters north of Scotland during the previous weeks, and was allegedly engaging in espionage and the mapping of UK's undersea cables. The vessel came within 45 miles of the British coast. In response, the UK deployed a Royal Navy frigate and RAF P-8 Poseidon maritime patrol aircraft to monitor and track the ship, during which Yantar reportedly directed Dazzler lasers at the pilots. Healey described the Russian actions as "deeply dangerous", noting that this was the second visit of Yantar to UK waters in the same year, and warning that Britain was prepared to respond if the vessel attempted to travel further south.

== Sister ships ==
=== Almaz ===
A Project 22010 sister ship Almaz (01604) was laid down at the Yantar Shipyard in Kaliningrad on 9 June 2016. The Russian state news agency TASS reported that after a technical launch in early October 2019, the vessel was intended to monitor rocket launches of the Vostochny Cosmodrome from the Pacific Ocean.

=== Burilichev ===
On 5 February 2021, the third ship of the series was reportedly laid down in the Vyborg Shipyard under the name Vice-Admiral Burilichev, to honour Alexey Vitalyevich Burilichev, who headed GUGI for 15 years and died in November 2020 due to COVID-19.
