= Tolaas =

Tolaas is a Norwegian surname. Notable people with the surname include:

- Jon Tolaas (1939–2012), Norwegian teacher, poet and novelist
- Sissel Tolaas (born 1963), Norwegian artist and researcher
