= Sergei Alekseevich Savateev =

Russian interior designer

Sergei Savateev
- Сергей Алексеевич Саватеев
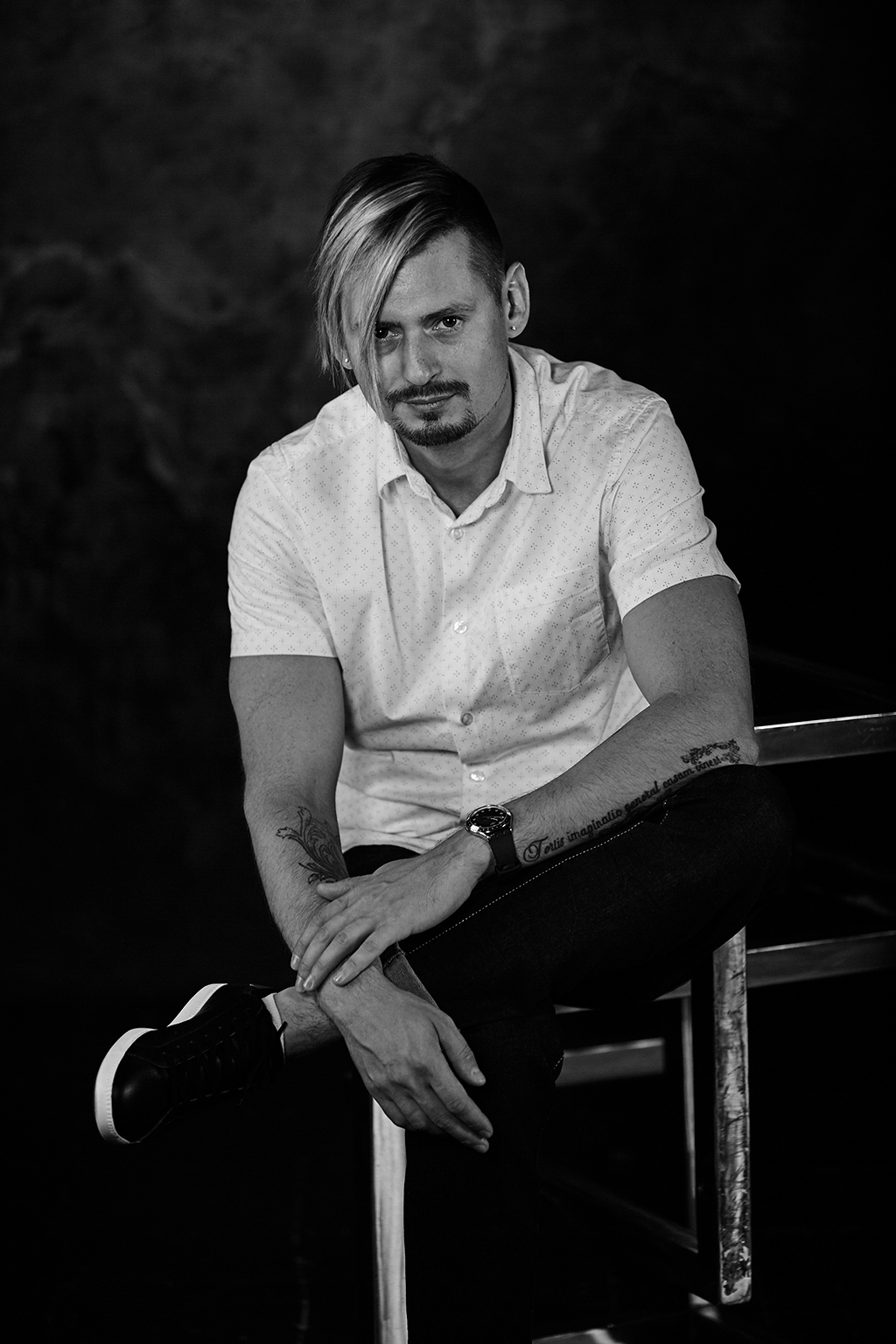
- Born: Sergei Alekseevich Savateev; 13 August 1983 (age 43); Leningrad, USSR
- Education: Peter the Great St. Petersburg Polytechnic University
- Occupations: interior designer, businessman
- Website: savateev-design.ru

Sergei Alekseevich Savateev (13 August 1983; Leningrad, USSR) is a Russian interior designer.

Savateev was born on 13 August 1983 in Leningrad, USSR. In 2006, he graduated from the Peter the Great St. Petersburg Polytechnic University, and by that time he had been employed with Almaz Central Marine Design Bureau in the position of an engineer for two years. After the completion of training, Savateev quit the engineering business and started a private designer practice as well as collaboration with architecture and design companies. In 2014, the studio was renamed into Savateev Design. Projects both in Russia and abroad have been completed: in Moscow, Saint Petersburg, Sochi, Ufa, the United States, Germany, Finland and Israel. His projects are regularly covered by interior-design magazines. In December 2019, Savateev won the National Design Championship of Russia, taking first place. Savateev is winner in Interior Space and Exhibition Design Category by A’Design Award & Competition.

== Awards ==
Year	Award	Category
2009	NEUHAUS, competition for the best interior design project	First degree diploma
2010	NEUHAUS, competition for the best interior design project	First degree diploma
2012	High Interior Style competition	3rd degree diploma in the Residential Interior category
2018	Golden Trezzini Awards for Architecture and Design, 2018	Special award
2018	Best Color in Interiors 2019, as part of the third quarter-finals of the National Design Championship	First place
2019	Golden Trezzini Awards for Architecture and Design, 2019	First place
2019	National Desigh Championship of Russia	First place
2020	A’Design Award & Competition (Interior Space and Exhibition Design Category)	First place
