= Project 22010 research vessel =

Russian research vessel class

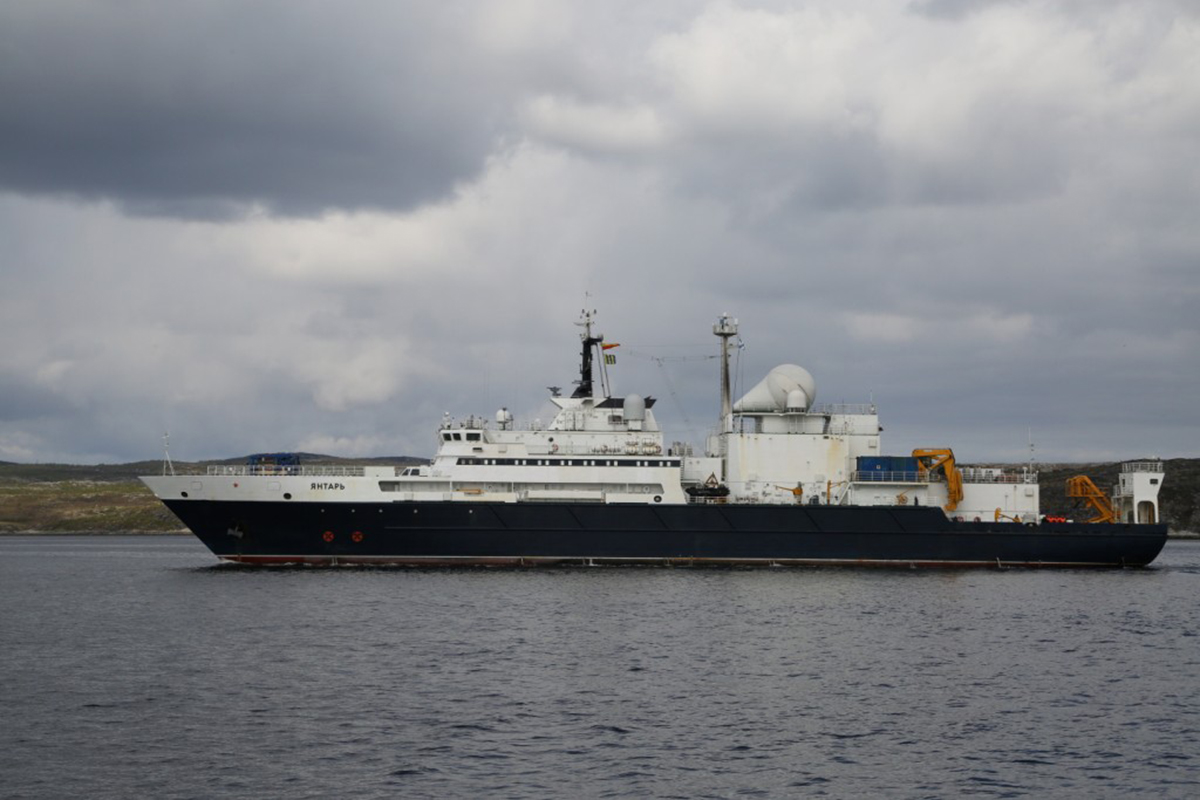
- Yantar

Class overview
- Name: Project 22010
- Builders: Yantar Shipyard, Kaliningrad; Vyborg Shipyard, Vyborg
- Operators: Russian Navy
- Built: 2010-present
- In commission: 2015–present
- Planned: 3
- Building: 1
- Completed: 2
- Active: 1

General characteristics
- Type: Research vessel
- Displacement: 5,736 tons (full load)
- Length: 107.8 m (354 ft); 116.3 m (382 ft) (Almaz)
- Beam: 17.2 m (56 ft)
- Propulsion: 2 × 3400 hp electric motors; 4 x 1600 kW diesel-generators; 2 x 1080 kW diesel-generators; 2 x azipods; 2 x bow thrusters
- Speed: 15 kn (28 km/h; 17 mph)
- Range: 8,000 nmi (15,000 km; 9,200 mi)
- Endurance: 60 days
- Boats & landing craft carried: 1 x Project 16810 autonomous underwater working vehicle; 1 x Project 16811 autonomous underwater working vehicle
- Complement: 60
- Aviation facilities: 1 x helipad (Yantar)

Project 22010 is a series of research vessels being built for the Russian Navy, developed by the Almaz Central Marine Design Bureau. While officially these vessels are intended for deep sea research and rescue operations, officials have alleged that these are spy ships intended for gathering intelligence and tampering with undersea communication cables.

== Ships ==
Name	Builder	Laid down	Launched	Commissioned	Fleet	Status
Yantar	Yantar Shipyard	8 July 2010	5 December 2012	23 May 2015	Northern Fleet	Active
Almaz	Yantar Shipyard	9 June 2016	October 2019		Pacific Fleet	Launched
Vice-admiral Burilichev	Vyborg Shipyard	6 February 2021				Laid down

== See also ==
- List of active Russian Navy ships
- List of research vessels by country
