= Project 11982 research ship =

Russian research vessel class

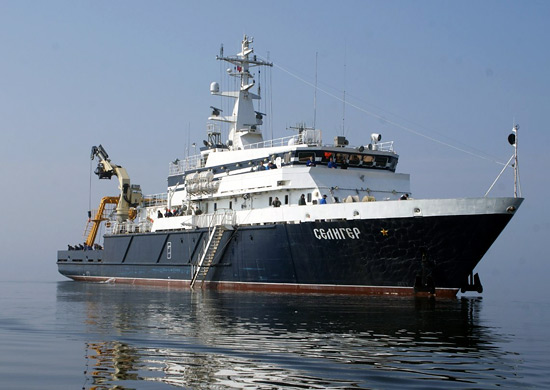
- Seliger in 2012

Class overview
- Name: Project 11982
- Builders: Yantar Shipyard, Kaliningrad; Pella Shipyard, Otradny
- Operators: Russian Navy
- Built: 2009-present
- In commission: 2012–present
- Planned: 3
- Building: 1
- Completed: 3
- Active: 2

General characteristics
- Type: Research vessel
- Displacement: 1,040 tons (full load) (Seliger); 1,165 tons (full load) (Ladoga and Ilmen)
- Length: 60.6 m (199 ft) (Seliger); 63.08 m (207.0 ft) (Ladoga and Ilmen)
- Beam: 10.8 m (35 ft)
- Draught: 3.4 m (11 ft) (Seliger); 3.8 m (12 ft) (Ladoga and Ilmen)
- Propulsion: 2 × 950 hp Rolls-Royce 12FP electric motors; 3 x 840 kW VA-840 diesel-generators; 2 x 280 kW VA-280 diesel-generators; 2 x azipods; 2 x bow thrusters
- Speed: 13.5 kn (25.0 km/h; 15.5 mph) (Seliger); 12 kn (22 km/h; 14 mph) (Ladoga and Ilmen)
- Range: 1,000 nmi (1,900 km; 1,200 mi)
- Endurance: 20 days
- Boats & landing craft carried: 1 x Type ARS-600 autonomous underwater working vehicle; Seliger: 1 x RT-2500 underwater vehicle; 1 x Super GNOME underwater vehicle; Ladoga: 1 x Gavia underwater vehicle; 1 x Marlin-RT underwater vehicle; 1 x Marlin-350 underwater vehicle
- Complement: 25 (Seliger); 36 (Ladoga and Ilmen)

Project 11982 is a series of research vessels being built for the Russian Navy, developed by the Almaz Central Marine Design Bureau. The primary mission of this class is to conduct hydrographic and oceanographic surveys, as well as research activities in deep waters.

== History ==
In November 2019, the Russian Ministry of Defence took the Pella Shipyard to court over delays to the project, with Ladoga being delivered to the Russian Navy two years behind schedule. The vessel Ilmen was scheduled to be handed over in 2018, however there has been no public information about its transfer to the navy.

== Ships ==
Name	Builder	Laid down	Launched	Commissioned	Fleet	Status
Seliger	Yantar Shipyard	8 July 2009	29 July 2011	25 December 2012	Black Sea Fleet	Active
Ladoga	Pella Shipyard	12 September 2014	29 July 2016	1 October 2018	Baltic Fleet	Active
Ilmen	Pella Shipyard	4 December 2014	5 December 2017			Launched

== Gallery ==
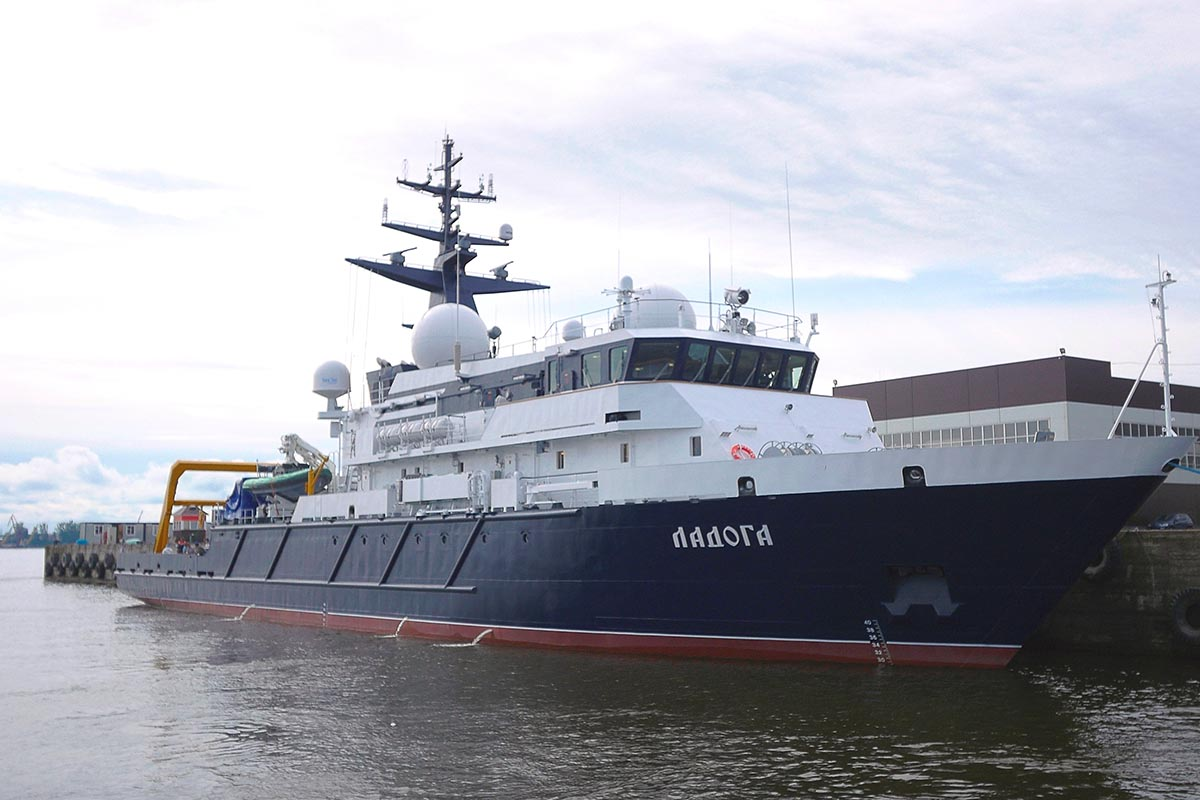
Ladoga during sea trials in 2018

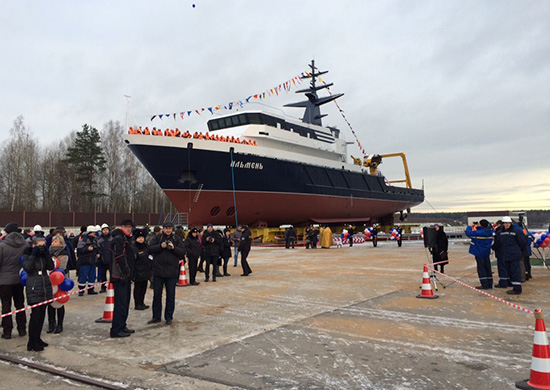
Ilmen being launched in 2017

== See also ==
- List of active Russian Navy ships
- List of research vessels by country
