= Magnar Norderhaug =

Norwegian zoologist and ecologist

Magnar Norderhaug (21 July 1939 – 22 April 2006) was a Norwegian zoologist and ecologist.

== Biography ==
He was a cand.real. by education. He worked at the Norwegian Polar Institute from 1967 to 1972, in Vestfold County Municipality from 1972 to 1973, as the Southern Norway inspector of nature protection from 1973 to 1985, then for the Norwegian Agency for Development Cooperation from 1985 to 1989. From 1989 he chaired the Nordic branch of the Worldwatch Institute. He was also among the founders of Greenpeace in Norway in 1988, as well as a board member of the Norwegian Society for the Conservation of Nature. He published several books.

He was proclaimed a Knight, First Class of the Royal Norwegian Order of St. Olav in 2004. He died in April 2006.
