= Jan-Gunnar Winther =

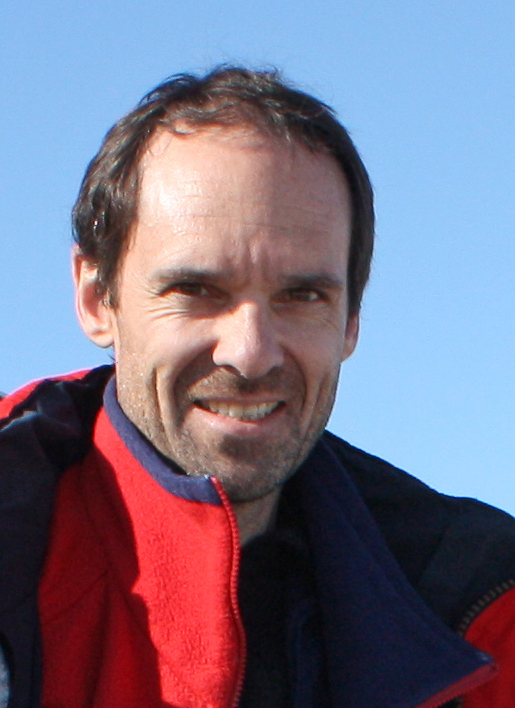
Jan-Gunnar Winther

Jan-Gunnar Winther (born 21 June 1962) is director for the Centre for the Ocean and the Arctic at UiT The Arctic University of Norway and Specialist Director at the Norwegian Polar Institute located in Tromsø. He served as Director of the Norwegian Polar Institute (2005-2017) and as pro-rector for research and development at UiT (2023-2025).

== Education ==
After obtaining a construction engineering degree in 1987 at the Norwegian Institute of Technology, Jan-Gunnar Winther gained a PhD in polar hydrology at the same institution in 1993 following a period of study at the University of British Columbia in Canada.

== Career ==
Winther began working at the Norwegian Polar Institute in 1994, and was its director from 2005 to 2017. From 2018, Winther was the director of the Centre for the Ocean and the Arctic under the Ministry of Trade, Industry and Fisheries. He was a researcher at SINTEF (Foundation for Scientific and Industrial Research) for six years, held a chair at the University Centre in Svalbard, and enrolled at the Norwegian Defence University College in 2003 and 2013. He was deputy head of the government-appointed “group of experts for the northern regions” under the second government of prime minister Jens Stoltenberg. He was the chair of the Board at Grid Arendal 2017-2023, is deputy chair of the Board of SALT, and Board member at Tromsø Research Foundation (2023-2025).

Winther led the first half of the Norwegian-American South Pole Expedition in the 2007–08 International Polar Year.

== Celebrations ==
Winther took the initiative leading to the Nansen-Amundsen Year in 2011, an official celebration with around 400 events nationally and internationally, acknowledging 150 years after Fridtjof Nansen was born and 100 years after Roald Amundsen reached the South Pole.

Winther participated in the anniversary expedition to the South Pole in 2011 along with Stein P. Aasheim, Harald Dag Jølle and Vegard Ulvang. The expedition followed the same route as Roald Amundsen’s expedition in 1911–12 and reached the Pole precisely 100 years after Amundsen as part of the celebration of the Nansen-Amundsen Year in 2011. In 2013, he led the International Nansen Memorial Expedition from Archangel to the Yenisei River aboard the former Russian research vessel Professor Molchanov.

Winther took part on behalf of Norway in the Olympic Torch Relay prior to the Winter Olympics in Sochi in 2014 when it visited the North Pole in October 2013.

Jan-Gunnar Winther proposed the Constitution Voyage in 2014 when the schooner, Anna Rogde, sailed from Hammerfest to Oslo as part of the celebrations of the bicentenary of the drawing up of the Norwegian Constitution in 1814, to underline its significance and the opportunities it opened up for the Norwegian coast, viewed from a historic aspect and in the perspective of what the future holds.

== Publications ==
Winther has published about 70 scientific articles, 200+ chronicles and three books, Klimagåten Antarktis (Antarctica, a climatic mystery), Norge i Antarktis (Norway in the Antarctic) and a children's book, Snø, is og klima (Snow, ice and climate), all three in 2008.

== Appointments ==
- one of the lead authors on the Intergovernmental Panel on Climate Change report ("Climate Change 2013: The Physical Science Basis")
- member of United Nations Global Compact Action Platform for Sustainable Ocean Business
- member of the World Economic Forum Friends of Ocean Action
- member of the China Council for Cooperation on Environment and Development (International Institute for Sustainable Development)
- member of the expert group of the High-level panel for a Sustainable Ocean Economy
- member of the Horizon Europe Mission Board Restore our Ocean and Waters
- a Norwegian expert on the Arctic Council and the Antarctic Treaty.
- member The United Arab Emirates Polar Program Board.

He is also a member of the Norwegian Academy of Technological Sciences and the Explorers Club.
