= Kronprins Haakon =

Norwegian icebreaking polar research vessel

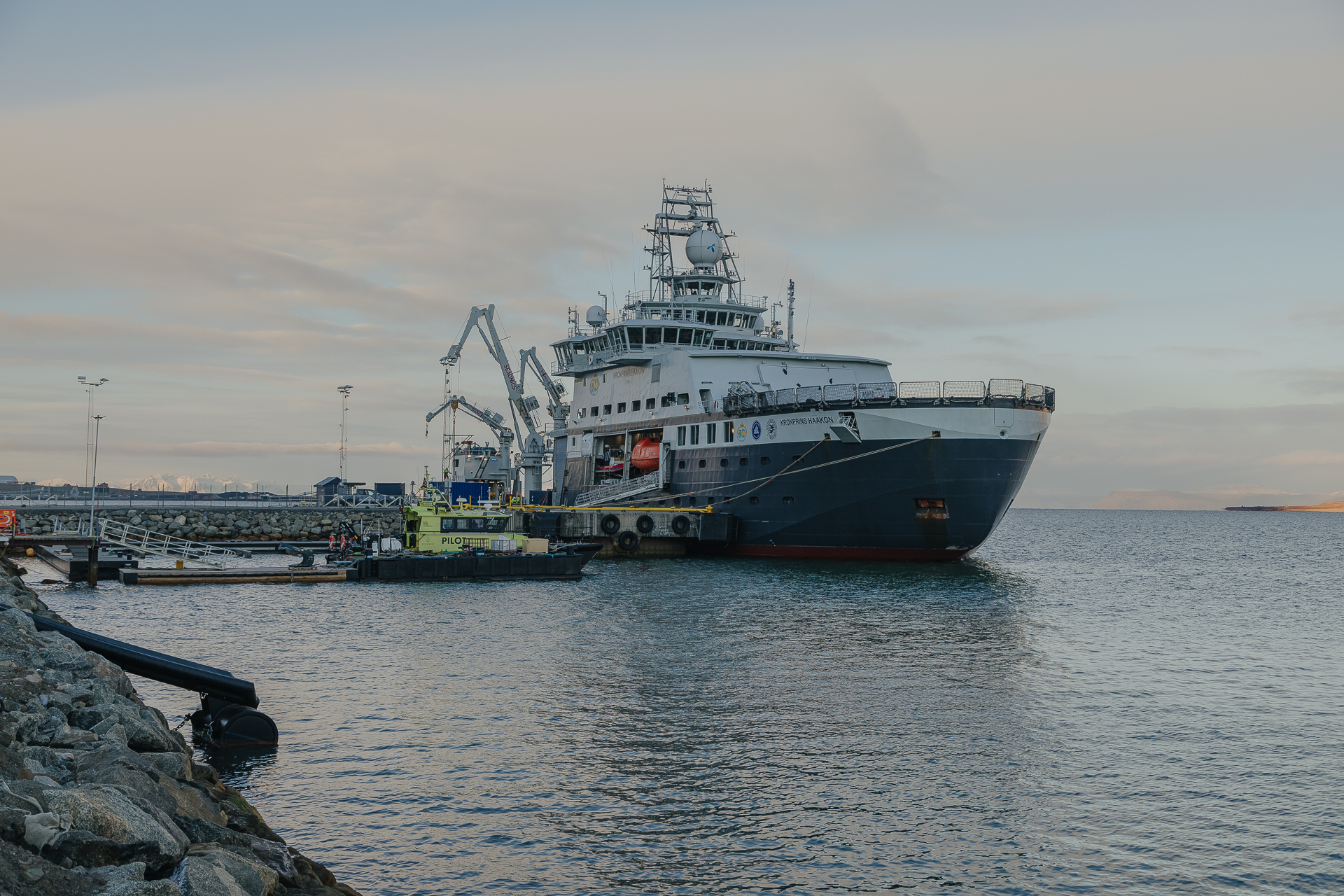
- Kronprins Haakon anchored in the port of Longyearbyen before the start of GoNorth expedition in 2022

History
- Name: Kronprins Haakon
- Namesake: Haakon, Crown Prince of Norway
- Owner: Norwegian Polar Institute
- Operator: Norwegian Institute of Marine Research
- Port of registry: Tromsø, Norway
- Ordered: 29 December 2013
- Builder: Fincantieri (La Spezia, Italy)
- Cost: NOK 1.4 billion
- Yard number: 6255
- Laid down: 2 September 2015
- Launched: 3 March 2017
- Completed: April 2018
- Identification: IMO number: 9739587; MMSI number: 257275000; Call sign: 3YYQ
- Status: In service

General characteristics
- Type: Research vessel
- Tonnage: 9,145 GT
- Length: 100.382 m (329 ft 4.0 in)
- Beam: 21 m (68 ft 11 in)
- Draught: 8.666 m (28 ft 5.2 in)
- Depth: 10.408 m (34 ft 1.8 in)
- Ice class: Polar Class 3 Icebreaker
- Installed power: 2 × Bergen B32:40L6 (2 × 3,500 kW); 2 × Bergen B32:40L9 (2 × 5,000 kW)
- Propulsion: Diesel-electric; two Rolls-Royce US ARC 0.8 FP azimuth thrusters (2 × 5.5 MW); Two bow thrusters (2 × 1.1 MW)
- Range: 15,000 nmi (28,000 km; 17,000 mi)
- Endurance: 65 days at cruising speed
- Capacity: Accommodation for 55 in 38 cabins; 1,180 m^{3} (42,000 cu ft) cargo hold; 20 TEU containers
- Crew: 15–17
- Aviation facilities: Helipad and hangar

Kronprins Haakon is a Norwegian icebreaking polar research vessel owned by the Norwegian Polar Institute. The shiptime use is divided between the main users, The Arctic University of Norway (50%), Norwegian Polar Institute (30%) and Norwegian Institute of Marine Research (20%). She was built at Fincantieri shipyard in Genova, Italy, and delivered in 2018.

== Technical details ==
With a length of 100.382 metres (329 ft 4.0 in), beam of 21 metres (68 ft 11 in) and draft of 8.666 metres (28 ft 5.2 in), Kronprins Haakon is the largest Norwegian icebreaker ever built despite being slightly shorter than NoCGV Svalbard, the 6,375-ton icebreaking offshore patrol vessel operated by the Norwegian Coast Guard. The research vessel has accommodation for 55 personnel in 38 cabins, including a crew of 15 to 17. She is equipped with a hangar for two small to medium-sized helicopters, but the helipad in the bow is strengthened also for the heavier helicopters such as NHIndustries NH90 operated by the Norwegian Coast Guard and Eurocopter AS332 Super Puma search and rescue (SAR) helicopters based in Svalbard.

Like most modern icebreakers, Kronprins Haakon has a diesel-electric propulsion system. Her power plant consists of two 3,500 kW six-cylinder Bergen B32:40L6 and two 5,000 kW 9-cylinder Bergen B32:40L9 medium-speed diesel engines that produce power for two 5.5 MW Rolls-Royce US ARC 0.8 FP azimuth thrusters and two 1.1 MW bow thrusters. The propulsion system also gives her Dynamic Positioning (DP) Class 1 stationkeeping capability. In open water, she has a maximum cruising range of 15,000 nautical miles (28,000 km; 17,000 mi) and endurance of 65 days at cruising speed. The bollard pull of the vessel is 158 tonnes.

The hull of Kronprins Haakon is strengthened according to International Association of Classification Societies (IACS) Unified Requirements for Polar Class Ships for operations in winter ice with pressure ridges, multi-year ice, and glacial ice inclusions. Her ice class, Polar Class 3, is intended for vessels designed for "year-round operation in second-year ice which may include multi-year ice inclusions". During full-scale ice trials north of Svalbard, Kronprins Haakon was found out to be capable of breaking 1-metre (3 ft 3 in) ice with a 20-centimetre (8 in) snow layer at a continuous speed of 4 knots (7.4 km/h; 4.6 mph) at full propulsion power, slightly exceeding her contractual requirements. Ridges up to 8 metres (26 ft) in thickness were successfully broken by ramming.

A high-end research vessel, Kronprins Haakon has an extensive scientific outfit for oceanography, marine biology, and geology. The main deck is largely dedicated to scientific activities with 15 fixed and three container laboratories, refrigerated storage rooms, large working deck with cranes and an A-frame for trawling, and a hangar and 3-by-4-metre (10 by 13 ft) moon pool for sampling as well as AUV and ROV operations. Underwater acoustics instrumentation is fitted in two drop keels as well as special "arctic tanks" for operations in ice-covered seas.

== Development and construction ==
In 1999, the Norwegian Polar Institute issued a proposal for acquiring a new research vessel to replace the 1978-built Lance, a former fishing and sealing vessel that had been rebuilt as a research vessel in 1992. After a feasibility study was completed in 2007, the design contract was awarded to Rolls-Royce Marine (today Kongsberg Maritime Ship Design) in 2008. The initial design was further developed in close cooperation with the Norwegian Polar Institute and other future users of the research vessel and the Kongsberg Ship Design UT 395 vessel concept was approved by the Norwegian Ministry of Finance in 2011. The funding for the construction of the new research vessel was approved by the Norwegian Parliament and included in the 2013 budget.

On 29 November 2013, the construction of the NOK 1.4 billion (approximately 175 million euro) polar research vessel was awarded to the Italian shipbuilder Fincantieri and the shipbuilding contract was signed on 19 December. The vessel, named Kronprins Haakon after Haakon, Crown Prince of Norway, would be built by Genova-based Riva Trigoso-Muggiano shipyard. Final outfitting and sea trials would be carried out at Fincantieri-owned VARD in Norway.

The first steel for the new Norwegian polar research vessel was cut on 15 June 2015 and the keel was laid on 2 September. Kronprins Haakon, named after the crown prince of Norway, was launched on 3 March 2017 and delivered in April 2018.

The main user of the vessel will be University of Tromsø, also known as the Arctic University of Norway.

Kongsberg Maritime Ship Design later used the experience gained from designing the Norwegian polar research vessel to develop the RRS Sir David Attenborough for the British Antarctic Survey.

== Career ==
One of the primary users of the new Norwegian polar research vessel is the Nansen Legacy project which will include over 370 ship-days by 2020 primarily on Kronprins Haakon. In addition, the vessel will regularly sail to the Antarctic.

In July 2019, one of Kronprins Haakon's propulsion units developed a lubricating oil leak during icebreaking operations north of Svalbard, forcing the research vessel to cancel a scientific cruise ahead of schedule and return to Norway for repairs. During inspection in Harstad, the cause of the leak was discovered to be a loose bolt in the port side propeller shaft seal. There were no visible signs of damage and the repairs consisted of tightening the bolts in both port and starboard propulsion units and securing them with thread-locking fluid. The scientific cruises were resumed in August.

On 28 July 2022, Kronprins Haakon arrived at the North Pole for the first time, becoming the second Norwegian vessel (after NoCGV Svalbard) to reach the northernmost point on the Earth. Although the ice conditions were reportedly easier than expected, the research vessel was sailing together with the French icebreaking cruise ship Le Commandant Charcot operated by Compagnie du Ponant.

On 11 and 12 September 2023, while being followed by the Norwegian Coast Guard vessel NoCGV Barentshav in the Fram Strait, the Russian spy ship Yantar closely followed Kronprins Haakon for 16.5 hours. The Russian ship was operating without AIS and would overtly copy all of Kronprins Haakon's stops and movements, at one point closing to a distance of 200–370 metres. While the Norwegian Polar Institute characterised the incident as "harassment", and the Royal Norwegian Navy reportedly keeps a close eye on the Russian intelligence vessel, all relevant Norwegian authorities assessed that Yantar acted in accordance with international maritime law.

In September 2025, the research vessel Kronprins Haakon reached the North Pole as part of the international Arctic Ocean Expedition 2025, led by UiT The Arctic University of Norway, NORCE, and the University of Bergen.
