= Konsul-class submersible =

Russian Navy deep sea submergence vehicle

Class overview
- Name: Consul class DSV
- Builders: Admiralty Shipyard
- Operators: Russian Navy
- Preceded by: Mir
- Built: 1992–2011
- In service: 2001–present
- Completed: 2
- Active: 2

General characteristics
- Type: Deep-submergence vehicle
- Displacement: 25 tonnes (25 long tons)
- Length: 8.4 m (27 ft 7 in)
- Beam: 3.9 m (12 ft 10 in)
- Height: 3.9 m (12 ft 10 in)
- Speed: 3.3 knots (6.1 km/h; 3.8 mph) maximum; 2.3 knots (4.3 km/h; 2.6 mph) cruise
- Endurance: 10–12 hours
- Test depth: 6,000 m (20,000 ft)
- Capacity: 1 passenger/mission specialist
- Crew: 2

Consul-class DSV (project 1681x) is a class of two deep-submergence vehicles (DSVs) built by the Russian Navy and operated by the Navy's Main Underwater Research Directorate. Conceived in the late 1980s, they are a military counterpart to the better known, strictly civilian Mir submersibles. The first ship in the class, AS-37 Rus, is built to the original project 18610, while the second one, AS-39 Consul, is of the updated project 16811 design, though Rus was later upgraded to the pr. 16811 specs.

== Project history ==
Soviet Navy issued the technical requirements for the military DSV back in 1984, and the design was assigned to the Malakhit design bureau, one of the leading Soviet submarine specialists, with the final drafts for the project 16810 completed and approved by 1989. During the design process the Ministry of Geology also showed the interest in similar DSV for marine shelf geological research, so the drafts were updated to comply with civilian USSR Register of Shipping requirements, and some additional upgrades were incorporated into them, resulting in the updated project 16811. Both ships were laid up in Admiralty Shipyard in 1989, but while the Navy order (commissioned later as AS-37 Rus) was largely completed before the funding dried up in the mid-1990s (and even then the construction continued whenever the funds were available), the Ministry of Geology order was plagued by bureaucratic red tape, especially the statute forbidding Rosnedra, its successor, to engage in R&D. Rus was eventually completed in 1999 and commissioned in 2001, while Consul continued to sit in the yard until Rosnedra agreed to transfer its ownership to the Navy, with the provision of making it available for geological research when necessary. This allowed the resumption of the submersible's construction and by 2009 it was finally completed. Meanwhile, Rus underwent an upgrade to bring its specs to the project 16811. By late 2011 both ships completed their testing, including dives to the project depth of 6000 m, surpassing it by several hundreds of meters, and Consul was commissioned into the Navy. Originally they operated from various ad hoc tenders, but in December 2012 their dedicated tender, R/V Yantar, was launched by Yantar shipyard in Kaliningrad.

== Design ==
The ships are of the conventional DSV design, with a spherical habitable pressure hull of 2.1 metres (6.9 ft) diameter and 100 millimetres (3.9 in) thickness welded from titanium alloy, with buoyancy provided by domestically produced syntactic foam. Habitable hull fits two crew with an optional passenger/mission specialist, and is equipped with three viewports in the frontal side and external cameras. Pressure hull assembly is hydrostatically tested to withstand 720 atm, while the viewports are tested up to 780 atm. Propulsion is supplied by three main engines with ducted propellers in the stern, while two additional vertical and one lateral impellers ensure the maneuverability. Both ships are equipped with two heavy-duty robotic arms, capable of handling up to 200 kg loads, and are able to carry and control ROVs. The endurance is mainly limited by capacity of their main batteries, which are capable of holding enough charge for 10–12 hours of operation.
