= Olav Orheim =

Norwegian glaciologist

- Born: 22 February 1942 (age 84); Bergen, Norway
- Education: Ohio State University
- Occupation: Glaciologist
- Employer: Norwegian Polar Institute

Olav Orheim (born 22 February 1942) is a Norwegian glaciologist. He served as director of the Norwegian Polar Institute from 1993 to 2005. He was appointed associate professor in glaciology at the University of Bergen in 1989. Orheim was a central participant in the establishment of the research station Troll in Queen Maud Land in Antarctica. Orheim has probably landed atop more icebergs than anyone in the world and was once stranded overnight on one with David Attenborough, the English broadcaster and voice of the nature series "Planet Earth".
