= Nils Are Øritsland =

Norwegian scientist (1939–2006)

Nils Are Øritsland (5 August 1939 – 24 November 2006) was a Norwegian polar researcher in animal physiology and ecology. Øritsland received his PhD in 1976 from the University of Oslo. He was director of the Norwegian Polar Institute from 1991 to 1993. In 1980, Øritsland conducted a controversial study into the effects of oil spills on polar bears that resulted in the deaths of polar bears after they ingested crude oil.

== Selected works ==
- Lavigne, D. M. and Øritsland, N. A. (1974) Ultraviolet photography: a new application for remote sensing of mammals, Can J. Zool. 52, 939–943
- Lavigne, D. M. and Øritsland, N. A. (1974) Black polar bears, Nature 251, 218–219
- Øritsland, N. A. and Ronald, K. (1978) Solar heating of mammals: Observations of hair transmittance, Int. J. Biometeor. 22, 197–201
- Øritsland, N. A. (1986) Svalbardreinen og dens livsgrunnlag, Universitetsforlaget, ISBN 82-00-07728-4
- Øritsland, N. A. (1990) Starvation survival and body composition in mammals with particular reference to Homo sapiens. Bulletin of Mathematical Biology 52, 643–655
