= Georg Indrevik =

Norwegian politician (1939–2023)

- Born: 18 August 1939
- Died: 23 June 2023 (aged 83)
- Occupation: Politician

Georg Indrevik (18 August 1939 – 23 June 2023) was a Norwegian politician for the Progress Party.

Indrevik served as a deputy representative to the Norwegian Parliament from Hordaland during the terms 2001–2005 and 2005–2009. In total he met during 77 days of parliamentary session. On the local level, he was the deputy mayor of Fjell Municipality. Due to the death of mayor Lars Lie on 9 June 2010, Indrevik served as acting mayor of Fjell until Eli Årdal Berland took over on 24 June. His son, Tom Georg Indrevik, is the current mayor of Øygarden Municipality.

Georg Indrevik died on 23 June 2023, at the age of 83.
