= Kari Wærness =

Norwegian sociologist (1939–2026)

- Born: 13 January 1939; Leknes, Norway
- Died: 13 September 2026 (aged 87)
- Education: University of Bergen
- Occupation: Sociologist
- Awards: Order of St. Olav (2017)

Kari Wærness (13 January 1939 – 13 September 2026) was a Norwegian sociologist. Her research focused on women and gender studies, family and caring.

== Background ==
Wærness was born in Leknes on 13 January 1939, to Einar Loe and Aslaug Marie Eidsvåg. She married physician Endre Wærness in 1962.

Wærness died on 13 September 2026, at the age of 87.

== Career ==
Wærness graduated as cand.mag. in 1962 from the University of Bergen. Along with her husband she settled in Mosjøen, where she worked as teacher in mathematics in secondary school until 1967. Back in Bergen, she started studying sociology and political science, and graduated as cand.polit. in 1972. From 1974 she was appointed at the Institute for Sociology at the University of Bergen, from 1987 as professor. Along with others, she started the first center for women's research in Norway in 1978, and she chaired the Center for Women and Gender Research (SKOK) in Bergen from 1999 to 2005.

She was decorated Knight, First Class of the Order of St. Olav in 2017.

== Select works ==
- Kvinners omsorgsarbeid i den ulønnete produksjon. 1975.
- Et program for omsorgsforskning. 1989.
