= Snøfrid Skaare =

Norwegian politician (born 1939)

Snøfrid Skaare (born 26 September 1939) is a Norwegian politician for the Conservative Party.

She served as a deputy representative to the Norwegian Parliament from Oppland during the term 1993–1997.

On the local level, Skaare has been a member of the municipal council for Nord-Fron Municipality. She lives in Vinstra.
