= Ola Hunderi =

Norwegian physicist

Ola David Raa Hunderi (4 February 1939 – 13 June 2016) was a Norwegian physicist.

He took the dr.philos. degree in 1970, and was appointed as professor at the Norwegian Institute of Technology in 1981. From 1987 to 1993 he was the research director at SINTEF.
