= Norwegian Polar Institute =

Norwegian government agency

- Norsk Polarinstitutt
- Emblem

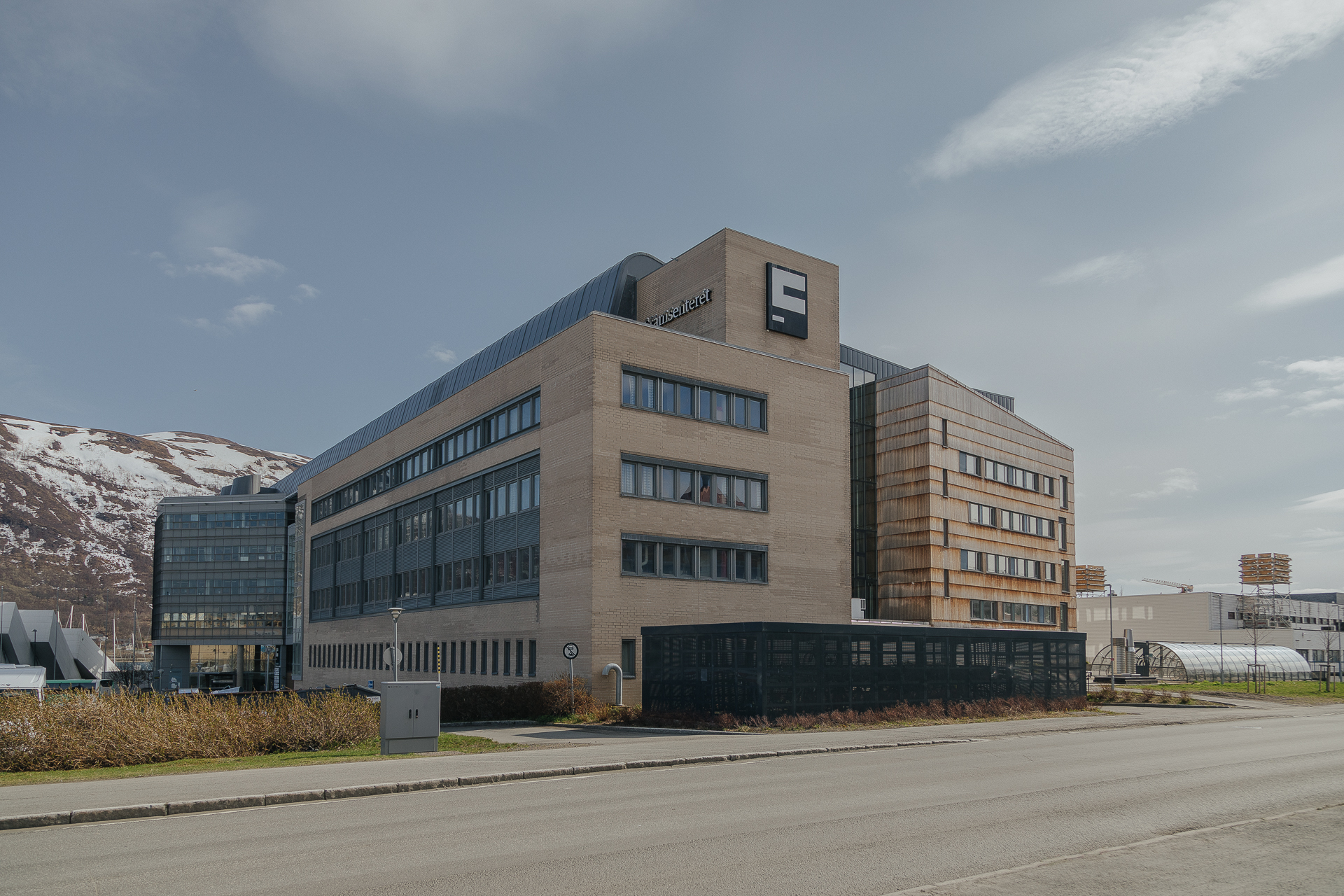
- The Norwegian Polar Institute's office building in Tromsø
- Abbreviation: NPI
- Parent organization: Ministry of Climate and Environment
- Staff: 165
- Website: www.npolar.no

The Norwegian Polar Institute (NPI; Norwegian: Norsk Polarinstitutt) is Norway's central governmental institution for scientific research, mapping and environmental monitoring in the Arctic and the Antarctic. The NPI is a directorate under Norway's Ministry of Climate and Environment. The institute advises Norwegian authorities on matters concerning polar environmental management and is the official environmental management body for Norwegian activities in Antarctica.

== Activities ==
The institute's activities are focused on environmental research and management in the polar regions. The NPI's researchers investigate biodiversity, climate and environmental toxins in the Arctic and Antarctic, and in this context the institute equips and organizes large-scale expeditions to both polar regions. The institute contributes to national and international climate work, and is an active contact point for the international scientific community. The institute collects and analyses data on the environment and cultural heritage sites on the islands of Svalbard and Jan Mayen through the project Environmental Monitoring of Svalbard and Jan Mayen (MOSJ). Topographic mapping is also an important task: the NPI is the national surveying and mapping authority for Norway's polar areas, including non-commercial geological surveys.

In Antarctica, the institute is responsible for the management of all Norwegian activities. This means that all Norwegian subjects planning activities in Antarctica must first contact the NPI.

The NPI maintains a database of reported sightings of whales, walruses, seals, and polar bears in the Svalbard area to which the public is encouraged to contribute. The reported sightings are used in research and monitoring.

The NPI is the official agency responsible for place names in the Norwegian polar regions. These areas include Svalbard and Jan Mayen and their adjacent waters, Queen Maud Land, Bouvet Island, and Peter I Island. Place names are officially adopted by the responsible committee at the NPI, which maintains a database of place names that is publicly searchable.

== History ==
The NPI was established in 1948 under the Norwegian Ministry of Industry, but must be seen as an extension of Norwegian Svalbard and Arctic Ocean Survey, Norges Svalbard og Ishavsundersøkelser (NSIU), which was founded on 1 March 1928. Previously, Norway's Svalbard research had been organized as the Norwegian state-supported Spitsbergen Expeditions, with roots dating back to 1906. With the establishment of the NSIU, Norwegian research activity in eastern Greenland increased.

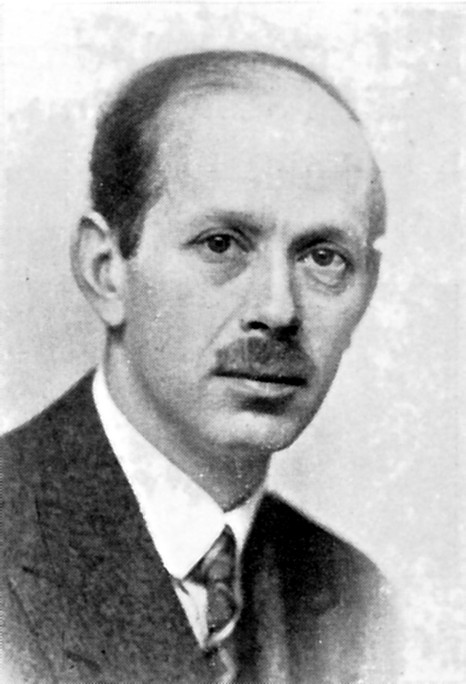
Harald Sverdrup, the first director of the NPI

With Harald Sverdrup as the first director, the NPI's mandate included Antarctica and was considerably broader than that of its forerunner, the NSIU. From 1949 to 1952, the NPI led the multinational Maudheim Expedition to Antarctica and had a base in Queen Maud Land from 1956 to 1960 (Norway Station), during the International Geophysical Year, also known as the third International Polar Year. The NPI established the permanent research station Troll in Antarctica in 1989–90; Troll has been operated as a year-round research station since 2005. The NPI carried out annual summer expeditions to Svalbard and, starting in 1968, has had a year-round research station in Ny-Ålesund. In 1979, the NPI became a directorate under the Ministry of the Environment (currently the Ministry of Climate and Environment).

In 1993, the decision was made in the Norwegian Parliament to move the headquarters of the NPI from Oslo, Norway's capital, to Tromsø, a coastal city north of the Arctic Circle. The process was completed in 1998. This relocation led to changes in the institute's profile and areas of interest as departments were reorganized, new personnel recruited, new positions established and research priorities shifted.

== Research platforms ==
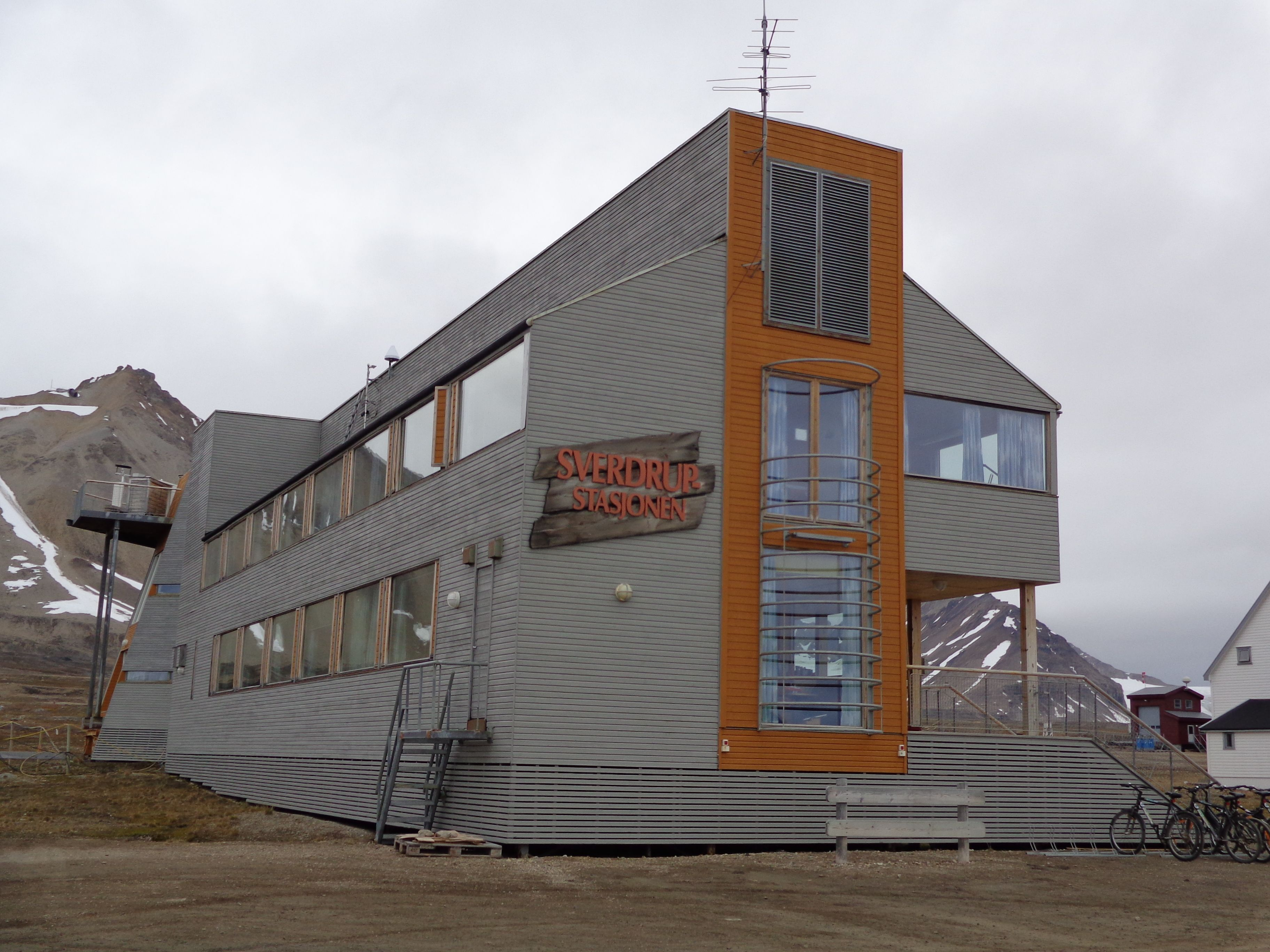
Sverdrup Station in Svalbard

The NPI runs the Sverdrup Station and the Zeppelin Observatory in Svalbard, the Troll and Tor research stations in Antarctica, and Norvegia Station on Bouvet Island.

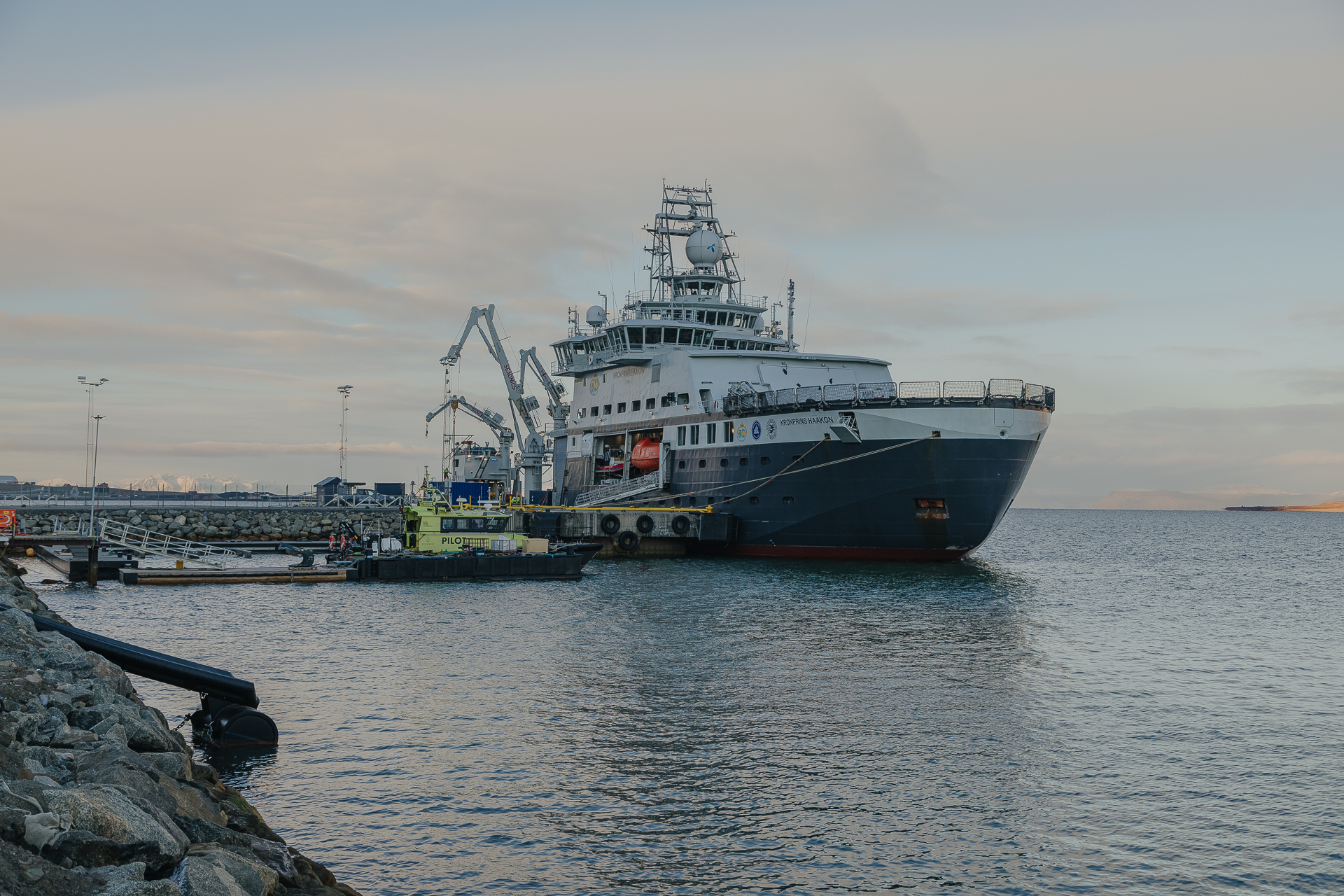
Research vessel Kronprins Haakon co-owned by the institute in the port of Longyearbyen at the start of GoNorth expedition

The NPI owns the research vessel Kronprins Haakon, with the University of Tromsø and the Norwegian Institute of Marine Research being the other users of the vessel.

== Archives ==
The NPI has built up a sizeable polar history collection in the form of photographs, books, journals and other archival materials.

The Library contains unique collections of polar history literature, including more than 15,000 books as well as diaries, ship registers and logbooks, newspaper cuttings and special collections, for example, a special collection pertaining to Umberto Nobile.

The Photo Library contains pictures from polar expeditions, mapping in Svalbard, Greenland and Antarctica, research (including geology, glaciology, biology and oceanography) and commercial activities such as mining in Svalbard, seal hunting in the White Sea, whaling in the Southern Ocean and trapping in Greenland and Svalbard. The collection consists of about 90,000 photographs, including some 60,000 historical photographs. The rest are modern images documenting research activity in Svalbard and Antarctica and adjacent marine areas. A large part of the collection is accessible to the public via the NPI's online image archive.

== Directors ==
No.	Portrait	Name	Term of office	
1		Harald Sverdrup	1948	1957
2		Anders K. Orvin	1957	1960
3		Tore Gjelsvik	1960	1983
4		Odd Rogne	1983	1991
5		Nils Are Øritsland	1991	1993
6		Olav Orheim	1993	2005
7		Jan-Gunnar Winther	2005	2017
8		Ole Arve Misund	2017	2023
8		Camilla Brekke	2023	Incumbent
