= Jon Hellesnes =

Norwegian philosopher, novelist and essayist

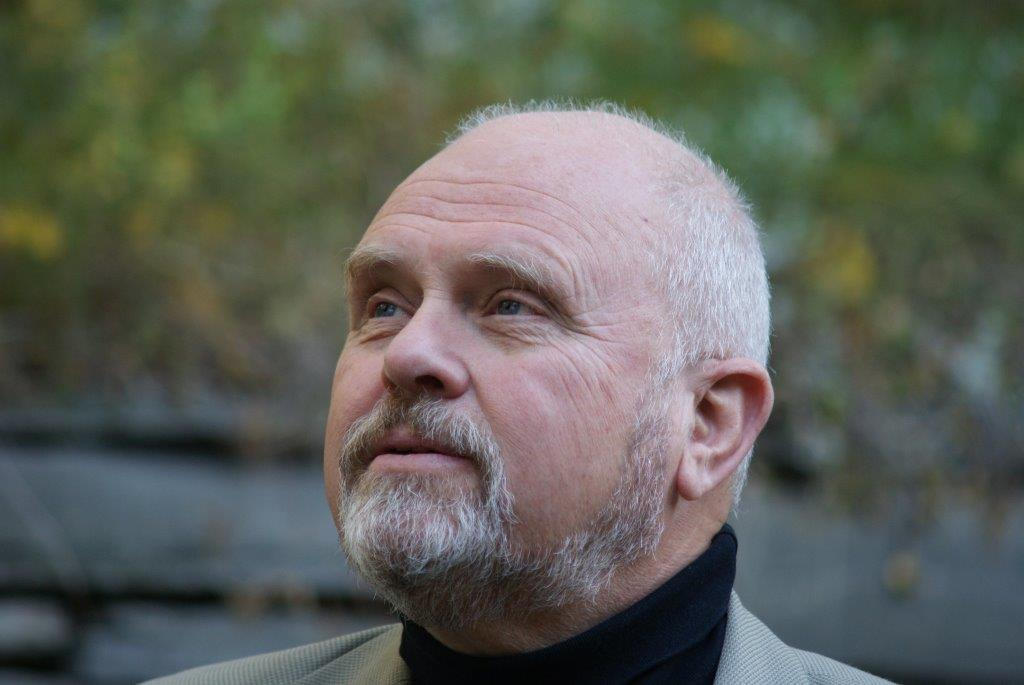
Jon Hellesnes

Jon Hellesnes (born 16 September 1939) is a Norwegian philosopher, novelist and essayist.

He was appointed professor of philosophy at the University of Tromsø in 1985. He is a member of the Norwegian Academy of Science and Letters.

== Selected bibliography ==
This is a list of his most notable works:

=== Academic ===
- Sosialisering og teknokrati (1975)
- Jakta etter svikaren (1978)
- Hermeneutikk og kultur (1988)
- René Descartes (1999)
- Om Hans Skjervheim (1999)

=== Other ===
- Carolus, klovnen (novel, 1982)
- Farar i metropolis (essays, 1984)
- Den postmoderne anstalten (novel, 1986)
- Maska bak andletet (essays, 2002)
- Illusjon? (essays, 2004)
- Om livstolkning (essays, 2007).
