= Per Spook =

Norwegian fashion designer (born 1939)

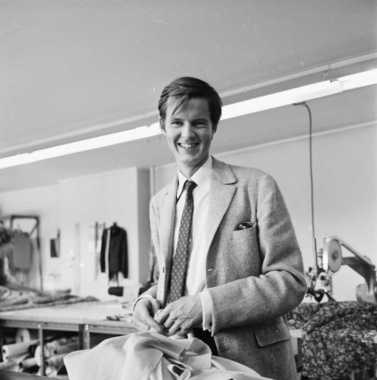
- Per Spook in 1965
- Born: 2 July 1939 (age 87); Oslo, Norway.
- Occupation: Fashion designer
- Partner: Gilles Jonemann
- Awards: Order of St. Olav (2003)

Per Spook (born 2 July 1939 in Oslo.) is a Norwegian fashion designer. He was awarded Aiguille d'Or (The Golden Needle) in 1978, and Dé d'Or (The Golden Thimble) in 1993. He was decorated Knight, First Class of the Royal Norwegian Order of St. Olav in 2003.

== Early life and education ==
After studying fashion at the Norwegian School of Arts, Crafts and Design in Oslo, where he graduated, Per Spook arrived in Paris at the age of 20, where he entered the Chambre Syndicale de la Mode school. He then worked as a freelance designer for several fashion houses, such as Christian Dior and Saint-Laurent, before joining Louis Féraud, where he worked for fifteen years, notably as the head of the creative studio.

In 1977 he opened his own fashion house in Paris and the following year he received the Golden Needle for the most creative collection for autumn/winter 1978–1979. He also received the Gullfingerbølet for this collection.

In 1979, Per Spook experienced growing success and organized his business around two separate companies :

- Per Spook Paris S.A., for haute couture with Bertrand Djian as CEO.
- Per Spook Rive Droite S.A., for ready to wear (Rive Droite being a nod to Saint Laurent Rive Gauche).

In 1980 he opened a boutique on Avenue George V.

In 1995, after opening a new boutique on Avenue Montaigne, he closed the fashion house in Paris.

He then worked in Japan, where he designed and created ready-to-wear clothing under his own name in Japan every year.

Spook is known for his love of black and white. His exhibitions are often marked by themes such as graphic patterns and inspiration from Nordic nature and climate. In 2003 he was awarded the Order of St. Olav. He received the Norwegian fashion industry's honorary in 2005.

He published a first book entitled "Per Spook, Haute couture 1977-1995" in which he photographed his 18 years of designs himself.
