= Kristin K. Devold =

Norwegian politician (born 1939)

Kristin K. Devold (born 2 October 1939) is a Norwegian politician for the Conservative Party.

She served as a deputy representative to the Norwegian Parliament from Møre og Romsdal during the term 1989–1993. In total she met during 27 days of parliamentary session.
