= GoNorth expedition =

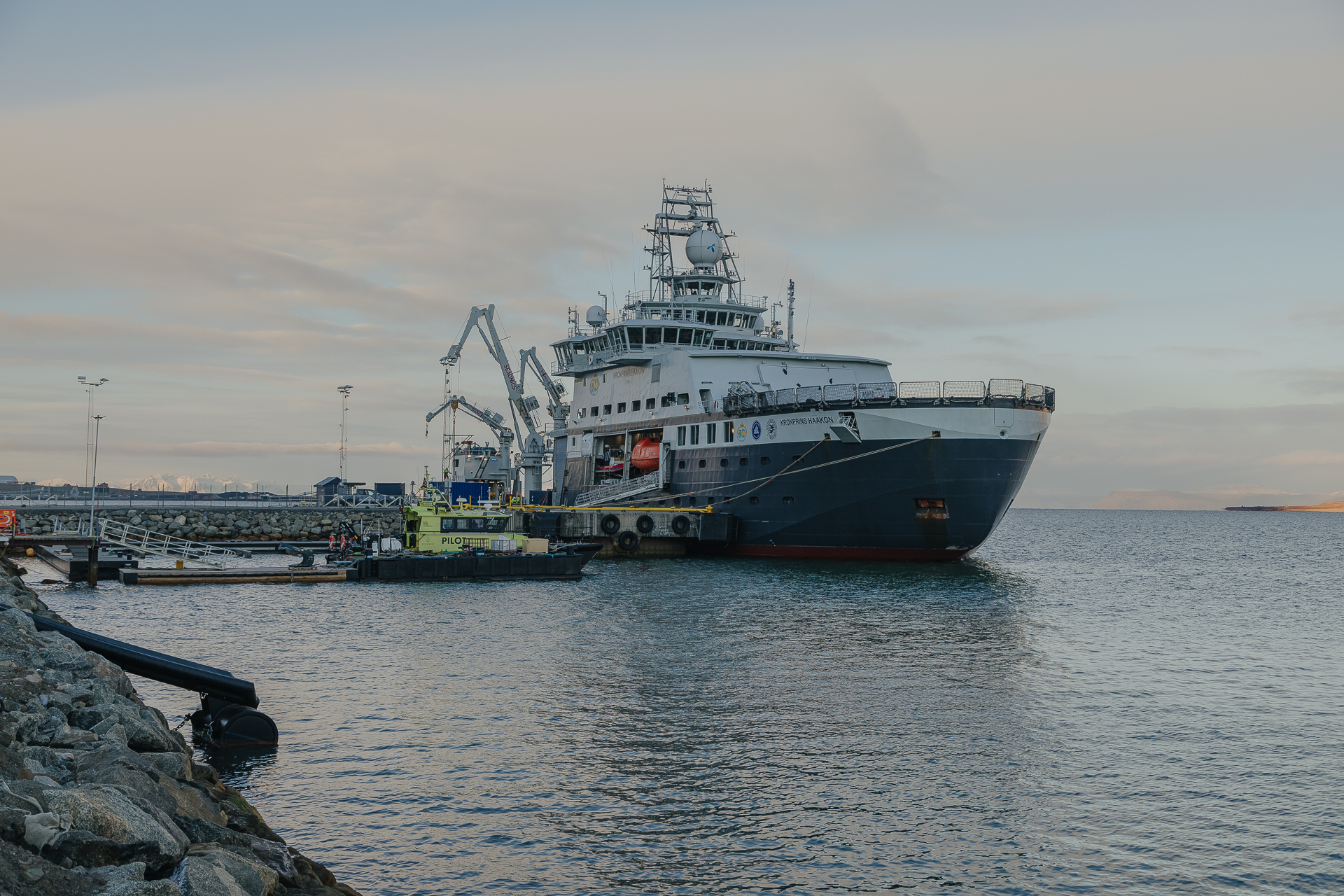
- Kronprins Haakon anchored in the port of Longyearbyen before the start of the GoNorth expedition in 2022
- Country: Norway
- Start: Longyearbyen, Svalbard; 2022
- End: 2025
- Goal: Arctic geoscience research in the central Arctic Ocean
- Ships: Kronprins Haakon
- Achievements: Discovery of a hydrothermal field in the Lena Trough

GoNorth (full name GoNorth: Geosciences in the Northern Arctic) is a Norwegian multidisciplinary Arctic research programme that included a series of expeditions into the central Arctic Ocean in 2022, 2023, and 2024. The programme aims to explore the Arctic Ocean — its seabed geology, the water column, sea ice, and biological components. The programme is planned to run until 2025.

GoNorth is notable for its multidisciplinary approach and for carrying out annual expeditions north of Svalbard, Greenland, and across the Gakkel Ridge. In 2023, the expedition team discovered a new hydrothermal field in the Lena Trough between Svalbard and Greenland.

== Background ==
Norway has an extended continental shelf in the Arctic Ocean, but scientific knowledge of this region remains limited due to harsh ice conditions and remoteness. GoNorth was established to fill gaps in geological, oceanographic, and climate records, while also contributing to international Arctic science. The programme builds on Norway’s polar research heritage, but with a stronger emphasis on seabed geology and continental margin processes.

== Expeditions ==
=== 2022 expedition ===
The GoNorth 2022 expedition aboard Kronprins Haakon consisted of two legs. Leg 1 took place from 14 October to 3 November 2022 and focused on the continental margin north of Svalbard and the Nansen Basin. Professor Jan Sverre Laberg from the UiT Arctic University of Norway was the cruise leader. The scientific programme combined geophysical surveys with oceanographic, biological, sediment and sea-ice observations. A 242 km seismic-refraction profile was acquired using 24 ocean-bottom seismometers, together with two multichannel seismic-reflection profiles, L3 and L9B. One of the main questions of geological surveys was to determine when the Fram Strait opened, and warm Atlantic water began to flow into the Arctic Ocean. Preliminary results also indicated that the Nansen Basin has a 4 km thick oceanic crust, challenging previous hypotheses.

Sea-ice work was conducted at two ice stations and included measurements of ice thickness, temperature, salinity, density and texture. The first station sampled approximately 1.1 m thick second-year ice, while the second sampled approximately 0.3 m thick first-year ice. Ice cores were co-located with borehole-jack measurements of confined mechanical strength, while additional cores were collected for DNA and diatom analyses. Other multidisciplinary work included seawater and sediment sampling, plankton sampling, continuous methane measurements and biological sampling of sediments, seawater and sea ice. A seafloor lander and an ocean glider were deployed for approximately two weeks, alongside CTD observations. Subsequent analysis showed relatively low metre-scale variability in several physical properties of the sampled ice, while the confined strength of the second-year ice showed substantially greater spatial variability than that of the first-year ice.

Leg 2 took place from 4 to 19 November 2022 and focused on the northern Knipovich Ridge and adjacent areas. Its main objectives were to locate, map and sample hydrothermal mineral deposits and to investigate manganese crusts on off-axis seamounts. ROV surveys at the Jøtul hydrothermal field identified four areas of active venting, together with inactive hydrothermal mounds and pillow lavas. Rocks, sediments, biological material and hydrothermal fluids were sampled, and temperatures were measured at two active smokers. The expedition also mapped and sampled manganese crusts on the Hovgaard Ridge and an adjacent off-axis seamount. Farther south, ROV observations near 76.8°N identified three small hydrothermal fields containing inactive chimneys and areas of low-temperature venting. The final operations included the first ROV sampling of the East Greenland Ridge, an extinct transform fault.

=== 2023 expedition ===
The second GoNorth expedition took place from 7 July to 7 August 2023 aboard the Norwegian research icebreaker Kronprins Haakon, under the leadership of Professor Rolf Birger Pedersen from the University of Bergen. Its principal objective was to investigate the western Gakkel Ridge, particularly an unusually deep section where mantle rocks and indications of hydrothermal activity had previously been identified. The expedition was planned in cooperation with the German research icebreaker RV Polarstern, with additional objectives including oceanographic monitoring, sediment sampling and sea-ice research.

Heavy sea-ice conditions prevented both vessels from reaching their principal target areas, requiring changes to the research programme and the postponement of planned oceanographic mooring deployments. Nevertheless, investigations were conducted at the Aurora hydrothermal vent field and along Lucky Ridge in the Lena Trough. At Aurora, remotely operated vehicle (ROV) surveys identified two areas of active hydrothermal venting, including a previously unknown site with black smoker chimneys up to 10 m tall. Hydrothermal deposits, volcanic rocks and sediments were also sampled.

At Lucky Ridge, researchers combined ship-based bathymetric surveys with high-resolution mapping and sampling using the ROV Ægir 6000. The investigations identified extensive inactive hydrothermal deposits, exposed mantle-derived rocks and evidence of diffuse hydrothermal activity. The expedition also discovered the previously unknown Ultima Thule hydrothermal field at approximately 3,000 m water depth. The field contained active black smoker chimneys, extensive sulfide deposits and abundant hydrothermal vent fauna.

Sea-ice investigations were carried out at three ice stations, where four pressure ridges were surveyed using 53 drill holes. Measurements included ice thickness, freeboard, snow depth, temperature, salinity and density. Additional observations included shipborne optical and lidar measurements of sea-ice conditions. The expedition also conducted oceanographic measurements across Fram Strait and collected water and seabed sediment samples for physical, chemical and biological investigations. Subsequent research examined the geometry, structure and physical properties of sea-ice ridges during the transition from first-year to second-year ice.

=== 2024 expedition ===
The GoNorth 2024 expedition was planned to cover the area close to Svalbard, the northern coast of Greenland, and Ellesmere Island. The 2024 expedition included sampling in ice-covered Independence Fjord in northern Greenland, Fram Strait, and north of Svalbard. The sampling included four seismic surveys, gravimetry, four plankton net samplings, four heat flow measurements, 32 CTDs, and the collection of 154 sediment cores. One of the four seismic lines included a transform boundary between the North American and Eurasian continental plates.

=== 2025 expedition ===
The GoNorth 2025 was planned to take place from 27 November to 17 December, focusing on geological structures and marine ecosystems north and west of Svalbard. The main objective was to collect samples at the Ultima Thule hydrothermal vent, but it was not reached due to an issue with one of the ship’s main engines. The expedition completed three seismic survey lines and continuous bathymetric sampling across the East Greenland Ridge. Several dives were performed, including the collection of rock samples and sediments. The ROV dives were performed at East Greenland Ridge, Jøtul hydrothermal field, Molloy Deep, and Sophia Basin.

== Scientific results ==
The GoNorth programme has contributed to new insights into Arctic geology, oceanography, and sea ice processes, including the discovery of previously unknown hydrothermal activity. Additional results include improved mapping of Arctic seafloor structures and new data on sediment composition and sea ice properties.

During the second expedition of the GoNorth programme in 2023, researchers discovered the Ultima Thule vent field. The site features an active “black smoker” chimney rising to ten metres, situated on Lucky Ridge — a 1,600-metre-high subsea mountain. In 2025, a long-term underwater observatory was deployed at Ultima Thule by the Swedish icebreaker Oden during the Canada–Sweden Arctic Ocean 2025 expedition. The observatory comprises a lander and a mooring line equipped with three Conductivity-Temperature-Depth (CTD) sensors, nine temperature sensors, and a high-accuracy pressure sensor.

These findings contribute to a broader understanding of Arctic geodynamics, ocean circulation, and sea ice processes.

== Organisation and programme structure ==
GoNorth is a Norwegian research programme involving multiple academic and research institutions, including the UiT Arctic University of Norway and the University of Bergen.

The expeditions are conducted using the Norwegian icebreaking research vessel Kronprins Haakon, operated for polar research missions. The programme is carried out in collaboration with international partners.

The GoNorth 2022 budget was 15 million Norwegian kroner from the Research Council of Norway.

GoNorth is organized into multiple work packages (WPs), covering areas like seabed geology, ice and sea ice cover, oceanography, biology, technology, and climate history.

== See also ==
- Arctic exploration
- MOSAiC Expedition
- Surface Heat Budget of the Arctic Ocean (SHEBA) expedition
- Nansen's Fram expedition
- CONTRASTS Expedition
- Gakkel Ridge
