= Ove Stokstad =

Norwegian printmaker and jazz musician (1939–2018)

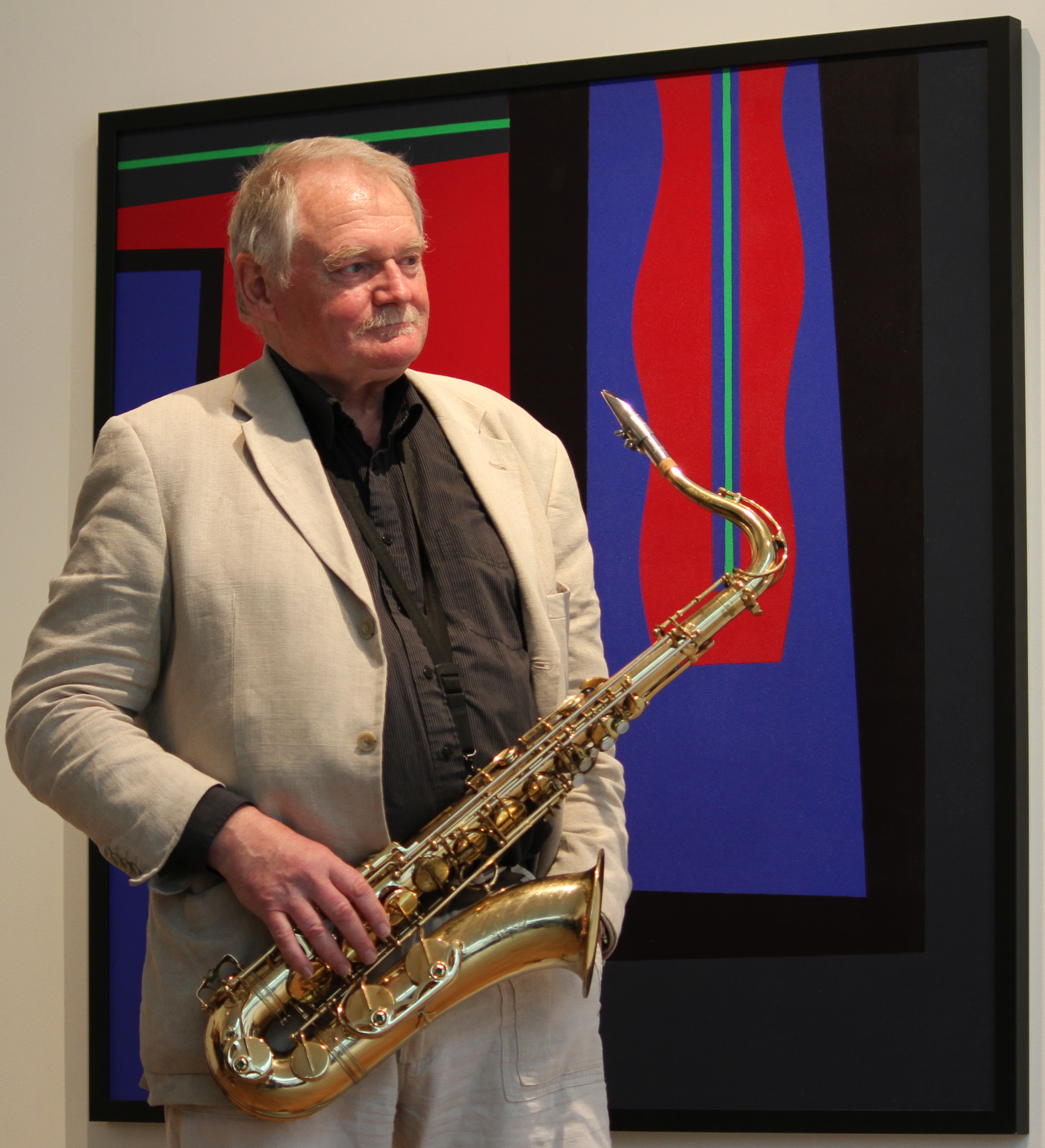
- Stokstad at Moldejazz in 2013
- Born: 9 August 1939; Trondheim, Norway
- Died: 5 February 2018 (aged 78); Trondheim
- Occupations: printmaker and jazz musician

Ove Stokstad (9 August 1939 – 5 February 2018) was a Norwegian printmaker and jazz musician.

== Life and career ==
He was born in Trondheim to Eva Prior Bergh and Rolf Colbjørnsen Stokstad, and was married to textile artist Gudrun Skeie Stokstad, who died in 2016.

He is represented with art works in a number of museums, including the National Gallery of Norway, and museums in Östersund, Reykjavík, Darmstadt, Couvin, Ottawa, Oregon, Boston and New York City. He was appointed professor at the Trondheim Academy of Fine Art from 1996 to 2002. As jazz musician Stokstad played clarinet and saxophones with jazz groups such as Bodega Band and Søyr, as well as leading his own ensembles. He also toured with Concerts Norway several times.

Ove Stokstad had a strong political commitment and was socially engaged; he believed that it was self-evident that when you create culture and address an audience, you should also engage with your surroundings. He created several figurative images with black motifs on white paper. Several of these images show his commitment to human rights, often with stories of abuse and oppression in both subject and title.
