= Jon Tolaas =

Norwegian teacher, poet and novelist

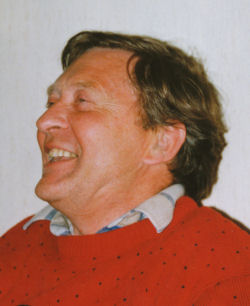
- Born: 3 June 1939; Vågsøy, Norway
- Died: 1 September 2012 (aged 73)
- Occupations: teacher, poet and novelist
- Awards: Sogn og Fjordane Cultural Prize

Jon Tolaas (3 June 1939–1 September 2012) was a Norwegian teacher, poet and novelist. He was born in Vågsøy. Among his poetry collections are Gjest i ditt tjeld from 1968 and Rapport frå reservatet from 1969. He published the novel Sju in 1971. His book Nattkino. Ei bok om draum from 1992 is based on a former newspaper column that he wrote for Bergens Tidende.

He was awarded the Sogn og Fjordane Cultural Prize in 1987.
