= Almaz Central Marine Design Bureau =

Company based in Saint Petersburg, Russia

Coordinates: 59°51′46″N 30°18′53″E

- Company type: Joint-stock company
- Founded: 1949
- Headquarters: Saint Petersburg, Russia
- Parent: United Shipbuilding Corporation
- Website: www.almaz-kb.ru

Almaz Central Marine Design Bureau (Russian: Центральное морское конструкторское бюро «Алмаз») is a company based in Saint Petersburg, Russia. It operates as part of the United Shipbuilding Corporation.

Almaz is renowned as a leading designer of high-speed combat ships and boats, specializing in dynamically supported craft such as hydrofoils, hovercraft, and surface-effect ships. The company has designed various notable vessels, including the Dergach missile air cushion vehicle, the Nanuchka and Tarantul-class missile corvettes, the Matka-class missile hydrofoil, the Pauk-class anti-submarine warfare vessel, and the Pomornik-class air cushion vehicle.
