= Caisson (engineering) =

Rigid structure to provide workers with a dry working environment below water level

Schematic cross section of a pressurized caisson

In geotechnical engineering, a caisson (/ˈkeɪsən, -sɒn/; borrowed from French caisson 'box', from Italian cassone 'large box', an augmentative of cassa) is a watertight retaining structure. It is used, for example, to work on the foundations of a bridge pier, for the construction of a concrete dam, or for the repair of ships.

Caissons are constructed in such a way that the water can be pumped out, keeping the work environment dry. When piers are being built using an open caisson, and it is not practical to reach suitable soil, friction pilings may be driven to form a suitable sub-foundation. These piles are connected by a foundation pad upon which the column pier is erected.

== History ==
The basic principles of caisson construction were already known in antiquity and were used by Roman and later medieval engineers for underwater foundations and harbor works.

Modern pneumatic caisson technology, however, was developed during the 19th century. Three prominent examples of caisson engineering are the Royal Albert Bridge (completed in 1859), the Eads Bridge (completed in 1874), and the Brooklyn Bridge (completed in 1883).

== Types ==
To install a caisson in place, it is brought down through soft mud until a suitable foundation material is encountered. While bedrock is preferred, a stable, hard mud is sometimes used when bedrock is too deep. The four main types of caisson are box caisson, open caisson, pneumatic caisson and monolithic caisson.

=== Box ===
A box caisson is a prefabricated box with sides and a bottom, open at the top. It is typically set down on a flat, prepared base. Once in place, it is filled with ballast to become part of the works, such as the foundation for a bridge pier. Hollow concrete structures are generally less dense than water so a box caisson must be secured to prevent it from moving offsite until it can be filled with ballast. Sometimes elaborate anchoring systems may be required, such as in tidal zones. Adjustable anchoring systems combined with a GPS survey enable engineers to position a box caisson with pinpoint accuracy.

=== Open ===
An open caisson is similar to a box caisson, except that it does not have a bottom face. It is suitable for use in soft clays (e.g. in some river-beds), but not for where there may be large obstructions in the ground. An open caisson that is used in soft grounds or high water tables, where open trench excavations are impractical, can also be used to install deep manholes, pump stations, and reception and launch pits for microtunnelling, pipe jacking and other operations.

A caisson is sunk by self-weight, concrete or water ballast placed on top, or by hydraulic jacks. The leading edge (or cutting shoe) of the caisson is sloped out at a sharp angle to aid sinking in a vertical manner; it is usually made of steel. The shoe is generally wider than the caisson to reduce friction, and the leading edge may be supplied with pressurised bentonite slurry, which swells in water, stabilizing settlement by filling depressions and voids. An open caisson may fill with water during sinking. The material is excavated by clamshell excavator bucket on crane.

The formation level subsoil may still not be suitable for excavation or bearing capacity. The water in the caisson (due to a high water table) balances the upthrust forces of the soft soils underneath. If dewatered, the base may "pipe" or "boil", causing the caisson to sink. To combat this problem, piles may be driven from the surface to act as:

- Load-bearing walls, in that they transmit loads to deeper soils.
- Anchors, in that they resist flotation because of the friction at the interface between their surfaces and the surrounding earth into which they have been driven.

H-beam sections (typical column sections, due to resistance to bending in all axis) may be driven at angles "raked" to rock or other firmer soils; the H-beams are left extended above the base. A reinforced concrete plug may be placed under the water, a process known as tremie concrete placement. When the caisson is dewatered, this plug acts as a pile cap, resisting the upward forces of the subsoil.

=== Monolithic ===
A monolithic caisson (or simply a monolith) is larger than the other types of caisson, but similar to open caissons. Such caissons are often found in quay walls, where resistance to impact from ships is required.

=== Pneumatic ===
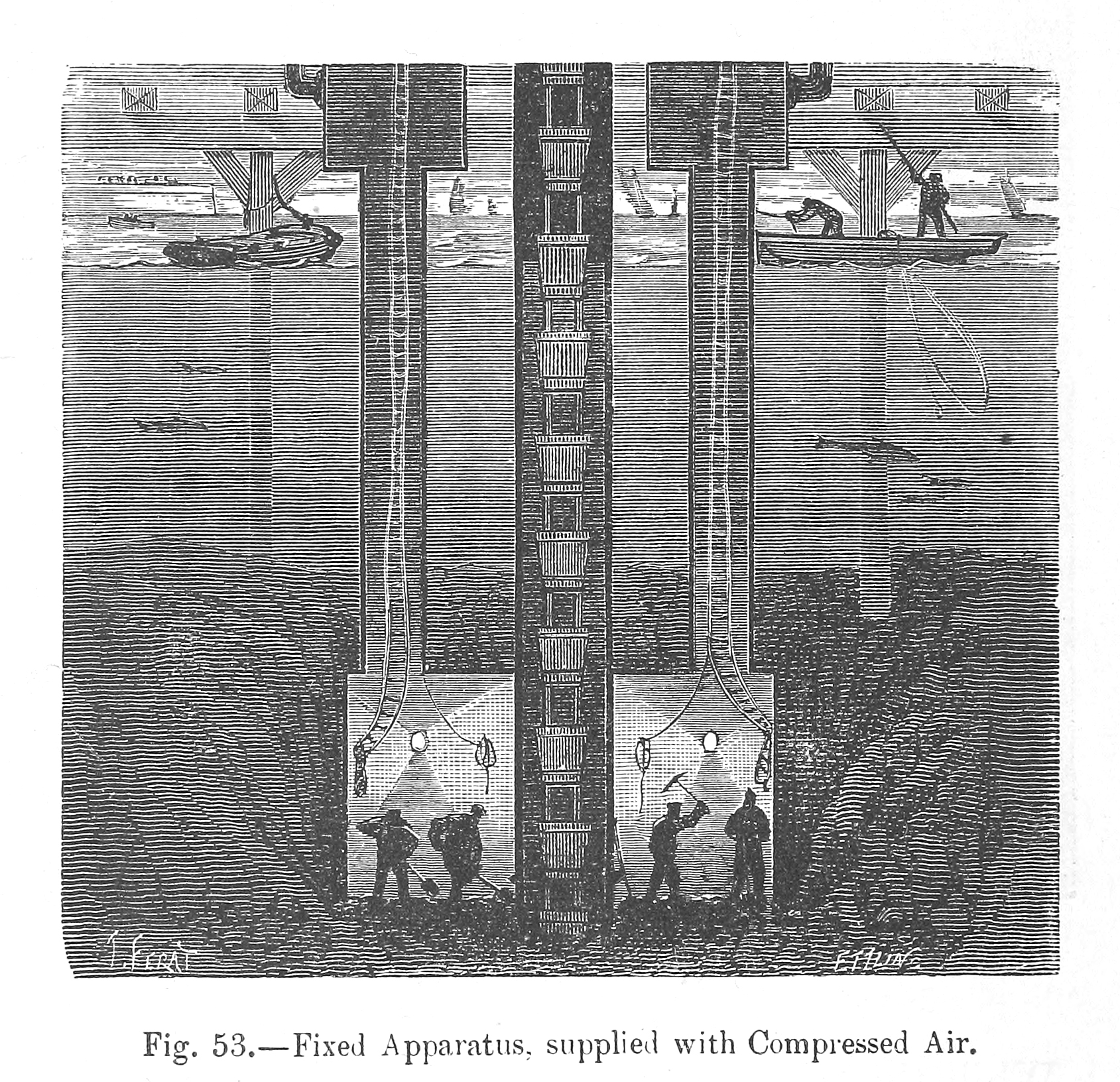
Pneumatic caisson, supplied with compressed air

Shallow caissons may be open to the air, whereas pneumatic caissons (sometimes called pressurized caissons), which penetrate soft mud, are bottomless boxes sealed at the top and filled with compressed air to keep water and mud out at depth. An airlock allows access to the chamber. Workers, called sandhogs in American English, move mud and rock debris (called muck) from the edge of the workspace to a water-filled pit, connected by a tube (called the muck tube) to the surface. A crane at the surface removes the soil with a clamshell bucket. The water pressure in the tube balances the air pressure, with excess air escaping up the muck tube. The pressurized air flow must be constant to ensure regular air changes for the workers and prevent excessive inflow of mud or water at the base of the caisson. When the caisson hits bedrock, the sandhogs exit through the airlock and fill the box with concrete, forming a solid foundation pier.

A pneumatic (compressed-air) caisson has the advantage of providing dry working conditions, which is better for placing concrete. It is also well suited for foundations for which other methods might cause settlement of adjacent structures.

Construction workers who leave the pressurized environment of the caisson must decompress at a rate that allows symptom-free release of inert gases dissolved in the body tissues if they are to avoid decompression sickness, a condition first identified in caisson workers, and originally named "caisson disease" in recognition of the occupational hazard. Construction of the Brooklyn Bridge, which was built with the help of pressurised caissons, resulted in numerous workers being either killed or permanently injured by caisson disease during its construction. Barotrauma of the ears, sinus cavities and lungs and dysbaric osteonecrosis are other risks.

== Other uses ==
- Caissons have also been used in the installation of hydraulic elevators where a single-stage ram is installed below the ground level.
- Caissons, codenamed Phoenix, were an integral part of the Mulberry harbours used during the World War II Allied invasion of Normandy.

== Other meanings ==
- Boat lift caissons: The word caisson is also used as a synonym for the moving trough part of caisson locks, canal lifts and inclines in which boats and ships rest while being lifted from one canal elevation to another; the water is retained on the inside of the caisson, or excluded from the caisson, according to the respective operating principle.
- Structural caissons: Caisson is also sometimes used as a colloquial term for a reinforced concrete structure formed by pouring into a hollow cylindrical form, typically by placing a caisson form below grade in an open excavation and pouring once backfill is complete, or by drilling at grade, although this can be problematic with deep caissons, as unsupported excavations can collapse before the caisson form can be inserted. In this manner, the earth placed around the empty caisson form provides stability and strength, allowing concrete to be poured with fewer complications and with less risk of a form blowout. While, technically, only the form itself is actually a caisson, it is not uncommon for any below-grade cast concrete pillar to be referred to as, simply, a caisson.
- Ventilation filtration systems: The word caisson is also used as a name for an airtight housing for ventilation filters in facilities that handle hazardous materials. The housing usually has an upstream compartment for a pre-filter element and a downstream compartment for a high-efficiency filter element. It may have multiple sets of compartments. The housing has gasketed access doors to allow for the change out of the filter elements. The housing is usually equipped with connection points used to test the efficiency of the filters and monitor changes in the differential pressure across the filter media.

== See also ==
- Suction caisson – Open bottomed tube anchor embedded and released by pressure differential
- Air lock diving-bell plant – Underwater work support barge used at Gibraltar, a mobile barge-mounted engineering caisson used in the Port of Gibraltar
- Cofferdam – Barrier allowing liquid to be pumped out of an enclosed area, a temporary water-excluding structure built in place, sometimes surrounding a working area as does an open caisson.
- Offshore geotechnical engineering – Sub-field of engineering concerned with human-made structures in the sea, for information on geotechnical considerations.

== Patents ==
- U.S. patent 123,002 – Improvement in construction of sub-aqueous foundations
