= Unique Group (UAE) =

UAE offshore services and subsea engineering company

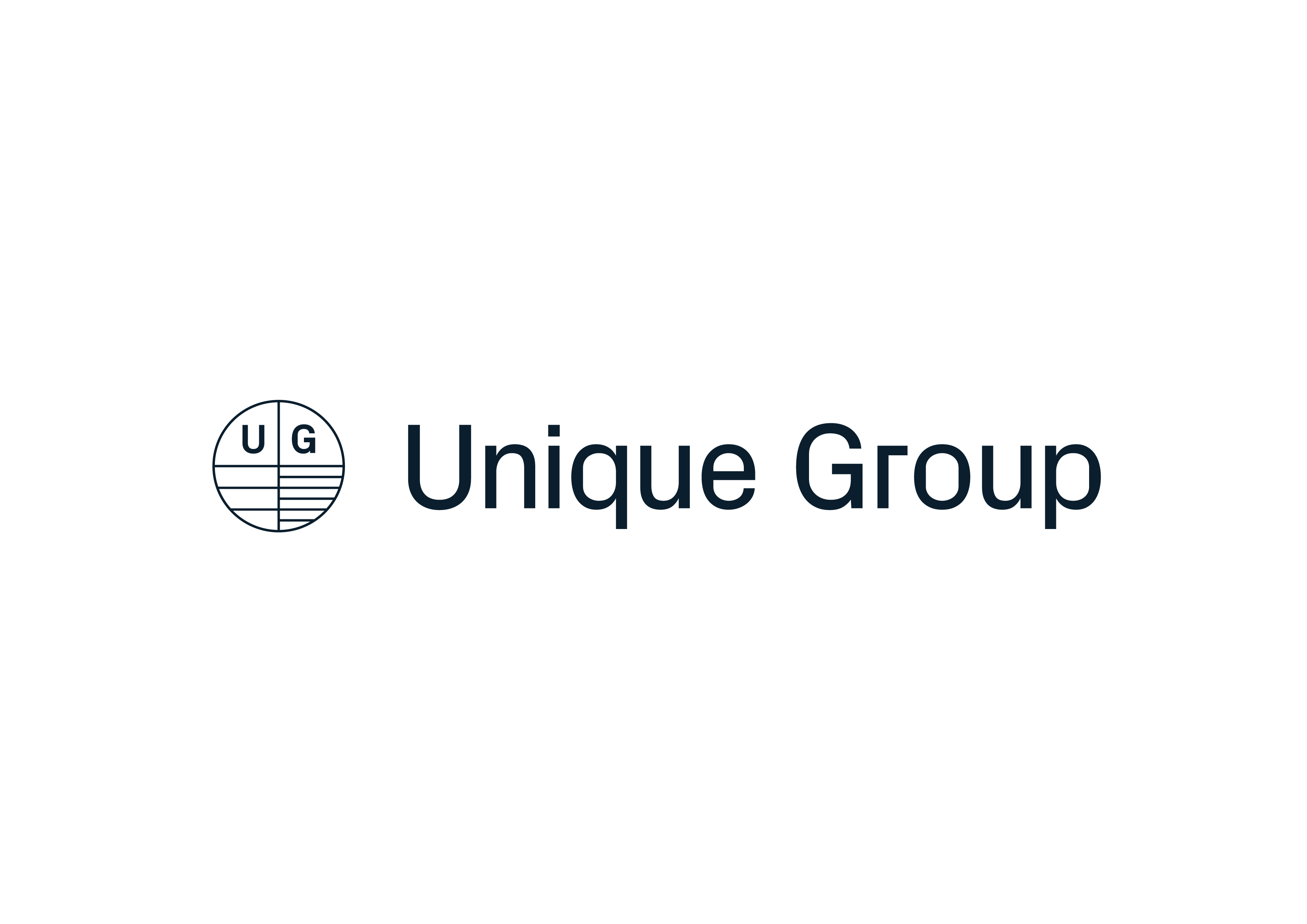
- Formerly: Unique Maritime
- Type: Private
- Industry: Offshore services, Subsea engineering
- Founded: 1993
- Founder: Himanshu Gandhi
- Headquarters: Sharjah, United Arab Emirates
- Area served: Worldwide
- Key people: Himanshu Gandhi (Chairman); Giovanni Corbetta (CEO)
- Services: Offshore engineering and subsea services
- Number of employees: 600+
- Website: www.uniquegroup.com

Unique Group (formerly Unique Maritime) is a UAE-based offshore services and subsea engineering company headquartered in Sharjah, United Arab Emirates. Founded in 1993 by Himanshu Gandhi, the company provides offshore engineering and subsea services for the offshore energy and marine industries.

== History ==
=== Founding and early years ===
Unique Maritime was founded in Sharjah in 1993 by Himanshu Gandhi.

In 2000, the company acquired Hydra Marine, establishing operations in South Africa.

=== International expansion ===
In 2009, the company expanded internationally with offices in Aberdeen and Mumbai.

In 2011, the company acquired Seaflex, a manufacturer of buoyancy and airlift bag systems. In 2012, Unique Group acquired Wellube, adding hot-tapping and line-stopping services.

Blue Water Energy invested in Unique Maritime in 2014. n 2015, the company acquired GSE Rentals and Oceanwide Safety at Sea and established operations in Singapore and the Netherlands.

=== Diversification and rebranding ===
In 2017, Unique Group introduced medical technology products, including hyperbaric oxygen therapy systems.

In 2018, the company acquired the load-testing equipment company Water Weights.

In 2020, Unique Group acquired the marine division of Western Advance in Australia. During the COVID-19 pandemic, the company also introduced a pressure ventilator system for healthcare use in Africa.

In 2022, the company changed its name from Unique Maritime to Unique Group.

In May 2023, Sahil Gandhi became chief executive officer, succeeding company founder Himanshu Gandhi, who became chairman. In July 2026, Giovanni Corbetta succeeded Gandhi as chief executive officer.

=== Recent developments ===
In 2023, Sahil Gandhi was appointed Chief Executive Officer, while Harry Gandhi assumed the role of Chairman.

In May 2024, Unique Group acquired the British subsea engineering company Subsea Innovation from Tekmar Group.

In 2025, the company was selected to provide technology for Vanguard, a subsea habitat developed by DEEP for ocean research.

In 2026, Unique Group opened an in-house calibration laboratory at its Aberdeen office.

== Operations ==
Unique Group provides equipment and engineering services for offshore energy and marine operations. Its operations include offshore surveying, diving systems, unmanned surface vehicles and subsea decommissioning services. The company also develops unmanned surface vehicles for hydrographic and offshore surveying. Its Uni-Cat vessel, introduced in 2019, was later renamed Uni-Max.

The company also develops and manufactures equipment for offshore and subsea operations, including excavation, hydrographic surveying and underwater inspection. Engineering and consulting services are provided through its subsidiary, Subsea Innovation. The company operates manufacturing facilities in the United Arab Emirates, the United Kingdom, and South Africa.

== Research and development ==
Unique Group develops technologies for offshore and subsea operations. Its research has focused on unmanned systems, commercial diving equipment and survey technologies. The company manufactures subsea excavation equipment. In 2025, the company introduced two additional unmanned surface vehicle models.

== See also ==
- Offshore engineering
- Subsea technology
- Unmanned surface vehicle
