= Plus–minus =

Plus–minus, ±, +/−, or variants may refer to:

- Plus–minus sign (±), a mathematical symbol which can mean either plus (+) or minus (−), or can indicate the uncertainty of a measurement or statistic
- Plus–minus (sports), a sports statistic used to measure a player's impact on the game
- Plus–minus method, a geophysical method to interpret seismic refraction profiles

== Music ==
- Plus-Minus (Stockhausen), a 1963 composition by Karlheinz Stockhausen
- +/- (band), an American indietronic band formed 2001
- +/− (Buke and Gase EP) (2008)
- +- Singles 1978-80, a 2010 Joy Division compilation album
- + − (album), a 2015 album by Mew
- +/- (album), a 2021 album by Boys Noize
- "+-", a song by M.I Abaga from A Study on Self Worth: Yxng Dxnzl

== See also ==
- Plus and minus signs, mathematical symbols
- Radical 33, a Chinese radical with the symbol "士"
  - 士 (disambiguation), other uses of the symbol "士"
