= 士 (disambiguation) =

士 is Kangxi radical 33.

士 may also refer to:

- 士 shi, "yeoman", see Chinese nobility
- 武士 bushi "warrior", see Samurai

== See also ==
- Plus–minus (disambiguation), for uses of the "±" sign
