= Metocean =

Study of weather and the ocean

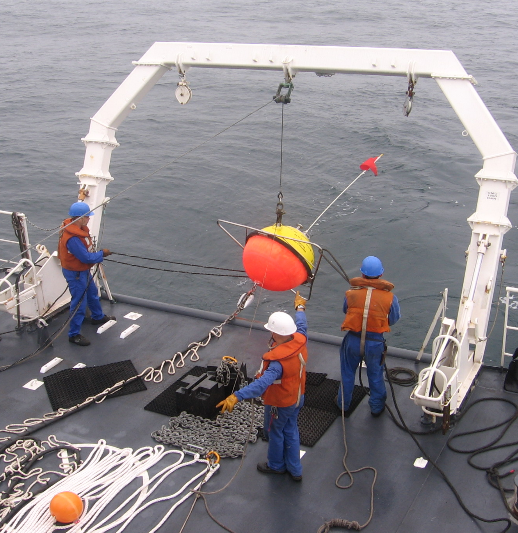
Deployment of a Datawell waverider buoy near the southwestern coast of France, for the measurement of ocean wave statistics, like the significant wave height and period, wave direction and power spectrum.

In offshore and coastal engineering, metocean refers to the syllabic abbreviation of meteorology and (physical) oceanography.

== Metocean study ==
In various stages of an offshore or coastal engineering project a metocean study will be undertaken. This, in order to estimate the environmental conditions of direct influence on the choices to be made during the project phase at hand, and to arrive at an effective and efficient solution for the problems/goals stated. In later phases of a project, more detailed and thorough metocean studies may be needed, depending on whether there is an expected additional gain with respect to the successful and efficient completion of the project.

== Metocean conditions ==
Metocean conditions refer to the combined wind, wave and climate (etc.) conditions as found on a certain location. They are most often presented as statistics, including seasonal variations, scatter tables, wind roses and probability of exceedance. The metocean conditions may include, depending on the project and its location, statistics on:

Meteorology

- wind speed, direction, gustiness, wind rose and wind spectrum
- air temperature
- humidity
- occurrence and strength of typhoons, hurricanes and (other) cyclones

Classification of wave phenomena – of the sea and ocean surface – according to wave period, by Walter Munk.

Physical oceanography

- water level fluctuations
  - historical, expected and seasonal sea level changes
  - storm surges
  - tides
  - tsunamis
  - seiches
  - wind waves – wind seas and swells – characterised by statistics like: significant wave heights and periods, propagation directions and (directional) spectra
- bathymetry
- salinity, temperature and other constituents
- stratification, density-driven currents and internal waves
- ice occurrence, extent, thickness, strength and seabed gouging

== Metocean data ==
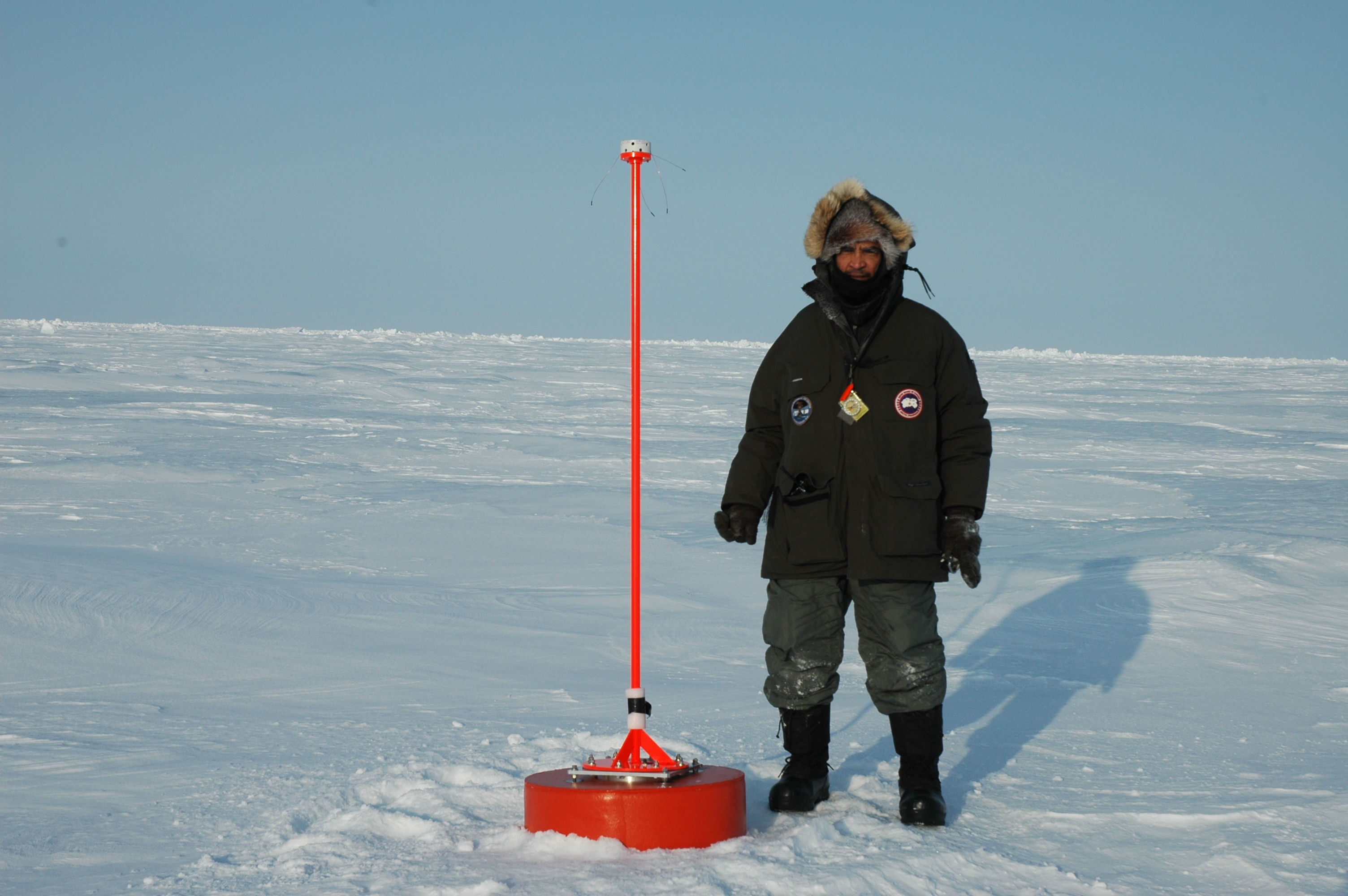
Ice beacon – for tracking the movement of the ice by GPS, as well as containing other sensors for measuring more metocean parameters – and Pablo Clemente-Colón of the U.S. National Ice Center.

The metocean conditions are preferably based on metocean data, which can come from measuring instruments deployed in or near the project area, global (re-analysis) models and remote sensing (often by satellites). For estimating probabilities of exceedance – for relevant physical quantities – data of extreme events during more than one year is needed.

By use of validated numerical models, the availability of metocean data can be extended. For instance, consider the case of a coastal location where no wave measurements are available. If there is long-term wave data available in a nearby offshore location (e.g. from satellites), a wind wave model can be employed to transform the offshore wave statistics to the nearshore location (provided the bathymetry is known).

Often, long-term local measurements of wave conditions due to extreme events (e.g. hurricanes) are missing. By using estimates for the wind fields during past extreme events, the corresponding wave conditions can be computed through wave hindcasts.
