= European Offshore Wind Deployment Centre =

Offshore wind innovation hub in Scotland

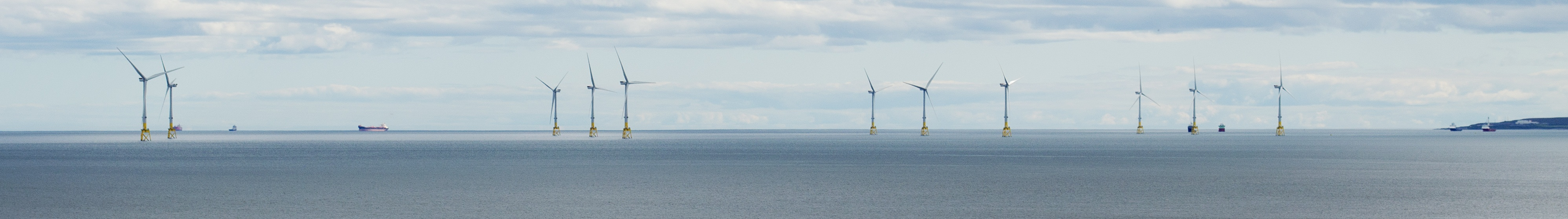
- Country: Scotland
- Location: Aberdeen's Bay
- Coordinates: 57°13′N 1°59′W
- Status: Operational
- Commission date: September 2018
- Construction cost: £335 million
- Owner: European Offshore Wind Deployment Centre

Wind farm
- Type: Offshore
- Max. water depth: 32 m
- Distance from shore: 3 km (2 mi)
- Hub height: 120 m
- Rotor diameter: 164 m
- Site area: 19 km^{2}

Power generation
- Units operational: 2 × 8.8 MW; 9 × 8.4 MW
- Make and model: Vestas V164 8.4-8.8MW
- Units planned: 11 × 8.5 MW
- Nameplate capacity: 92.4 MW

External links
- Website: www.vattenfall.co.uk/our-projects/european-offshore-wind-deployment-centre
- Commons: Related media on Commons

Wind farm layout

The European Offshore Wind Deployment Centre (EOWDC), also known as the Aberdeen Bay Wind Farm is an offshore wind test and demonstration facility located around 3 kilometres off the east coast of Aberdeenshire, in the North Sea, Scotland. It was developed by the European Offshore Wind Deployment Centre consortium. The scheme is relatively small - it consists of 11 wind turbines with an installed capacity of 93.2 megawatts. It is located between Blackdog and Bridge of Don near Aberdeen. First power was generated in July 2018, with full commissioning following in September 2018.

== Planning ==
The wind farm was initially proposed by the Aberdeen Renewable Energy Group (AREG) in 2003. The original plan was for 20 two-megawatt turbines in an eight kilometres long row about 1 kilometre offshore. A geological survey of Aberdeen Bay was begun in 2007, and a grant of 40 million euros was offered by the European Commission in 2009. The proposal at that stage was for a maximum of 23 turbines.

A planning application was lodged in August 2011. The application was submitted by Aberdeen Renewable Energy Group (AREG) in cooperation with two other companies, Vattenfall and Technip. The proposal was for 11 turbines. Planning consent was granted by the Scottish government in March 2013.

In May 2013 Vattenfall announced plans to reduce its stake in the project. In October 2013 Aberdeenshire councillors rejected a planning application to build an electricity substation. In December 2013 it was announced that construction would be delayed for two years, with connection of the grid occurring in 2017. In January 2014 an appeal against the substation vote was lodged. The developers won the appeal in July 2014.

Vattenfall decided to proceed with the 92 MW wind farm in July 2016. The plan was for 11 turbines each of 8 MW placed 3 km from land, with a contract for the assembly of suction bucket foundations for the turbines contracted out to Smulders Projects UK.

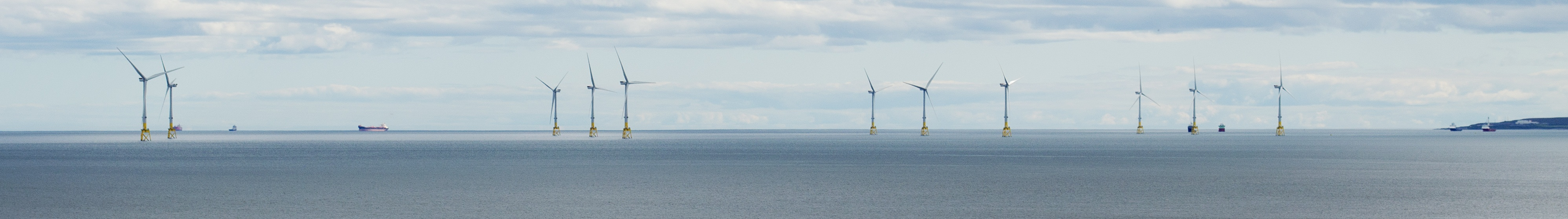
All eleven turbines of the European Offshore Wind Deployment Centre

== Objections ==
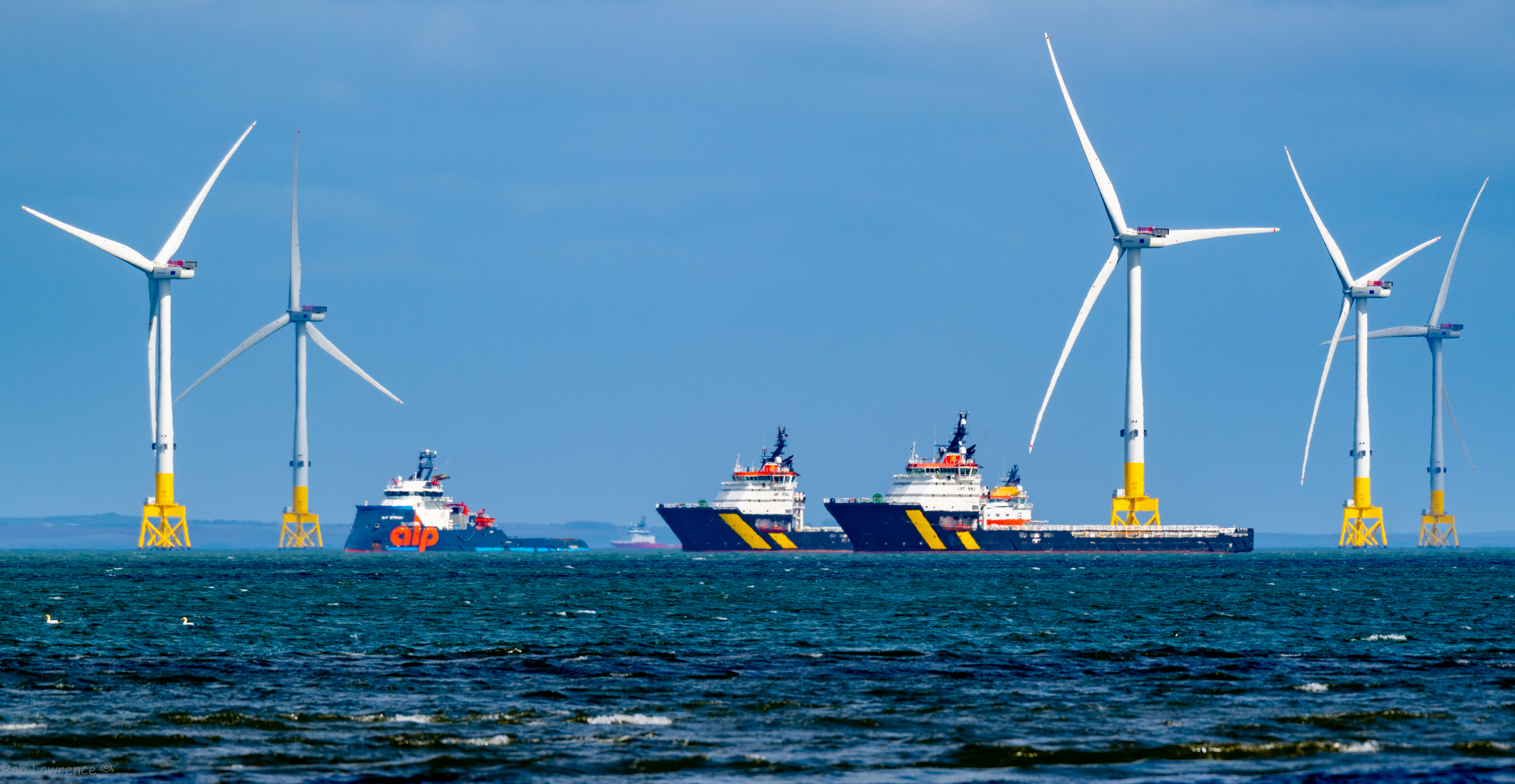
EOWDC turbines seen from closer distance

American billionaire Donald Trump purchased a large part of the Menie estate near the village of Balmedie in 2006. He proposed to build a golf course, with a hotel, holiday homes and a residential village. He expressed his concerns about the wind farm in April 2006 stating that "I want to see the ocean, I do not want to see windmills."

In 2006 RSPB Scotland expressed concern about the effect both the wind farm and Donald Trump's golf course would have on the wildlife on the Aberdeenshire coast. In 2011 the RSPB called for "more planning, research and monitoring ... to ensure we truly understand the impact this site may have on local birds."

In September 2011 the Trump Organization filed an objection to the planning application.

By 2012 the RSPB dropped its opposition to the wind farm following the reduction in the number of turbines and a change in the layout."

In May 2013 Trump launched a legal challenge against the Scottish government's decision to grant planning permission for the wind farm. The hearing began at the Court of Session in November 2013, but was rejected in February 2014. An appeal against the decision was heard at the Court of Session in January 2015, but Trump lost the appeal in June 2015. After the decision Trump said he would appeal before both the Supreme Court of the UK and the European Courts. Trump's appeal was unanimously dismissed by the UK Supreme Court in December 2015.

== Construction ==
The wind farm under construction in 2018, as seen from Bridge of Don

Connection work began in early 2017. The turbines are mounted on unusual suction bucket foundations. The sea cables are 66kV. There are more than four miles of high voltage underground cable between the substation in Dyce (on the outskirts of Aberdeen) and the wind farm's onshore substation at Blackdog. The first foundation was installed offshore in March 2018, and the first turbine was installed in April. The eleventh and final turbine was erected near the end of May. First power was generated in July 2018, with full commissioning following in September 2018.

== See also ==
- List of offshore wind farms in the United Kingdom
- List of tallest structures in the United Kingdom
