= Offshore geotechnical engineering =

Sub-field of engineering concerned with human-made structures in the sea

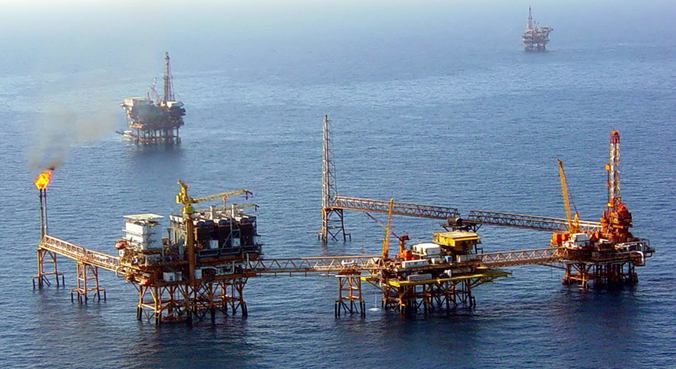
Platforms offshore Mexico.

Offshore geotechnical engineering is a sub-field of geotechnical engineering. It is concerned with foundation design, construction, maintenance and decommissioning for human-made structures in the sea. Oil platforms, artificial islands and submarine pipelines are examples of such structures. The seabed has to be able to withstand the weight of these structures and the applied loads. Geohazards must also be taken into account. The need for offshore developments stems from a gradual depletion of hydrocarbon reserves onshore or near the coastlines, as new fields are being developed at greater distances offshore and in deeper water, with a corresponding adaptation of the offshore site investigations. Today, there are more than 7,000 offshore platforms operating at a water depth up to and exceeding 2000 m. A typical field development extends over tens of square kilometers, and may comprise several fixed structures, infield flowlines with an export pipeline either to the shoreline or connected to a regional trunkline.

== Differences between onshore and offshore geotechnical engineering ==
An offshore environment has several implications for geotechnical engineering. These include the following:

- Ground improvement (on the seabed) and site investigation are expensive.
- Soil conditions are unusual (e.g. presence of carbonates, shallow gas).
- Offshore structures are tall, often extending over 100 metres (330 ft) above their foundation.
- Offshore structures typically have to contend with significant lateral loads (i.e. large moment loading relative to the weight of the structure).
- Cyclic loading can be a major design issue.
- Offshore structures are exposed to a wider range of geohazards.
- The codes and technical standards are different from those used for onshore developments.
- Design focuses on ultimate limit state as opposed to deformation.
- Design modifications during construction are either unfeasible or very expensive.
- The design life of these structures often ranges between 25–50 years.
- The environmental and financial costs in case of failure can be higher.

== The offshore environment ==
Offshore structures are exposed to various environmental loads: wind, waves, currents and, in cold oceans, sea ice and icebergs. Environmental loads act primarily in the horizontal direction, but also have a vertical component. Some of these loads get transmitted to the foundation (the seabed). Wind, wave and current regimes can be estimated from meteorological and oceanographic data, which are collectively referred to as metocean data. Earthquake-induced loading can also occur – they proceed in the opposite direction: from the foundation to the structure. Depending on location, other geohazards may also be an issue. All of these phenomena may affect the integrity or the serviceability of the structure and its foundation during its operational lifespan – they need to be taken into account in offshore design.

=== The nature of the soil ===
Following are some to the features characterizing the soil in an offshore environment:

- The soil is made up of sediments, which are generally assumed to be in a saturated state – saline water fills in the pore space.
- Marine sediments are composed of detrital material as well as remains of marine organisms, the latter making up calcareous soils.
- Total sediment thickness varies on a regional scale – it is normally higher near the coastline than it is away from it, where it is also finer grained.
- In places, the seabed can be devoid of sediment, due to strong bottom currents.
- The consolidation state of the soil is either normally consolidated (due to slow sediment deposition), overconsolidated (in places, a relic of glaciation) or underconsolidated (due to high sediment input).

=== Metocean aspects ===
Wave action against an offshore structure.

Wave forces induce motion of floating structures in all six degrees of freedom – they are a major design criterion for offshore structures. (Note: For instance, a given structure may undergo 2 × 10^{8} wave cycles during its design service life.) When a wave's orbital motion reaches the seabed, it induces sediment transport. This only occurs to a water depth of about 200 metres (660 ft), which is the commonly adopted boundary between shallow water and deep water. The reason is that the orbital motion only extends to a water depth that is half the wavelength, and the maximum possible wavelength is generally considered to be 400 metres (1,300 ft). In shallow water, waves may generate pore pressure build-up in the soil, which may lead to flow slide, and repeated impact on a platform may cause liquefaction, and loss of support.

Currents are a source of horizontal loading for offshore structures. Because of the Bernoulli effect, they may also exert upward or downward forces on structural surfaces and can induce the vibration of wire lines and pipelines. Currents are responsible for eddies around a structure, which cause scouring and erosion of the soil. There are various types of currents: oceanic circulation, geostrophic, tidal, wind-driven, and density currents.

=== Geohazards ===
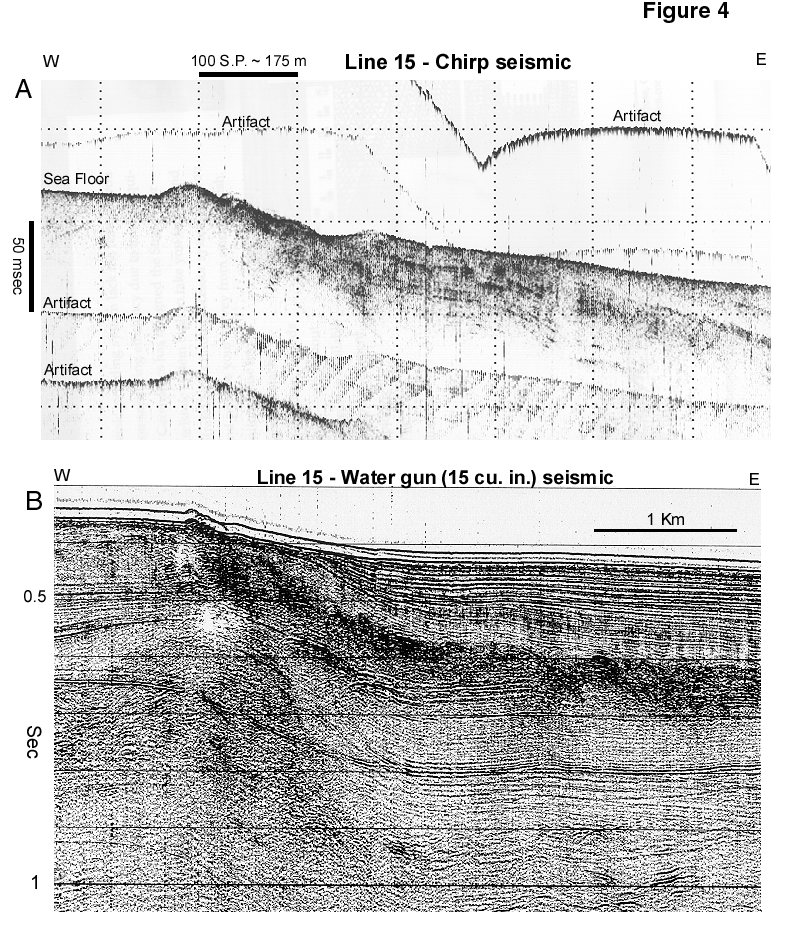
Two types of seismic profiles (top: chirp; bottom: Water gun) of a fault within the seabed in the Gulf of Mexico.

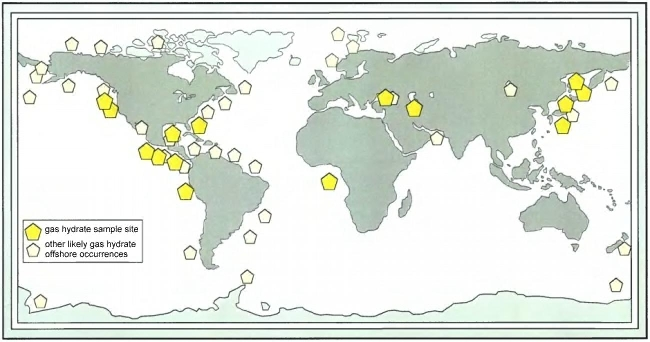
Worldwide distribution of gas hydrates, which are another potential hazard for offshore developments.

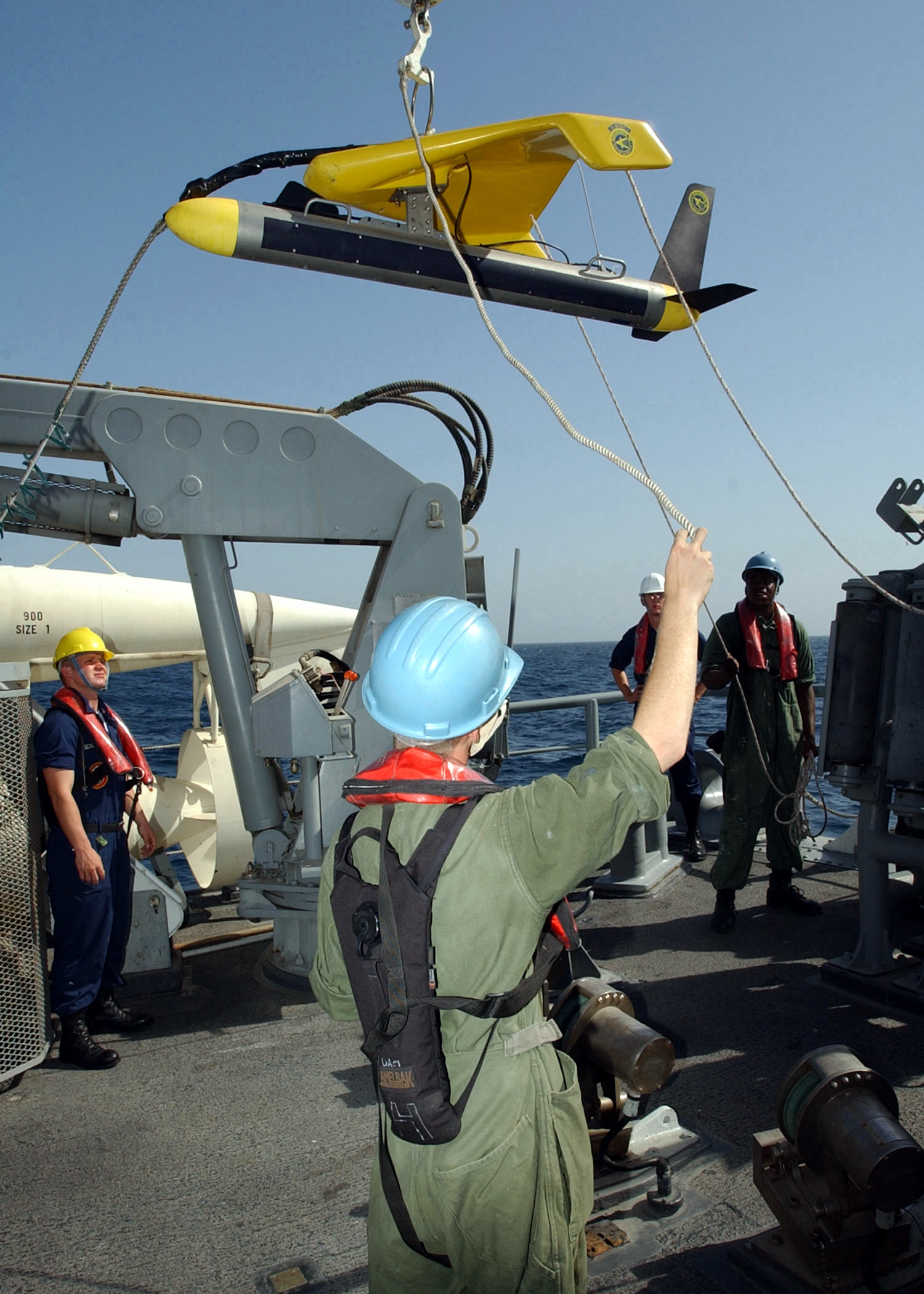
An example of a side scan sonar, a device used to survey the seabed.

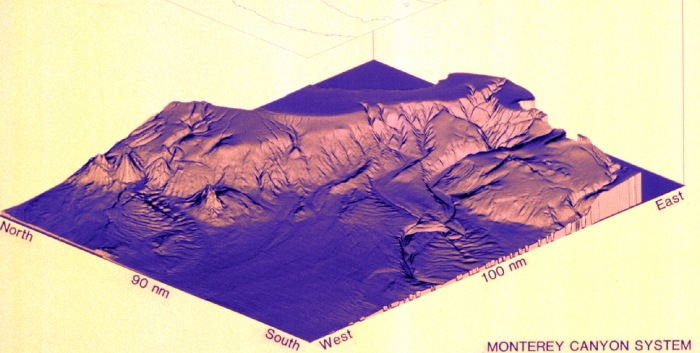
A 3D image of the Monterey Canyon system, an example of what can be obtained from multibeam echosounders.

Geohazards are associated with geological activity, geotechnical features and environmental conditions. Shallow geohazards are those occurring at less than 400 metres (1,300 ft) below the seafloor. Information on the potential risks associated with these phenomena is acquired through studies of the geomorphology, geological setting and tectonic framework in the area of interest, as well as with geophysical and geotechnical surveys of the seafloor. Examples of potential threats include tsunamis, landslides, active faults, mud diapirs and the nature of the soil layering (presence of karst, gas hydrates, carbonates). In cold regions, gouging ice features are a threat to subsea installations, such as pipelines. The risks associated with a particular type of geohazard is a function of how exposed the structure is to the event, how severe this event is and how often it occurs (for episodic events). Any threat has to be monitored, and mitigated for or removed.

== Site investigation ==
Offshore site investigations are not unlike those conducted onshore (see Geotechnical investigation). They may be divided into three phases:

- A desk study, which includes data compilation.
- Geophysical surveys, either shallow and deep seabed penetration.
- Geotechnical surveys, which includes sampling/drilling and in situ testing.

=== Desk study ===
In this phase, which may take place over a period of several months (depending on project size), information is gathered from various sources, including reports, scientific literature (journal articles, conference proceedings) and databases, with the purpose of evaluating risks, assessing design options and planning the subsequent phases. Bathymetry, regional geology, potential geohazards, seabed obstacles and metocean data are some of the information that are sought after during that phase.

=== Geophysical surveys ===
Geophysical surveys can be used for various purposes. One is to study the bathymetry in the location of interest and to produce an image of the seafloor (irregularities, objects on the seabed, lateral variability, ice gouges, ...). Seismic refraction surveys can be done to obtain information on shallow seabed stratigraphy – it can also be used to locate material such as sand, sand deposit and gravel for use in the construction of artificial islands. Geophysical surveys are conducted from a research vessel equipped with sonar devices and related equipment, such as single-beam and multibeam echosounders, side-scan sonars, ‘towfish’ and remotely operated vehicles (ROVs). For the sub-bottom stratigraphy, the tools used include boomers, sparkers, pingers and chirp. Geophysical surveys are normally required before conducting the geotechnical surveys; in larger projects, these phases may be interwoven.

=== Geotechnical surveys ===
Geotechnical surveys involve a combination of sampling, drilling, in situ testing as well as laboratory soil testing that is conducted offshore and, with samples, onshore. They serve to ground truth the results of the geophysical investigations; they also provide a detailed account of the seabed stratigraphy and soil engineering properties. Depending on water depth and metocean conditions, geotechnical surveys may be conducted from a dedicated geotechnical drillship, a semi-submersible, a jackup rig, a large hovercraft or other means. They are done at a series of specific locations, while the vessel maintains a constant position. Dynamic positioning and mooring with four-point anchoring systems are used for that purpose.

Shallow penetration geotechnical surveys may include soil sampling of the seabed surface or in situ mechanical testing. They are used to generate information on the physical and mechanical properties of the seabed. They extend to the first few meters below the mudline. Surveys done to these depths, which may be conducted at the same time as the shallow geophysical survey, may suffice if the structure to be deployed at that location is relatively light. These surveys are also useful for planning subsea pipeline routes.

The purpose of deep penetration geotechnical surveys is to collect information on the seabed stratigraphy to depths extending up to a few 100 meters below the mudline. These surveys are done when larger structures are planned at these locations. Deep drill holes require a few days during which the drilling unit has to remain exactly in the same position (see dynamic positioning).

==== Sampling and drilling ====
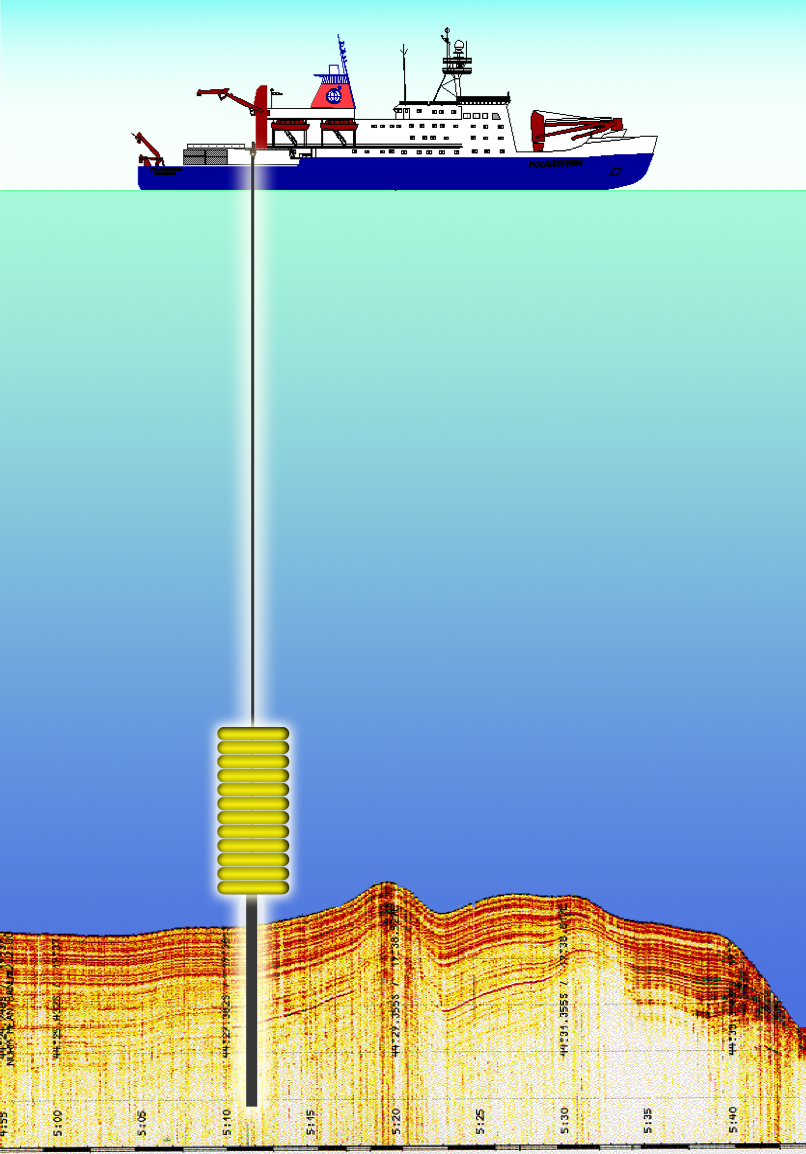
A gravity-driven soil sampler, used for coring the seabed.

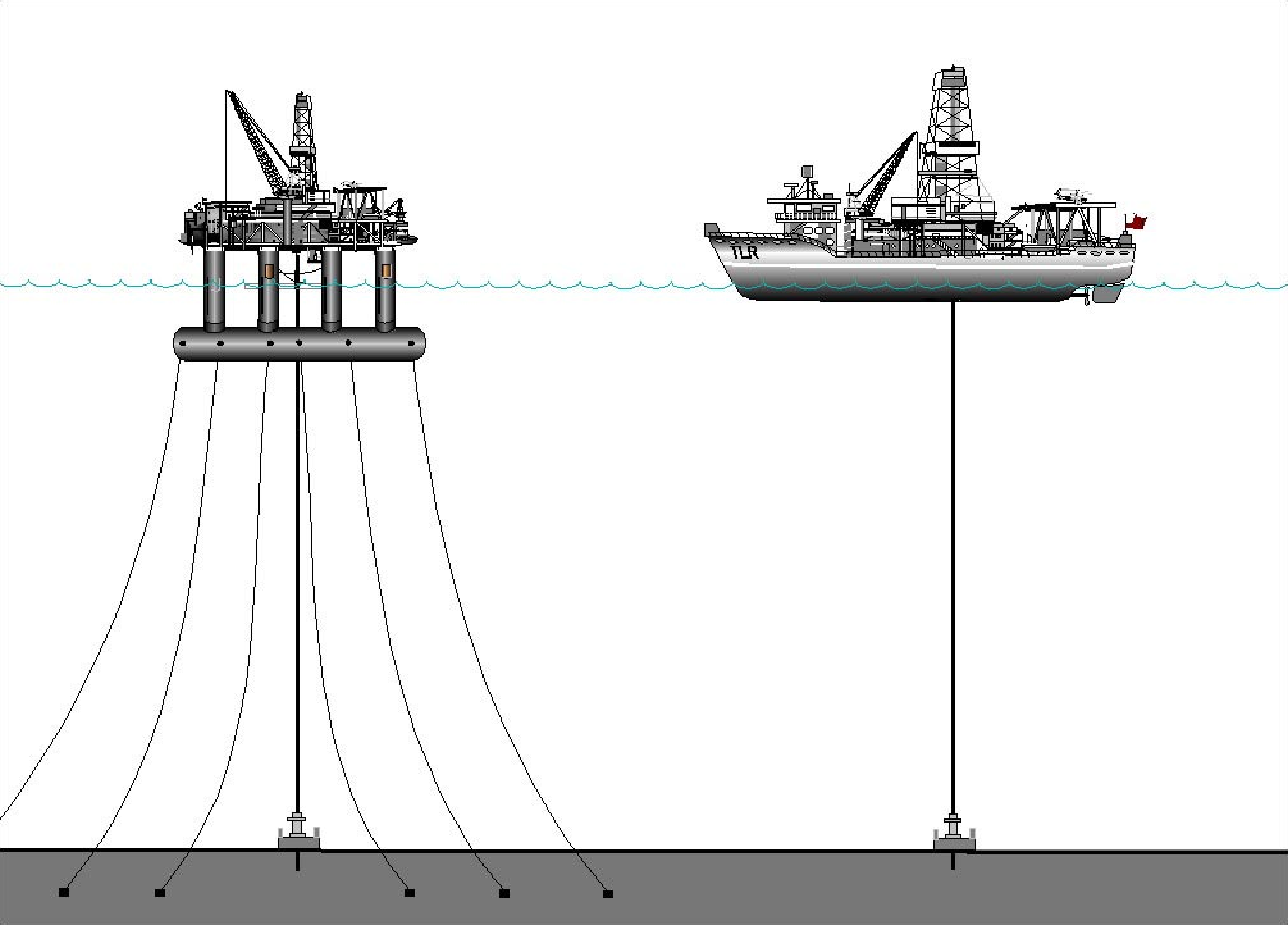
A gravity-driven soil sampler, used for coring the seabed.

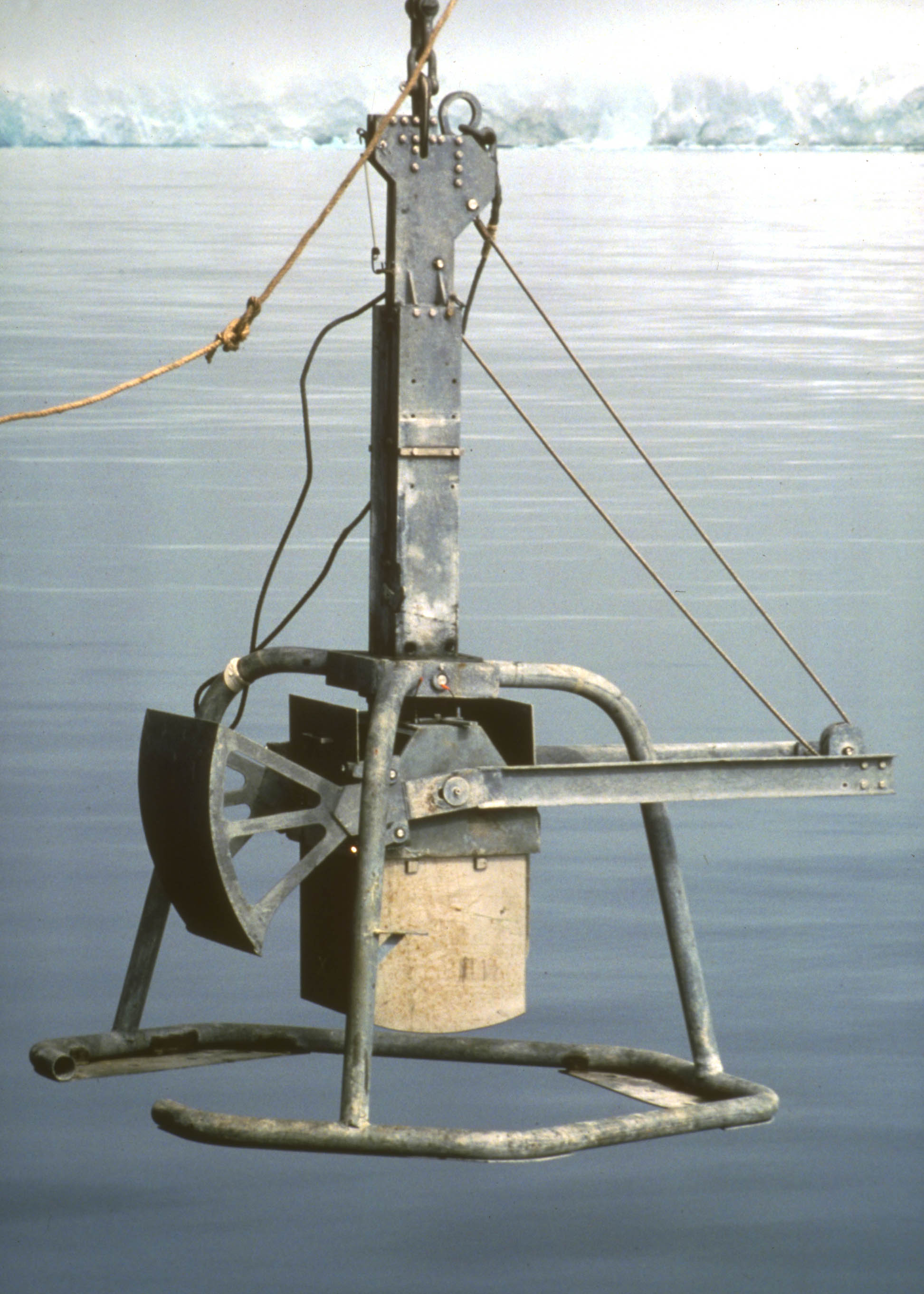
Box corer for extracting soil samples from the seabed.

Seabed surface sampling can be done with a grab sampler and with a box corer. The latter provides undisturbed specimens, on which testing can be conducted, for instance, to determine the soil's relative density, water content and mechanical properties. Sampling can also be achieved with a tube corer, either gravity-driven, or that can be pushed into the seabed by a piston or by means of a vibration system (a device called a vibrocorer).

Drilling is another means of sampling the seabed. It is used to obtain a record of the seabed stratigraphy or the rock formations below it. The set-up used to sample an offshore structure's foundation is similar to that used by the oil industry to reach and delineate hydrocarbon reservoirs, with some differences in the types of testing. The drill string consists of a series of pipe segments 5 inches (13 cm) in diameter screwed end to end, with a drillbit assembly at the bottom. As the dragbit (teeth extending downward from the drillbit) cut into the soil, soil cuttings are produced. Viscous drilling mud flowing down the drillpipe collects these cuttings and carry them up outside the drillpipe. As is the case for onshore geotechnical surveys, different tools can be used for sampling the soil from a drill hole, notably "Shelby tubes", "piston samplers" and "split spoon samplers".

==== In situ soil testing ====
Diagram showing the principle of a cone penetrometer to obtain the soil's strength profile.

Diagram showing the principle of a shear vane to measure the soil's peak strength and residual strength.

Information on the mechanical strength of the soil can be obtained in situ (from the seabed itself as opposed to in a laboratory from a soil sample). The advantage of this approach is that the data are obtained from soil that has not suffered any disturbance as a result of its relocation. Two of the most commonly used instruments used for that purpose are the cone penetrometer (CPT) and the shear vane.

The CPT is a rod-shaped tool whose end has the shape of a cone with a known apex angle (e.g. 60 degrees). As it is pushed into the soil, the resistance to penetration is measured, thereby providing an indication of soil strength. A sleeve behind the cone allows the independent determination of the frictional resistance. Some cones are also able to measure pore water pressure. The shear vane test is used to determine the undrained shear strength of soft to medium cohesive soils. This instrument usually consists of four plates welded at 90 degrees from each other at the end of a rod. The rod is then inserted into the soil and a torque is applied to it so as to achieve a constant rotation rate. The torque resistance is measured and an equation is then used to determine the undrained shear strength (and the residual strength), which takes into account the vane's size and geometry.

== Offshore structures and geotechnical considerations ==
Offshore structures are mainly represented by platforms, notably jackup rigs, steel jacket structures and gravity-based structures. The nature of the seabed has to be taken into account when planning these developments. For instance, a gravity-based structure typically has a very large footprint and is relatively buoyant (because it encloses a large open volume). Under these circumstances, vertical loading of the foundation may not be as significant as the horizontal loads exerted by wave actions and transferred to the seabed. In that scenario, sliding could be the dominant mode of failure. A more specific example is that of the Woodside "North Rankin A" steel jacket structure offshore Australia. The shaft capacity for the piles making up each of the structure's legs was estimated on the basis of conventional design methods, notably when driven into siliceous sands. But the soil at that site was a lower capacity calcareous sand. Costly remediation measures were required to correct this oversight.

Proper seabed characterization is also required for mooring systems. For instance, the design and installation of suction piles has to take into account the soil properties, notably its undrained shear strength. The same is true for the installation and capacity assessment of plate anchors.

=== Submarine pipelines ===
Submarine pipelines are another common type of man-made structure in the offshore environment. These structures either rest on the seabed, or are placed inside a trench to protect them from fishing trawlers, dragging anchors or fatigue due current-induced oscillations. Trenching is also used to protect pipelines from gouging by ice keels. In both cases, planning of the pipeline involves geotechnical considerations. Pipelines resting on the seabed require geotechnical data along the proposed pipeline route to evaluate potential stability issues, such as passive failure of the soil below it (the pipeline drops) due to insufficient bearing capacity, or sliding failure (the pipeline shift sideways), due to low sliding resistance. The process of trenching, when required, needs to take into account soil properties and how they would affect ploughing duration. Buckling potential induced by the axial and transverse response of the buried pipeline during its operational lifespan need to be assessed at the planning phase, and this will depend on the resistance of the enclosing soil.

=== Offshore embedded anchors ===
Offshore embedded anchors are anchors that derive their capacity from the frictional and/or bearing resistance of the soil surrounding them. This is converse to gravity anchors that derive their capacity from their weight. As offshore developments move into deeper waters, gravity based structures become less economical due to the large required size and cost of transportation. This proves opportune for the employment of embedded anchors.

== See also ==
- Civil engineering
- Earth materials
- Floating wind turbine
- Geohazard
- Geotechnical engineering
- Geotechnical investigation
- Geotechnics
- Ocean
- Offshore construction
- Offshore drilling
- Offshore (hydrocarbons)
- Oil platform
- Seabed
- Seabed gouging by ice
- Sediment
- Soil
- Soil mechanics
- Submarine pipeline
- Subsea

== Bibliography ==
- Bai Y. and Bai Q. (2010) Subsea Engineering Handbook. Gulf Professional Publishing, New York, 919 pp.
- Barrette, P (2011). "Offshore pipeline protection against seabed gouging by ice: An overview". Cold Regions Science and Technology. 69 (1): 3–20. Bibcode:2011CRST...69....3B. doi:10.1016/j.coldregions.2011.06.007.
- Bransby M.F., Yun G.J. Morrow D.R. and Brunning P. (2005) The performance of pipeline ploughs in layered soils. In: S.C.M. Gourvenec (Editor), Frontiers in Offshore Geotechnics, Taylor & Francis, Perth, Australia, pp. 597–605.
- Cardenas, I.C.; et al. (2023). "Marine geohazards exposed: Uncertainties involved". Marine Georesources and Geotechnology. 41 (6): 589–619. Bibcode:2023MGG....41..589C. doi:10.1080/1064119X.2022.2078252. hdl:11250/3058338.
- Cathie D.N., Jaeck C., Ballard J.-C. and Wintgens J.-F. (2005) Pipeline geotechnics – state-of-the-art. In: S.C.M. Gourvenec (Editor), Frontiers in Offshore Geotechnics. Taylor & Francis, Perth, Australia, pp. 95–114.
- Das B.M. (2010) Principles of geotechnical engineering, Cengage Learning, Stamfort, U.S.A., 666 p.
- Dean E.T.R. (2010) Offshore Geotechnical Engineering – Principles and Practice, Thomas Telford, Reston, VA, U.S.A., 520 p.
- Gerwick B.C., (2000) Construction of marine and offshore structures, CRC Press, Boca Raton, U.S.A., 657 p.
- Hogan P., Lane A., Hooper J., Broughton A. and Romans B. (2008) Geohazard challenges of the Woodside OceanWay Secure Energy LNG development, offshore Southern California, Proceedings of the 40th Offshore Technology Conference (OTC), Paper OTC19563, Houston.
- Kolk H.J. and Wegerif J. (2005) Offshore site investigations: new frontiers. In: S.C.M. Gourvenec (Editor), Frontiers in Offshore Geotechnics, Taylor & Francis, Perth, Australia, pp. 145–161.
- Newson T.A., Bransby M.F., Brunning P. and Morrow D.R. (2004) Determination of undrained shear strength parameters for buried pipeline stability in deltaic soft clays, Proceedings of the 14th International Offshore and Polar Engineering Conference, The International Society of Offshore and Polar Engineers (ISOPE), Toulon, pp. 38–48.
- Palmer, A.C. and Been K. (2011) Pipeline geohazards for Arctic conditions. In: W.O. McCarron (Editor), Deepwater Foundations and Pipeline Geomechanics, J. Ross Publishing, Fort Lauderdale, Florida, pp. 171–188.
- Peuchen L.J. and Raap C., (2007) Logging, sampling and testing for offshore geohazards, Proceedings of the 39th Offshore Technology Conference (OTC), Paper 18664, Houston.
- Ramakrishnan T.V. (2008). Offshore Engineering, Gene-Tech Books, New Delhi, India, 347 p.
- Randolph M. and Gourvenec S. (2011) Offshore geotechnical engineering, Spon Press, N.Y., 550 p.
- Younes A.I., Gibson J.L. and Shipp R.C. (2005) Geohazard assessment of the deepwater Princess field in the Northeastern Gulf of Mexico: Example of evaluating complex faulting in a subsea development, Proceedings of the 37th Offshore Technology Conference (OTC), Paper 17577, Houston.
- Zhang J. and Erbrich C.T. (2005) Stability design of untrenched pipelines – geotechnical aspects. In: S.C.M. Gourvenec (Editor), Frontiers in Offshore Geotechnics, Taylor & Francis, Perth, Australia, pp. 623–628.
