= Plus–minus method =

The plus–minus method, also known as CRM (conventional reciprocal method), is a geophysical method to analyze seismic refraction data developed by J. G. Hagedoorn. It can be used to calculate the depth and velocity variations of an undulating layer boundary for slope angles less than ~10°.

== Theory ==
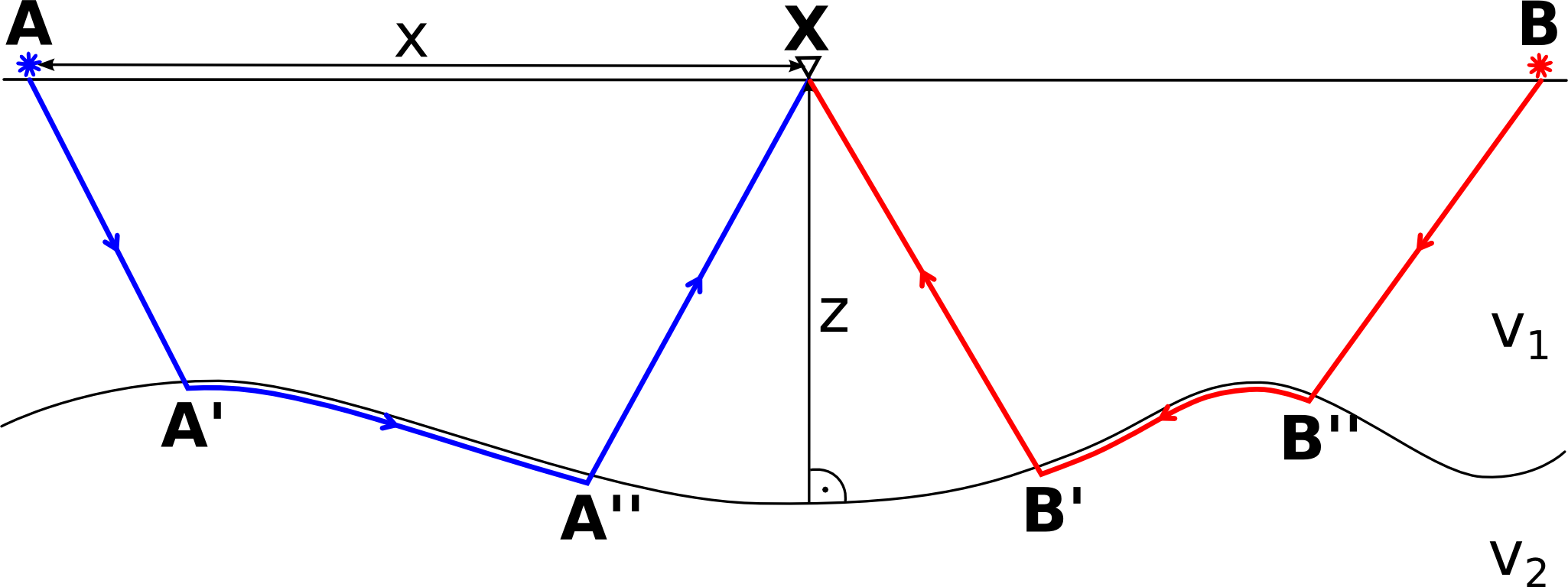
Sketch of the plus–minus method illustrating the ray paths between sources A and B and the receiver X

In the plus–minus method, the near surface is modeled as a layer above a halfspace where both the layer and the halfspace are allowed to have varying velocities. The method is based on the analysis of the so-called 'plus time' $t^+$ and 'minus time' $t^-$ that are given by:

$$t^+ = t_{AX} + t_{BX} - t_{AB}$$
$$t^- = t_{AX} - t_{BX} - t_{AB}$$

where $t_{AB}$ is the traveltime from A to B, $t_{AX}$ the traveltime from A to X and $t_{BX}$ the traveltime from B to X.

Assuming that the layer boundary is planar between A'' and B'' and that the dip is small (<10°), the plus time $t^+$ corresponds to the intercept time in classic refraction analysis and the minus time $t^-$ can be expressed as:

$$t^- = t^+ + \frac{2x}{v_2}$$

where $x$ is the offset between A and X and $v_2$ is the velocity of the halfspace.

Therefore, the slope of the minus time $\triangle t^-/\triangle x$ can be used to estimate the velocity of the halfspace $v_2$:

$$v_2(x) = 2 \frac{\triangle x}{\triangle t^-}$$

The interval $\triangle x$ over which the slope is estimated should be chosen according to data quality. A larger $\triangle x$ results in more stable velocity estimates but also introduces stronger smoothing. Like in classical refraction analysis, the thickness of the upper layer can be derived from the intercept time $t^+$:

$$z(x) = \frac{t^+ v_1(x) v_2(x)}{ 2 \sqrt{v_2^2 - v_1^2}}$$

This requires an estimation of the velocity of the upper layer $v_1(x)$ which can be obtained from the direct wave in the traveltime diagram.

Furthermore, the results of the plus–minus method can be used to calculate the shot-receiver static shift $\triangle \tau(x)$:

$$\triangle \tau(x) = - \frac{z(x)}{v_1(x)} + \frac{E_X - E_S + z(x)}{v_2(x)}$$

where $E_X$ is the datum elevation and $E_S$ the surface elevation at station X.

== Applications ==
The plus–minus method was developed for shallow seismic surveys where a thin, low velocity weathering layer covers the more solid basement. The thickness of the weathering layer is, among others, important for static corrections in reflection seismic processing or for engineering purposes. An important advantage of the method is that it does not require manual interpretation of the intercept time or the crossover point. This makes it is also easy to implement in computer programs. However, it is only applicable if the layer boundary is planar in parts and the dips are small. These assumptions often lead to smoothing of the actual topography of the layer boundary. Nowadays, the plus–minus method has mostly been replaced by more advanced inversion methods that have less restrictions. However, the plus–minus method is still used for real-time processing in the field because of its simplicity and low computational costs.
