= Seismic refraction =

Geophysical principle

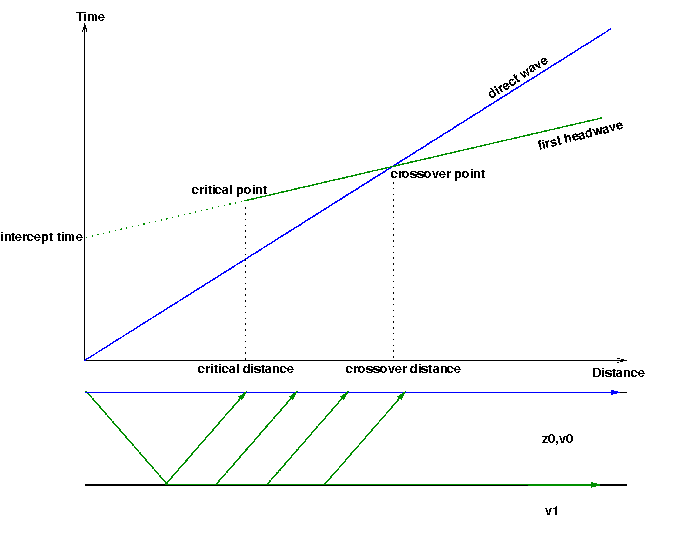
Propagating seismic waves (bottom) and related travel time diagram (top) of the direct (blue) and the first refracted phase (green)

Seismic refraction is a geophysical principle governed by Snell's Law of refraction. The seismic refraction method utilizes the refraction of seismic waves by rock or soil layers to characterize the subsurface geologic conditions and geologic structure.

Seismic refraction is exploited in engineering geology, geotechnical engineering and exploration geophysics. Seismic refraction traverses (seismic lines) are performed using an array of seismographs or geophones and an energy source.

The methods depend on the fact that seismic waves have differing velocities in different types of soil or rock. The waves are refracted when they cross the boundary between different types (or conditions) of soil or rock. The methods enable the general soil types and the approximate depth to strata boundaries, or to bedrock, to be determined.

== P-wave refraction ==
P-wave refraction evaluates the compression wave generated by the seismic source located at a known distance from the array. The wave is generated by vertically striking a striker plate with a sledgehammer, shooting a seismic shotgun into the ground, or detonating an explosive charge in the ground. Since the compression wave is the fastest of the seismic waves, it is sometimes referred to as the primary wave and is usually more-readily identifiable within the seismic recording as compared to the other seismic waves.

== S-wave refraction ==
S-wave refraction evaluates the shear wave generated by the seismic source located at a known distance from the array. The wave is generated by horizontally striking an object on the ground surface to induce the shear wave. Since the shear wave is the second fastest wave, it is sometimes referred to as the secondary wave. When compared to the compression wave, the shear wave is approximately one-half (but may vary significantly from this estimate) the velocity depending on the medium.

== Two horizontal layers ==
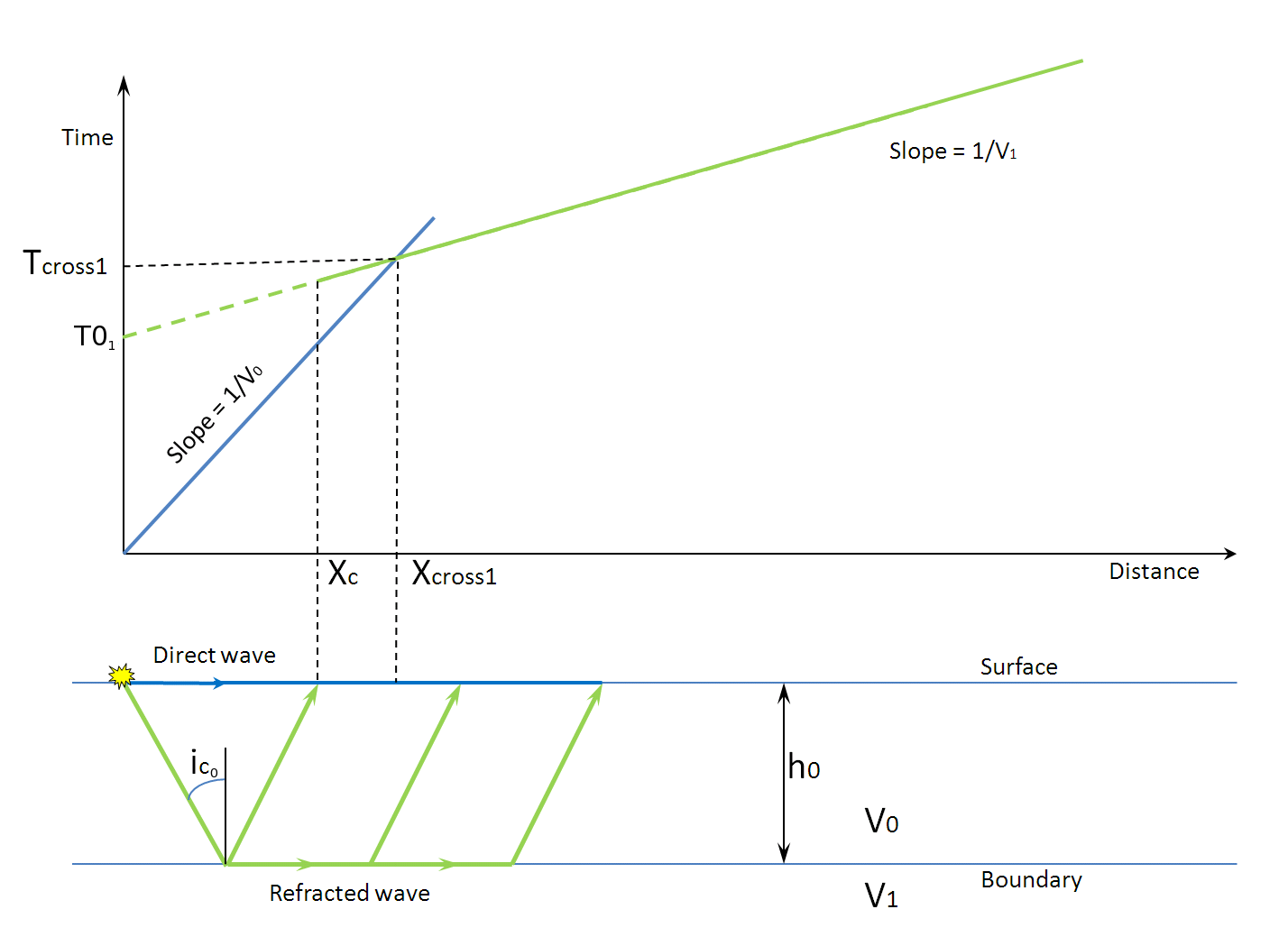
Two layers model.

i_{c_{0}} - critical angle
V_{0} - velocity of the first layer
V_{1} - velocity of the second layer
h_{0} - thickness of the first layer
T0_{1} - intercept

$$i_{c_{0}} = asin \left( {V_{0} \over V_{1}} \right)$$
$$T = {2h_{0}cos(i_{c_{0}}) \over V_{0}} + {X \over V_{1}} = T0_{1} + {X \over V_{1}}$$
$$h_{0}= {T0_{1}V_{0} \over 2cos(i_{c}) }$$
$$h_{0} = {X_{cross_{1}} \over 2} \sqrt{{V_{1}-V_{0} \over V_{1} + V_{0}}}$$

== Several horizontal layers ==
$$h_{n} = {V_{n} \over cos(i_{n})} \left( {T0_{n+1} \over 2} - \sum_{j=0}^{n-1}{h_{j}\sqrt{{1 \over V_{j}^2} - {1 \over V_{n+1}^2}}} \right)$$

== Inversion methods ==
- The General Reciprocal method
- The Plus minus method
- Refraction inversion modeling (refraction tomography)
- Monte Carlo simulation
- Genetic algorithms

== Applications ==
Seismic refraction has been successfully applied to tailings characterisation through P- and S-wave travel time tomographic inversions.

== See also ==
- Reflection seismology
- Seismic wide-angle reflection and refraction
