= Suction caisson =

Open bottomed tube anchor embedded and released by pressure differential

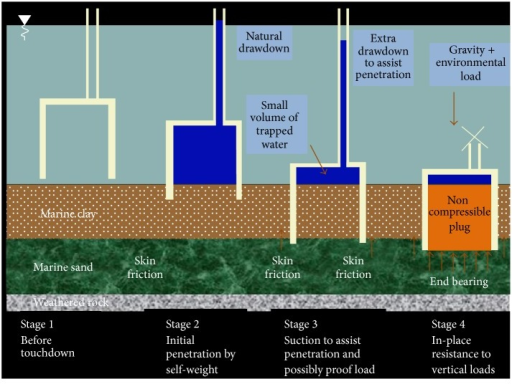
Suction caisson installation

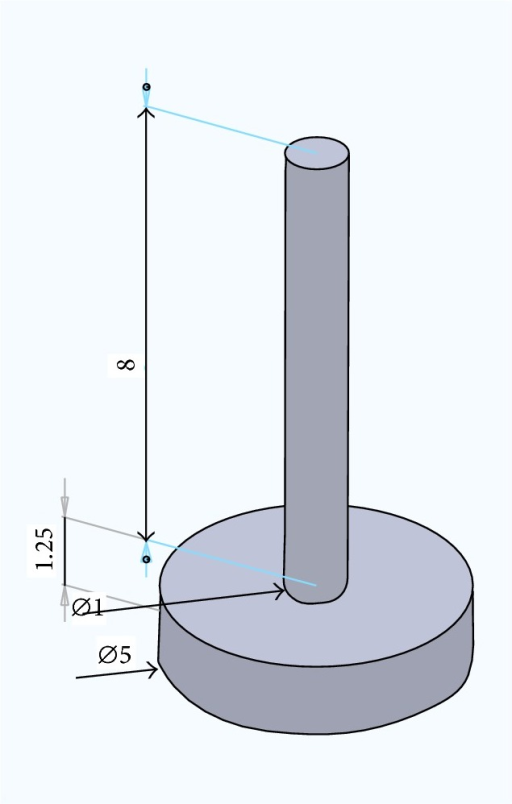
Suction caisson. Chart with dimension. Designed for supporting structures in deep waters. The dimension for the top suctions caisson is 8 m × ⌀1 m and for the bottom suctions caisson is 1 m × ⌀5 m.

Suction caissons (also referred to as suction anchors, suction piles or suction buckets) are a form of fixed platform anchor in the form of an open bottomed tube embedded in the sediment and sealed at the top while in use so that lifting forces generate a pressure differential that holds the caisson down. They have a number of advantages over conventional offshore foundations, mainly being quicker to install than deep foundation piles and being easier to remove during decommissioning. Suction caissons are now used extensively worldwide for anchoring large offshore installations, like oil platforms, offshore drillings and accommodation platforms to the seafloor at great depths. In recent years, suction caissons have also seen usage for both fixed and floating offshore wind turbines.

Oil and gas recovery at great depth could have been a very difficult task without the suction anchor technology, which was developed and used for the first time in the North Sea 30 years ago. The use of suction caissons/anchors has now become common practice worldwide. Statistics from 2002 revealed that 485 suction caissons had been installed in more than 50 different localities around the world, in depths to about 2000 m. Suction caissons have been installed in most of the deep water oil producing areas around the world, including The North Sea, Gulf of Mexico, offshore West Africa, offshore Brazil, West of Shetland, South China Sea, Adriatic Sea and Timor Sea. No reliable statistics have been produced after 2002, but the use of suction caissons is still rising.

== Description ==
A suction caisson can effectively be described as an inverted bucket that is embedded in the marine sediment. Attachment to the sea bed is achieved either through pushing or by creating a negative pressure inside the caisson skirt by pumping water out of the caisson; both of these techniques have the effect of securing the caisson into the sea bed. The foundation can also be rapidly removed by reversing the installation process, pumping water into the caisson to create an overpressure.

The concept of suction technology was developed for projects where gravity loading is not sufficient for pressing foundation skirts into the ground. The technology was also developed for anchors subject to large tension forces due to waves and stormy weather. The suction caisson technology functions very well in a seabed with soft clays or other low strength sediments. The suction caissons are in many cases easier to install than piles, which must be driven (hammered) into the ground with a pile driver.

Mooring lines are usually attached to the side of the suction caisson at the optimal load attachment point, which must be calculated for each caisson. Once installed, the caisson acts much like a short rigid pile and is capable of resisting both lateral and axial loads. Limit equilibrium methods or 3D finite element analysis are used to calculate the holding capacity.

== History ==
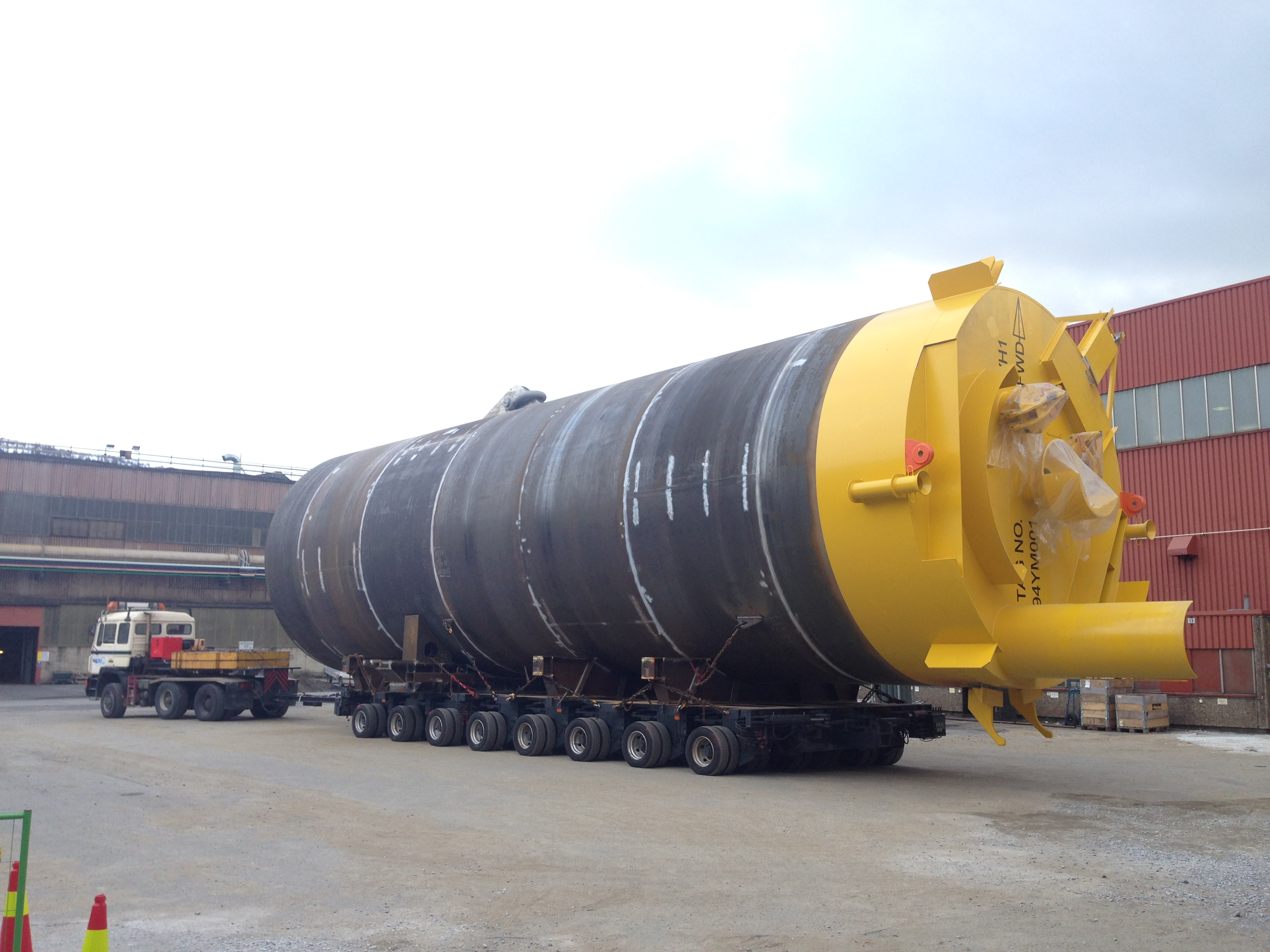
One of the 17 suction anchors for the Aasta Hansteen platform in the Norwegian Sea

Suction caissons were first used as anchors for floating structures in the offshore oil and gas industry, including offshore platforms such as the Draupner E oil rig.

There are great differences between the first small suction caissons that were installed for Shell at the Gorm field in the North Sea in 1981 and the large suction caissons that were installed for the Diana platform in the Gulf of Mexico in 1999. The twelve suction caissons on the Gorm field were intended to secure a simple loading buoy device at a depth of 40 metres, while the installation of suction anchors for the Diana platform was a world record in itself at that time, concerning water depth and size of anchors. The height of the Diana suction caissons is 30 metres, their diameter 6.5 metres, and they were installed at a depth of about 1500 m on soft clay deposits. Since then, suction caissons have been installed at even larger depths, but the Diana installation was a technology breakthrough for the 20th century. An important development step for the suction caisson technology emerged from cooperation between the former operator in the North Sea, Saga Petroleum AS, and Norwegian Geotechnical Institute (NGI). Saga Petroleum's oil-producing Snorre A platform was a tension-leg platform of a type that in other parts of the world would have been founded with up to 90 metres long piles. Unfortunately on the Snorre oil field, it was difficult to use long piles due to the presence of huge pebbles at 60 m depth under the seabed. Saga Petroleum decided therefore to use suction caissons, which were analysed by NGI. These analyses were verified from extensive model tests. The calculations showed that the platform could be safely secured by suction caissons of only 12 m in length. Snorre A started to produce oil in 1992 and is now operated by the Norwegian oil company Statoil.

Suction buckets were tested with offshore wind turbines at Frederikshavn in 2002, at Horns Rev in 2008 and Borkum Riffgrund in 2014, and are to be used in a third of the foundations at the initial development at Hornsea Wind Farm. Statoil have gone on to use the technology for windfarms. They are also planned to be used for some of the wind turbines in the Hornsea Project One wind farm scheduled to be completed in 2020. Similarly, a suction bucket contract has been awarded for the Aberdeen Bay Wind Farm. Suction anchors were also used for Hywind Scotland, the world's first commercial floating wind farm.

== Gravity oil platforms ==
Suction caissons have a lot of similarities with foundation design principles and solutions for the big gravity oil platforms that were installed in the North Sea when the offshore oil production started there in the beginning of 1970's. The first gravity oil platform on the Ekofisk oil field had a foundation area that was as big as a football field, and it was placed on a seabed with very dense sand. The platform was designed to tolerate waves up to 24 m in height.

As the installation of oil platforms continued in the North Sea, in areas with poor ground conditions such as soft clays, they were designed to survive even higher storm waves. These platforms were founded on a system of cylindrical skirts that were penetrated into the ground under combined gravity load and underpressure. The oil platform at the Gullfaks C field was equipped with 22 m long skirts. The Troll A platform is founded in 330 m depth with 30 m long skirts and is the world's biggest gravity platform.

== Research and development ==
The Norwegian Geotechnical Institute (NGI) has been heavily involved with the concept development, design and installation of suction anchors from the start. The project "Application of offshore bucket foundations and anchors in lieu of conventional designs" (1994-1998) was sponsored by 15 international petroleum and industry companies and was one of the most important studies. The project “Skirted foundations and anchors in clay” (1997-1999) was sponsored by 19 international companies organized through the Offshore Technology Research Center (OTRC) in the US, and the project “Skirted offshore foundations and anchors in sand” (1997-2000) was sponsored by 8 international companies. The main conclusions from the projects were presented in the 1999 OTC paper no 10824.

An industry sponsored study on the design and analysis of deepwater anchors in soft clay was completed in 2003, where NGI participated together with OTRC and Centre for Offshore Foundation Systems (COFS) in Australia. The overall objective was to provide the API Geotechnical Workgroup (RG7) and the Deepstar Joint Industry Project VI with background, data and other information needed to develop a widely applicable recommended practice for the design and installation of deepwater anchors.

The Norwegian classification society DNV (Det Norske Veritas), active worldwide in risk analysis and safety evaluation of special constructions, has produced a recommended practice report on the design procedures for suction anchors which is based on close cooperation with NGI. The main information from the project was presented in the 2006 OTC paper no 18038.

In 2002 NGI established the subsidiary NGI Inc in Houston. The subsidiary has since been awarded the detailed geotechnical design for more than 15 suction anchor projects in the Gulf of Mexico, and among these the challenging Mad Dog Spar project involving design of anchors located in old slide deposits below the Sigsbee Escarpment. For further information reference can be made to the 2006 OTC papers no 17949 and 17950.

== See also ==
- Cofferdam – Barrier allowing liquid to be pumped out of an enclosed area, a temporary water-excluding structure built in place, sometimes surrounding a working area as does an open caisson.
- Offshore geotechnical engineering – Sub-field of engineering concerned with human-made structures in the sea, for information on geotechnical considerations.
- Civil engineering – Engineering discipline focused on physical infrastructure
- Marine engineering – Engineering and design of shipboard systems
- Ocean engineering – Engineering and design of shipboard systems
- Marine architecture – Branch of architecture focused on coastal, near-shore and off-shore construction
- Oceanography – Scientific study of the ocean
- Earth materials – Naturally occurring materials found on Earth
- Floating wind turbine – Type of wind turbine
- Geotechnical engineering – Scientific study of earth materials in engineering problems
- Geotechnical investigation – Study of properties of soil earthworks
- Geotechnics – Scientific study of earth materials in engineering problems
- Ocean – Body of salt water covering most of Earth
- Offshore construction – Installation of structures and facilities in a marine environment
- Offshore (hydrocarbons) – Oil industry operations at sea
- Submarine pipeline – Pipeline that is laid on the seabed or below it inside a trench
- Subsea (technology) – Technology of submerged operations in the sea
- Subsea production system – Wells located on the seabed
- Wellhead – Component at the surface of a well
