= List of agricultural journals =

List of academic journals in agriculture

This is a list of agricultural journals which includes notable peer-reviewed scientific journals that publish research in agriculture, agronomy, crop science, soil science, horticulture, plant pathology, animal science, and related fields.

== Journals ==
- Acta Agriculturae Scandinavica B
- African Crop Science Journal
- African Journal of Range & Forage Science
- Agricultural and Forest Meteorology
- Agricultural Economics
- Agriculture, Ecosystems & Environment
- Agronomy Journal
- American Journal of Agricultural Economics
- American Journal of Enology and Viticulture
- Animal (journal)
- Annual Review of Phytopathology
- Aquaculture (journal)
- Aquaculture International
- Aquaculture Research
- Australasian Agribusiness Review
- BioControl
- Bioscience, Biotechnology, and Biochemistry
- Bulgarian Journal of Agricultural Science
- Cahiers Agricultures
- California Agriculture
- Crop & Pasture Science
- Crop Science
- Fisheries Research
- Folia Horticulturae
- Hilgardia
- HortScience
- Indian Journal of Agricultural Sciences
- Journal of Agrarian Change
- Journal of Agricultural and Environmental Ethics
- Journal of Agricultural and Food Chemistry
- Journal of Agricultural Economics
- Journal of Agricultural, Biological and Environmental Statistics
- The Journal of Agricultural Science
- Journal of Animal Science
- Journal of Central European Agriculture
- Journal of Dairy Science
- Journal of Experimental Botany
- Journal of Horticultural Sciences
- The Journal of Peasant Studies
- Journal of Plantation Crops
- Journal of Soil and Water Conservation
- Journal of the Science of Food and Agriculture
- Open Agriculture
- Pertanika Journal of Tropical Agricultural Science
- Pest Management Science
- Phytopathology (journal)
- Plant and Soil
- Plant Disease (journal)
- Plant Physiology
- Potato Research
- Queensland Agricultural Journal
- Rangifer (journal)
- Renewable Agriculture and Food Systems
- Review of Agrarian Studies
- Soil Biology and Biochemistry
- Soil Research
- Theoretical and Applied Genetics
- Transactions of the ASABE
- Tropical Grasslands (journal)
- Tropicultura
- Zemědělská ekonomika

== See also ==
- Agrivoltaics
- Indian Council of Agricultural Research
- List of biology journals
- List of environmental journals
- List of scientific journals
- Precision agriculture

=== Agriculture conferences ===
- Paris International Agricultural Show
- Annual Biocontrol Industry Meeting
- InfoAg Conference
- International Horticultural Congress
- New Harvest
