= Mariculture =

Marine System

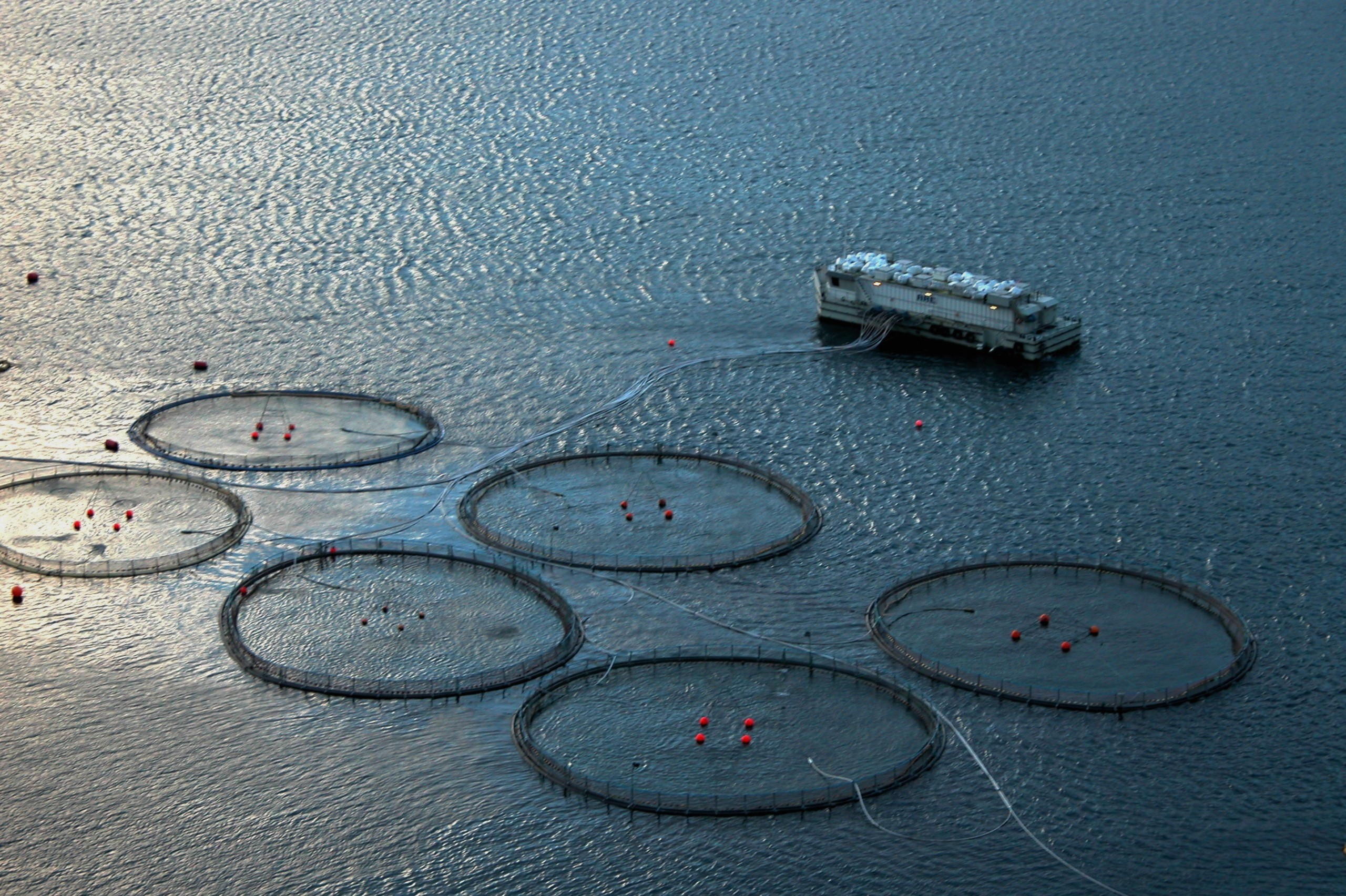
Salmon pens off Vestmanna in the Faroe Islands, an example of inshore mariculture

Mariculture, sometimes called marine farming or marine aquaculture, is a branch of aquaculture involving the cultivation of marine organisms for food and other animal products, in seawater. Subsets of it include (offshore mariculture), fish farms built on littoral waters (inshore mariculture), or in artificial tanks, ponds or raceways which are filled with seawater (onshore mariculture). An example of the latter is the farming of plankton and seaweed, shellfish like shrimp or oysters, and marine finfish, in saltwater ponds. Non-food products produced by mariculture include fish meal, nutrient agar, jewellery (e.g. cultured pearls), and cosmetics.

== Types ==
=== Onshore ===
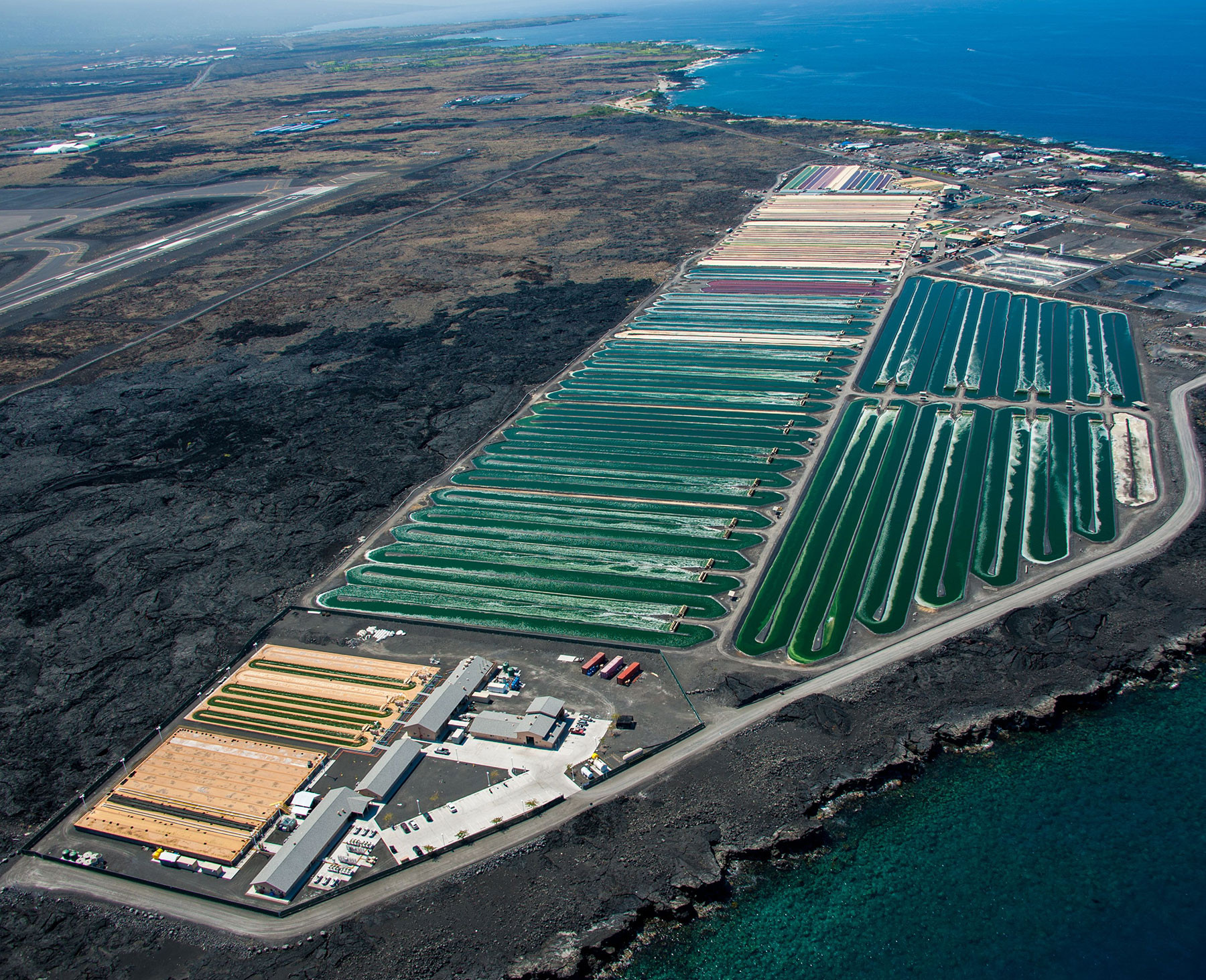
An onshore microalgae cultivation facility in Hawaii

Although it sounds like a paradox, mariculture is practiced onshore variously in tanks, ponds or raceways which are supplied with seawater. The distinguishing traits of onshore mariculture are the use of seawater rather than fresh, and that food and nutrients are provided by the water column, not added artificially, a great savings in cost and preservation of the species' natural diet. Examples of onshore mariculture include the farming of algae (including plankton and seaweed), marine finfish, and shellfish (like shrimp and oysters), in manmade saltwater ponds.

=== Inshore ===
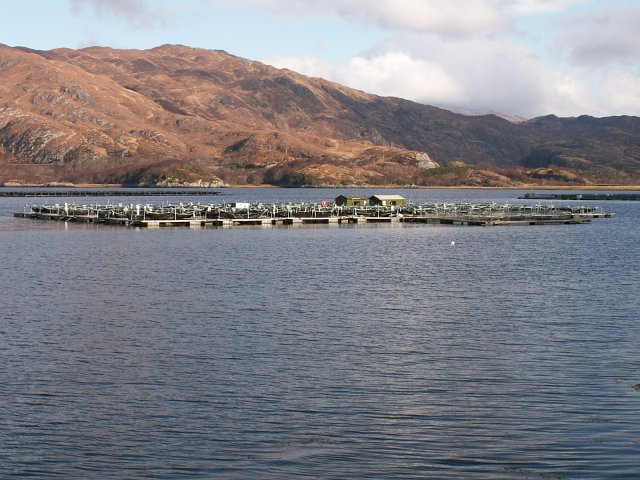
Fish cages containing salmon in Loch Ailort, Scotland, an inshore water

Inshore mariculture is farming marine species such as algae, fish, and shellfish in waters affected by the tide, which include both littoral waters and their estuarine environments, such as bays, brackish rivers, and naturally fed and flushing saltwater ponds.

Popular cultivation techniques for inshore mariculture include creating or utilizing artificial reefs, pens, nets, and long-line arrays of floating cages moored to the bottom.

As a result of simultaneous global development and evolution over time, the term "ranch" being associated typically with inshore mariculture techniques has proved problematical. It is applied without any standardized basis to everything from marine species being raised in floating pens, nested within artificial reefs, tended in cages (by the hundreds and even thousands) in long-lined groups, and even operant conditioning migratory species to return to the waters where they were born for harvesting (also known as "enhanced stocking"). (Note: As is done in Japan where fishermen raise hatchlings in a closely knitted net in a harbor, sounding an underwater horn before each feeding. When the fish are old enough they are freed from the net to mature in the open sea. During spawning season, about 80% of these fish return to their birthplace. The fishermen sound the horn and then net those fish that respond.)

=== Open ocean ===
Raising marine organisms under controlled offshore in "open ocean" in exposed, high-energy marine environments beyond significant coastal influence, is a relatively new approach to mariculture. Open ocean aquaculture (OOA) uses cages, nets, or long-line arrays that are moored or towed. Open ocean mariculture has the potential to be combined with offshore energy installation systems, such as wind-farms, to enable a more effective use of ocean space.

Research and commercial open ocean aquaculture facilities are in operation or under development in Panama, Australia, Chile, China, France, Ireland, Italy, Japan, Mexico, and Norway. As of 2004, two commercial open ocean facilities were operating in U.S. waters, raising threadfin near Hawaii and cobia near Puerto Rico. An operation targeting bigeye tuna recently received final approval. All U.S. commercial facilities are currently sited in waters under state or territorial jurisdiction. The largest deep water open ocean farm in the world is raising cobia 12 km off the northern coast of Panama in highly exposed sites.

== Species ==
=== Algae ===
Algaculture involves the farming of species of algae, including microalgae (such as phytoplankton) and macroalgae (such as seaweed).

Uses of commercial and industrial algae cultivation include production of nutraceuticals such as omega-3 fatty acids (as algal oil) or natural food colorants and dyes, food, fertilizers, bioplastics, chemical feedstock (raw material), protein-rich animal/aquaculture feed, pharmaceuticals, and algal fuel, and can also be used as a means of pollution control and natural carbon sequestration.

Mariculture of seaweeds can be conducted in the open ocean to regenerate decimated fish populations by providing both habitat and the basis of a trophic pyramid for marine life. Natural seaweed ecosystems can possibly be replicated in the open ocean by creating growth conditions. Von Hertzen, Gamble, and others propose that this practice could be considered to be permaculture and thereby constitute marine permaculture. The concept envisions using artificial upwelling and floating, submerged platforms as substrate to replicate natural seaweed ecosystems. Following the principles of permaculture, seaweeds and fish from marine permaculture arrays can be sustainably harvested with the potential of sequestering atmospheric carbon, should seaweeds sink below a depth of one kilometer. As of 2020, successful trials had taken place in Hawaii, the Philippines, Puerto Rico and Tasmania. The idea received substantial public attention, notably featuring as a key solution covered by Damon Gameau's documentary 2040 and in the book Drawdown: The Most Comprehensive Plan Ever Proposed to Reverse Global Warming.

=== Shellfish ===
Similarly to algae cultivation, shellfish can be farmed in multiple ways in both onshore and inshore mariculture: on ropes, in bags or cages, or directly on (or within) the bottom. Shellfish mariculture does not require feed or fertilizer inputs, nor insecticides or antibiotics, making shellfish mariculture a self-supporting system. Seed for shellfish cultivation is typically produced in commercial hatcheries, or by the farmers themselves. Among the shellfish types raised by mariculture are shrimp, oysters (including artificial pearl cultivation), clams, mussels, and abalone. Shellfish can also be used in integrated multi-species cultivation techniques, where shellfish can utilize waste generated by higher trophic-level organisms.

The Māori people of New Zealand retain traditions of farming shellfish.

=== Finfish ===
Finfish species raised in mariculture include salmon, cod, scallops, certain species of prawn, European lobsters, abalone and sea cucumbers. The most common method used to raise these species in the marine environment involves net pens or cages suspended in the ocean or large coastal embayments. These structures are anchored to the seabed or moored to floats, allowing high volumes of clean, naturally circulating seawater to flow through and supply the fish with oxygen while flushing away waste.

Fish species selected to be raised in saltwater pens do not have any additional artificial feed requirements, as they live off of the naturally occurring nutrients within the water column. Typical practice calls for the juveniles to be planted on the bottom of the body of water within the pen, which utilize more of the water column within their sea pen as they grow and develop. However, in intensive farming systems used for high-value finfish like salmon, the fish are typically fed manufactured, nutritionally complete pelleted feed, which is often delivered automatically to maintain efficient growth rates. The strategic site selection of these marine farms is crucial, requiring careful assessment of water depth, current speeds, shelter from storms, and proximity to shore to ensure optimal fish health and minimal environmental impact.

== Environmental effects ==
Mariculture has rapidly expanded over the last two decades due to new technology, improvements in formulated feeds, greater biological understanding of farmed species, increased water quality within closed farm systems, greater demand for seafood products, site expansion and government interest. As a consequence, mariculture has been subject to some controversy regarding its social and environmental impacts. Commonly identified environmental impacts from marine farms are:

- Wastes from cage cultures
- Farm escapees and invasives
- Genetic pollution and disease and parasite transfer
- Habitat modification

As with most farming practices, the degree of environmental impact depends on the size of the farm, the cultured species, stock density, type of feed, hydrography of the site, and husbandry methods. The adjacent diagram connects these causes and effects.

=== Wastes from cage cultures ===
Mariculture of finfish can require a significant amount of fishmeal or other high protein food sources. Originally, a lot of fishmeal went to waste due to inefficient feeding regimes and poor digestibility of formulated feeds which resulted in poor feed conversion ratios.

In cage culture, several different methods are used for feeding farmed fish – from simple hand feeding to sophisticated computer-controlled systems with automated food dispensers coupled with in situ uptake sensors that detect consumption rates. In coastal fish farms, overfeeding primarily leads to increased disposition of detritus on the seafloor (potentially smothering seafloor dwelling invertebrates and altering the physical environment), while in hatcheries and land-based farms, excess food goes to waste and can potentially impact the surrounding catchment and local coastal environment. This impact is usually highly local, and depends significantly on the settling velocity of waste feed and the current velocity (which varies both spatially and temporally) and depth.

=== Farm escapees and invasives ===
The impact of escapees from aquaculture operations depends on whether or not there are wild conspecifics or close relatives in the receiving environment, and whether or not the escapee is reproductively capable. Several different mitigation/prevention strategies are currently employed, from the development of infertile triploids to land-based farms which are completely isolated from any marine environment. Escapees can adversely impact local ecosystems through hybridization and loss of genetic diversity in native stocks, increase negative interactions within an ecosystem (such as predation and competition), disease transmission and habitat changes (from trophic cascades and ecosystem shifts to varying sediment regimes and thus turbidity).

The accidental introduction of invasive species is also of concern. Aquaculture is one of the main vectors for invasives following accidental releases of farmed stocks into the wild. One example is the Siberian sturgeon (Acipenser baerii) which accidentally escaped from a fish farm into the Gironde Estuary (Southwest France) following a severe storm in December 1999 (5,000 individual fish escaped into the estuary which had never hosted this species before). Molluscan farming is another example whereby species can be introduced to new environments by ‘hitchhiking’ on farmed molluscs. Also, farmed molluscs themselves can become dominate predators and/or competitors, as well as potentially spread pathogens and parasites.

=== Genetic pollution, disease, and parasite transfer ===
One of the primary concerns with mariculture is the potential for disease and parasite transfer. Farmed stocks are often selectively bred to increase disease and parasite resistance, as well as improving growth rates and quality of products. As a consequence, the genetic diversity within reared stocks decreases with every generation – meaning they can potentially reduce the genetic diversity within wild populations if they escape into those wild populations. Such genetic pollution from escaped aquaculture stock can reduce the wild population's ability to adjust to the changing natural environment. Species grown by mariculture can also harbour diseases and parasites (e.g., lice) which can be introduced to wild populations upon their escape. An example of this is the parasitic sea lice on wild and farmed Atlantic salmon in Canada. Also, non-indigenous species which are farmed may have resistance to, or carry, particular diseases (which they picked up in their native habitats) which could be spread through wild populations if they escape into those wild populations. Such ‘new’ diseases would be devastating for those wild populations because they would have no immunity to them.

=== Habitat modification ===
With the exception of benthic habitats directly beneath marine farms, most mariculture causes minimal destruction to habitats. However, the destruction of mangrove forests from the farming of shrimps is of concern. Globally, shrimp farming activity is a small contributor to the destruction of mangrove forests; however, locally it can be devastating. Mangrove forests provide rich matrices which support a great deal of biodiversity – predominately juvenile fish and crustaceans. Furthermore, they act as buffering systems whereby they reduce coastal erosion, and improve water quality for in situ animals by processing material and ‘filtering’ sediments.

=== Others ===
In addition, nitrogen and phosphorus compounds from food and waste may lead to blooms of phytoplankton, whose subsequent degradation can drastically reduce oxygen levels. If the algae are toxic, fish are killed and shellfish contaminated. These algal blooms are sometimes referred to as harmful algal blooms, which are caused by a high influx of nutrients, such as nitrogen and phosphorus, into the water due to run-off from land based human operations.

Over the course of rearing various species, the sediment on bottom of the specific body of water becomes highly metallic with influx of copper, zinc and lead that is being introduced to the area. This influx of these heavy metals is likely due to the buildup of fish waste, uneaten fish feed, and the paint that comes off the boats and floats that are used in the mariculture operations.

== Sustainability ==
Mariculture development may be sustained by basic and applied research and development in major fields such as nutrition, genetics, system management, product handling, and socioeconomics. One approach uses closed systems that have no direct interaction with the local environment. However, investment and operational cost are currently significantly higher than with open cages, limiting closed systems to their current role as hatcheries. Many studies have estimated that seafood will run out by 2048. Farmed fish will also become crucial to feeding the growing human population that will potentially reach 9.8 billion by 2050.

== Benefits ==
Sustainable mariculture promises economic and environmental benefits. Economies of scale imply that ranching can produce fish at lower cost than industrial fishing, leading to better human diets and the gradual elimination of unsustainable fisheries. Consistent supply and quality control has enabled integration in food market channels.

== List of species farmed ==
Fish

- Barramundi
- Bigeye tuna
- Cobia
- European sea bass
- Grouper
- Mullet
- Pearlspot
- Pomfret
- Pompano
- Salmon
- Snapper

Shellfish/crustaceans

- Abalone
- Mussels
- Oysters
- Prawn

Plants

- Seaweeds

== Scientific literature ==
Scientific literature on mariculture can be found in the following journals:

- Applied and Environmental Microbiology
- Aquaculture
- Aquaculture Research
- Journal of Experimental Marine Biology and Ecology
- Journal of Phycology
- Marine Resource Economics

== See also ==
- Algaculture
- Aquaculture
- Aquaponics
- Copper alloys in aquaculture
- Fish farming
- Hydroponics
- Integrated multi-trophic aquaculture
- Oyster farming
- Saltwater aquaponics
- Seaweed farming
