= Aquaculture of cobia =

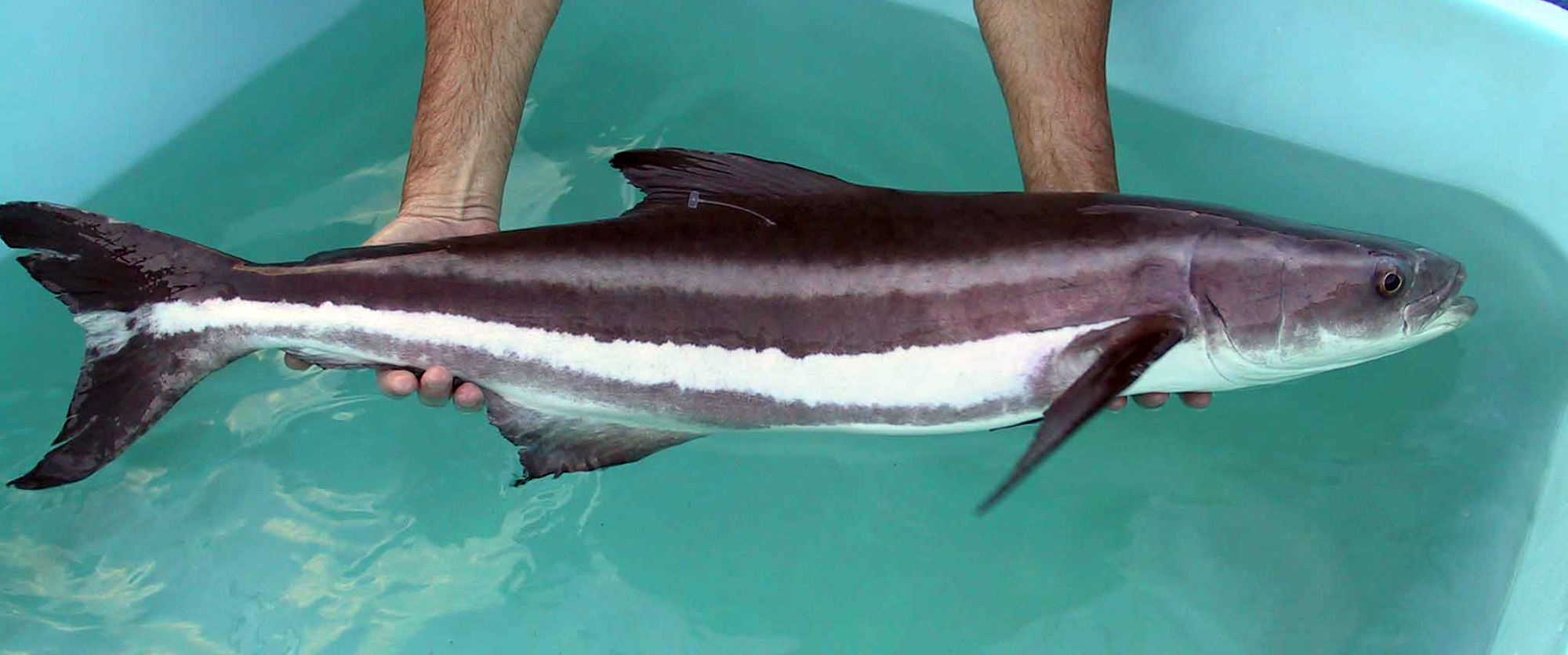
A female broodstock cobia weighing about 8 kilograms prior to transport to broodstock holding tanks

Cobia, a warm water fish, is one of the more suitable candidates for offshore aquaculture. Cobia are large pelagic fish, up to 2 metres (6.6 ft) long and 68 kilograms (150 lb) in weight. They are solitary fish except when spawning, found in warm-temperate to tropical waters.

Their rapid growth rate in aquaculture, as well as the high quality of their flesh, makes cobia potentially one of the more important potential marine fish for aquaculture production. Currently, cobia are cultured in nurseries and grow-out offshore cages in many parts of Asia and off the coast of the United States, Mexico and Panama. In Taiwan cobia weighing 100–600 grams are cultured for 1–1.5 years to reach the 6–8 kilograms (13–18 lb) needed for export to Japan. Currently, around 80% of marine cages in Taiwan are devoted to cobia culture. In 2004, the FAO reported that 80.6% of the world's cobia production was by China and Taiwan. After China and Taiwan, Vietnam is the third largest producer of farmed cobia in the world where production was estimated at 1500 tonnes in 2008. The possibility is also being examined of growing hatchery reared cobia in offshore cages around Puerto Rico and the Bahamas.

Greater depths, stronger currents, and distance from shore all act to reduce the environmental impacts often associated with fin fish aquaculture. Offshore cage systems could become some of the most environmentally sustainable methods for commercial marine fish aquaculture. However, some problems still exist in cobia culture that needs to be addressed and solved for increasing production. These include high mortality rates due to stress during transport from nursery tanks or inshore cages out to grow-out cages. Also, diseases in the nursery stage and the grow-out culture can result in low survival rates and a poor harvest.

== Production ==
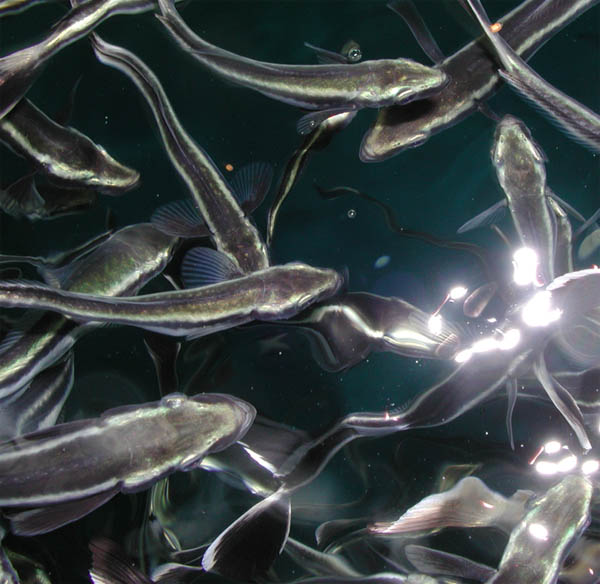
Cobia fingerlings in aquaculture

Wild cobia broodstock are captured by professional fishermen. The fish are transferred into onboard-tanks on a transport vessel for transport to hatchery facilities. They are anesthetized with clove oil if necessary to reduce stress during transportation. They are also treated for ectoparasites on their gills and skin that could proliferate later after transfer to maturation tanks.

Broodstock are reared in controlled ponds or tanks. These tanks are often stocked with cleaner fish, Gobiosoma oceanops, as a biological control for any remaining ectoparasites. The broodstock diet includes sardines, squid and formulated feeds, as well as vitamin and mineral supplements. The water temperature is used to control spawning.

The eggs are collected with a surface skimmer using mesh screen bags. The eggs are transferred to incubation tanks where they are disinfected for an hour with 100 ppm formalin.

Phytoplankton concentrations are maintained, and enriched Artemia nauplii and rotifers are fed to the cobia larvae for 3–7 days after they hatch. The larvae require rotifers for at least four days after hatching. The presence of enriched live prey in conjunction with live algae in rearing tanks has been shown to improve the way larvae grow and survive in recirculating systems.

Optimal rearing densities are required when rearing larvae. Even though water quality and food can be controlled, it has been shown that high rearing densities may still affect growth and survival of the larvae through responses related to crowding. In addition, juveniles exposed to varying salinities exhibited sustained growth and improved health at higher salinities, 15 and 30 ppt.

Cobia larvae metamorphose to gill respiration 11–15 days post hatching. At 15–25 days post hatching, cobia are weaned onto commercial formulated feeds. Rearing cobia larvae at salinities as low as 15 ppt is possible. Fully weaned fingerlings weighing up to one gram are transferred to juvenile culture tanks. Later cobia juveniles can be raised in ponds or shallow, near-shore submerged cages.

Juveniles thrive on a wide range of protein and lipid, but there are optimal levels where they get the most benefit. After an 8-week growth trial, juvenile cobia displayed a peak in their weight gain with a dietary protein concentration of 44.5%. Weight gain is also likely to increase as the lipid content in the diet increases. However, levels exceeding 15–18% produces little practical benefit because of higher fat accretion in the cobia. In addition, up to 40% of fish meal protein can be substituted with soybean meal protein before a reduction occurs in growth rates and protein utilization. Cobia has low feed conversion rates, yielding 1 kilogram of fish biomass for 1.8 kilograms of pellets which contain 50% fishmeal.

The cobia are then transferred to open ocean cages for final the grow-out when they reach 6–10 kilograms (13–22 lb). The growth rate and survival rate of cobia during grow-out stages in open water cages throughout the Caribbean and Americas vary from as little as 10% up to 90%. Low survival rates are mainly due to disease, but also to shark attacks which tear holes in the nets of cages in the Bahamas and Puerto Rico and allow caged cobia to escape. However, better growth rates were experienced in offshore cage farms in Taiwan. In addition, cobia are considered to be gonochoristic, with differential growth rates occurring between sexes. Females grow faster and have been shown to be significantly longer and heavier within year classes.

== Diseases ==
- Nephrocalcinosis (kidney stones) cause significant mortality during both the hatchery and grow-out stages. These stones vary in diameter from 2–6 millimetres (0.079–0.236 in) in the kidney and can block the urethra. This condition is not fully understood, but is thought to be a symptom of prolonged exposure to free carbon dioxide in excess of 10 mg/L. The ratio of calcium to magnesium in the diet could also be out of balance.
- A Sphaerospora-like myxosporean infection caused 90% mortality during one month in a marine cage cultured in Taiwan.

== Benefits and constraints ==
Offshore aquaculture, regardless of the species, is beneficial because it can avoid conflict with recreational activities and local fisherman, as well as potentially improving the coastal aesthetics. Further, repositioning aquaculture facilities in less polluted open water environments can produce better products, and the high flushing rates experienced in the open ocean reduces the effect of effluents on benthic communities.

However, such operations require more developed infrastructure than near-shore aquaculture systems, which makes them expensive. Offshore sites have access difficulties and much higher labour costs.

== See also ==
- List of harvested aquatic animals by weight
