= Barbara Hayden =

Barbara, Barb or Barbi Hayden may refer to

- Barb Hayden, New Zealand marine biologist
- Barbi Hayden (born 1990), American professional wrestler
- Pat Silver-Lasky (screen name Barbara Hayden), American actress, screenwriter, and writer
