= International Soil and Water Conservation Research =

- Cover of Volume 13, No. 3
- Discipline: Environmental sciences; Water resources; Soil science
- Language: English
- Edited by: Dennis Flanagan; Baoyuan Liu; Michael Maerker

Publication details
- History: 2013–present
- Publisher: Elsevier on behalf of KeAi Communications
- Frequency: Quarterly
- Open access: Yes
- License: CC BY-NC-ND
- Impact factor: 8.3 (2025)

Standard abbreviations
- ISO 4: Int. Soil Water Conserv. Res.

Indexing
- ISSN: 2095-6339 (print); 2589-059X (web)

Links
- Journal homepage; Online access

International Soil and Water Conservation Research (ISWCR), launched in June 2013, is an open-access, peer-reviewed international academic journal that publishes scholarly articles on a quarterly basis. It is a multidisciplinary journal for soil and water conservation research, practice, policy, and perspectives. The journal aims to disseminate new knowledge and promote the practice of soil and water conservation. The current editors-in-chief are Dennis Flanagan (Purdue University), Baoyuan Liu (Beijing Normal University), and Michael Maerker (University of Pavia).

== Overview and history ==
In 2014, ISWCR signed a collaboration agreement with Elsevier. Its online system with Elsevier was officially launched worldwide in March 2015, and all articles published are freely accessible through ScienceDirect under open access.

== Publishing scope ==
Serving as the official journal of the World Association of Soil and Water Conservation (WASWAC), ISWCR publishes original research articles, reviews, and discussions focusing on soil erosion, watershed management, water resources assessment and management, nonpoint source pollution, conservation models and technologies, farmland conservation, land degradation, and the sustainable use of soil and water resources.

== Abstracting and indexing ==
The journal is now indexed and abstracted by Web of Science's Science Citation Index Expanded (SCIE), Scopus, Directory of Open Access Journals (DOAJ), and CAB International (CABI). According to the Journal Citation Reports, the journal has a 2025 impact factor of 8.3, ranking 4th in the category of soil science (3/48).

== Most cited articles ==
Top 3 most cited articles ordered by the total citation numbers in Web of Science (＞200 cited times):

- Alewell, Christine; Borrelli, Pasquale; Meusburger, Katrin; Panagos, Panos (2019-06-18). "Using the USLE: Chances, challenges and limitations of soil erosion modelling". International Soil and Water Conservation Research. 7 (3): 203–225. Bibcode:2019ISWCR...7..203A. doi:10.1016/j.iswcr.2019.05.004.
- Nearing, Mark A.; Xie, Yun; Liu, Baoyuan; Ye, Yu (2017-04-18). "Natural and anthropogenic rates of soil erosion". International Soil and Water Conservation Research. 5 (2): 77–84. Bibcode:2017ISWCR...5...77N. doi:10.1016/j.iswcr.2017.04.001.
- Liu, Baoyuan; Xie, Yun; Li, Zhiguang; Liang, Yin; Zhang, Wenbo; Fu, Suhua; Yin, Shuiqing; Wei, Xin; Zhang, Keli; Wang, Zhiqiang; Liu, Yingna; Zhao, Ying; Guo, Qiankun (July 2020). "The assessment of soil loss by water erosion in China". International Soil and Water Conservation Research. 8 (4): 430–439. Bibcode:2020ISWCR...8..430L. doi:10.1016/j.iswcr.2020.07.002.

== See also ==
- Soil Biology and Biochemistry
- Plant and Soil
- International Journal of Sediment Research
- Environmental Research Letters
- Environmental Science & Technology
