= Barb Hayden =

New Zealand marine biologist

- Awards: Companion of the Royal Society of New Zealand, New Zealand Marine Sciences Society Award

Academic background
- Education: University of Otago
- Thesis: Factors affecting recruitment of farmed greenshell mussels, Perna canaliculus (Gmelin) 1791, in Marlborough Sounds (1995)
- Doctoral advisor: Mike Barker, John McKoy, John Blackburn Jillett

Academic work
- Institutions: National Institute of Water and Atmospheric Research

Barbara June Hayden is a New Zealand marine biologist, and is Chief Scientist at the National Institute of Water and Atmospheric Research (NIWA), specialising in marine biosecurity and aquaculture. In 2019 she was elected a Companion of the Royal Society Te Apārangi and awarded the New Zealand Marine Sciences Society Award.

== Academic career ==
Hayden grew up in New Plymouth, and gained a technical degree from Massey University. Working at the National Health Laboratories (now ESR), Hayden was responsible for assessing public safety of cultured shellfish, which led to her taking a job at the Fisheries Research Division of MAF. Hayden completed a PhD titled Factors affecting recruitment of farmed greenshell mussels, Perna canaliculus (Gmelin) 1791, in Marlborough Sounds at the University of Otago.

Hayden pioneered research on aquaculture and marine biosecurity. Hayden established the Ballast Water Working Group in 1987 in order to better manage concerns around biosecurity risks to aquaculture from introduced species from ship ballast waters. She was a founding member of the New Zealand Sanitation Committee, which drew up quality assurance guidelines for exported shellfish. Hayden was appointed Chief Scientist of NIWA's National Centre for Aquatic Biodiversity and Biosecurity in 2010, taking over from Don Robertson.

Hayden has been both Chair and Deputy Chair of the Biosecurity Ministerial Advisory Committee. She is a member of the International Union for Conservation of Nature Invasive Species Specialist Group. Hayden also serves on the Science System Advisory Group, advising the Ministry of Business, Innovation and Employment on the redesign of New Zealand's science system.

== Honours and awards ==
Hayden was elected a Companion of the Royal Society Te Apārangi in 2019.

In 2019 Hayden was awarded the New Zealand Marine Sciences Society Award "for her substantial contribution to marine science in New Zealand over a long and distinguished career that has included setting strategic research directions, leading major research programs, and mentoring emerging researchers".

== Personal life ==
Hayden is married to Dave Schiel, professor of marine science at the University of Canterbury.

== Selected works ==
- Joanne O’Callaghan; Craig Stevens; Moninya Roughan; et al. (2019). "Developing an Integrated Ocean Observing System for New Zealand". Frontiers in Marine Science. 6. doi:10.3389/fmars.2019.00143. Wikidata Q115337299.
- Oliver Floerl; Inglis, Graeme J.; Hayden, Barbara (2005). "A risk-based predictive tool to prevent accidental introductions of nonindigenous marine species". Environmental Management. 35 (6): 765–778. doi:10.1007/s00267-004-0193-8. PMID 15940401. Wikidata Q33216595.
- Zeldis, John R.; Karen Robinson; Alex Ross; Hayden, Barbara (2004). "First observations of predation by New Zealand Greenshell mussels (Perna canaliculus) on zooplankton". Journal of Experimental Marine Biology and Ecology. 311 (2): 287–299. doi:10.1016/j.jembe.2004.05.019. Wikidata Q115571079.
- Chris M. C. Woods; Oliver Floerl; Hayden, Barbara (2011). "Biofouling on Greenshell™ mussel (Perna canaliculus) farms: a preliminary assessment and potential implications for sustainable aquaculture practices" (PDF). Aquaculture International. 20 (3): 537–557. doi:10.1007/s10499-011-9484-2. Wikidata Q130816722.
- Hayden, Barbara; Chris M. C. Woods (2011). "Effect of water velocity on growth and retention of cultured Greenshell™ mussel spat, Perna canaliculus (Gmelin, 1791)". Aquaculture International. 19 (5): 957–971. doi:10.1007/s10499-010-9413-9. Wikidata Q130761061.
