= Offshore =

Offshore may refer to:

== Science and technology ==
- Offshore (hydrocarbons)
- Offshore construction, construction out at sea
- Offshore drilling, discovery and development of oil and gas resources which lie underwater through drilling a well
- Offshore hosting, server
- Offshore wind power, wind power in a body of water
- Offshore geotechnical engineering
- Offshore aquaculture

== Arts, entertainment, and media ==
- Offshore (novel), a 1979 British novel by Penelope Fitzgerald
- The Offshore, an elite enclave of the chosen, in 3%
- Offshore (album), a 2006 album by Indiana-based post-rock band Early Day Miners
- "Offshore" (song), a 1996 song by British electronic dance music act Chicane

== Finance and law ==
- Offshore bank, relates to the banking industry in offshore centers
- Offshore company
- Offshore financial centre, jurisdictions which transact financial business with non-residents
- Offshore fund, collective investment in offshore centers
- Offshore investment, relates to the wider financial services industry in offshore centers
- Offshore Stock Broker, relates to stock brokers in offshore centers
- Offshore trust, trust arranged in offshore jurisdiction
- Offshoring, active movement of companies to offshore centers

== Other uses ==
- Offshore balancing, a concept used in analysis of international relations
- Offshore powerboat racing, powerboat racing in the open sea
- Offshore, below the intertidal zone

== See also ==
- Tax haven
