= Prosernat =

French engineering company

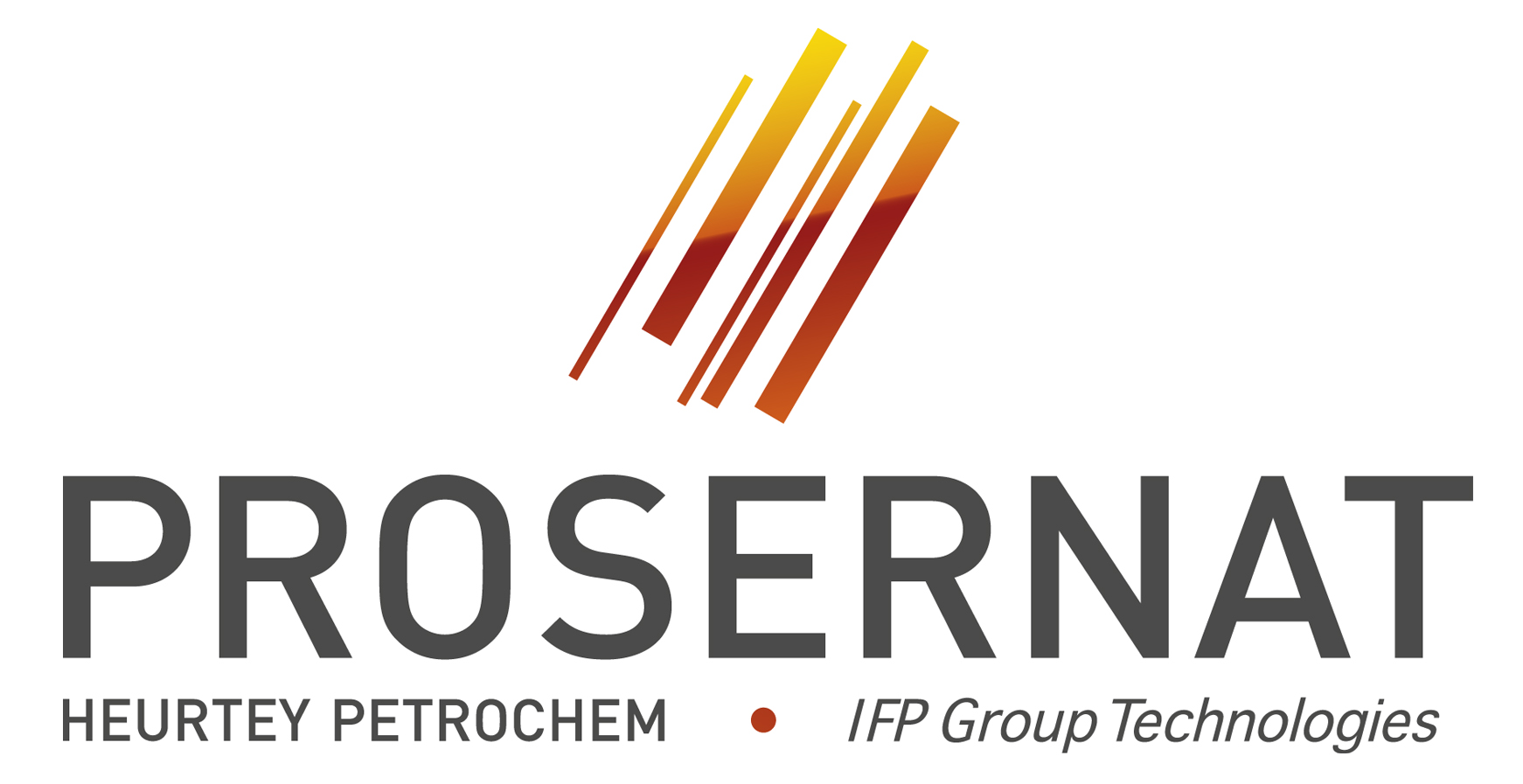
- Type: Engineering
- Industry: Oil and Gas
- Founded: 1979
- Headquarters: 89 Boulevard Franklin Roosevelt,, 92500 Rueil Malmaison,, France
- Key people: Patrick Sarrazin, Axens Executive Vice President, Process Licensing Global Business Unit
- Revenue: 103M€ (2015)
- Number of employees: 140 (2016)
- Parent: Heurtey Petrochem / Axens
- Subsidiaries: Prosernat (M) Sdn Bhd

Prosernat was a French engineering company specializing in process technologies licensing and modular treatment units supply for the oil and gas industry. The company was formed in 1998 as the result of a merger between the companies Proser and NAT. It is headquartered in Rueil Malmaison, France.

Prosernat develops, licenses and supplies technologies and equipment for the oil and gas treatment in the world. With over 450 modular units, both onshore and offshore, the company offers a range of services, including (1) engineering; (2) procurement; (3) fabrication; (4) aftersales and (5) operational solutions.

Prosernat offer is now commercialized under Axens Solutions brand.

== History ==
In 1979, Proser company was founded, directly under Framatome Group. In 1998, Framatome and IsIs approved to merge Proser (Framatome) and NAT (IsIs) into Prosernat with 58 employees in order to create an Oil and Gas processing company. In 2001, Prosernat became a full affiliate of IFP Group Technologies and 10 years later, Heurtey Petrochem announced the acquisition of 60% of Prosernat in April 2011. In 2014, Prosernat became a full affiliate of Heurtey Petrochem.

On January 1, 2019, the French legal entity Prosernat merged into Axens. Prosernat offer, including Modular and Gas Treatment is now marketed by Axens under the brand “Axens Solutions”.

== Applications ==
=== Upstream ===
- MEG Recovery Solutions: The company is the exclusive licensor of MEG Regeneration and Reclaiming proprietary process, created by CCR technologies Ltd
- Gas Sweetening: AdvAmine, SPREX, HySWEET, COSWEET and SweetSulf
- Gas Dehydration: TEG, Ifpexol, Solid Bed Desiccant, Cleanol, Drizo and Progly
- Sulphur Recovery: Adva Sulf, SmartSulf
- Crude Oil / Desalting
- NGL Recovery: Proserpack
- Compression and Offshore / Floating

=== Downstream ===
- Sulphur Recovery
- Crude Oil / Desalting
- CO_{2} Capture: AdvaCap

=== Services ===
- Engineering: a complete scope of engineering services including process licensing, feasibility and conceptual studies, basic engineering design, FEED studies, process selection and cost studies, technical expertise, revamping engineering studies, advanced process control, detailed engineering, modular construction & procurement and construction assistance
- Aftersales: PROSERNAT Advances Customer Services (ProACS) offers a wide range of aftersales services including revamping, troubleshooting, technical assistance and spare parts management

== International network ==
Prosernat is present in 17 countries, including Group offices in Americas (Houston- United States, Rio de Janeiro- Brazil); Asia (Mumbai- India, Beijing- China; Seoul- South Korea); Europe (Buzau- Romania, St Petersburg- Russia) and Middle East (Dubai- United Arab Emirates).
