= Agricultural engineering =

Application of engineering for agricultural purposes

Agricultural engineer
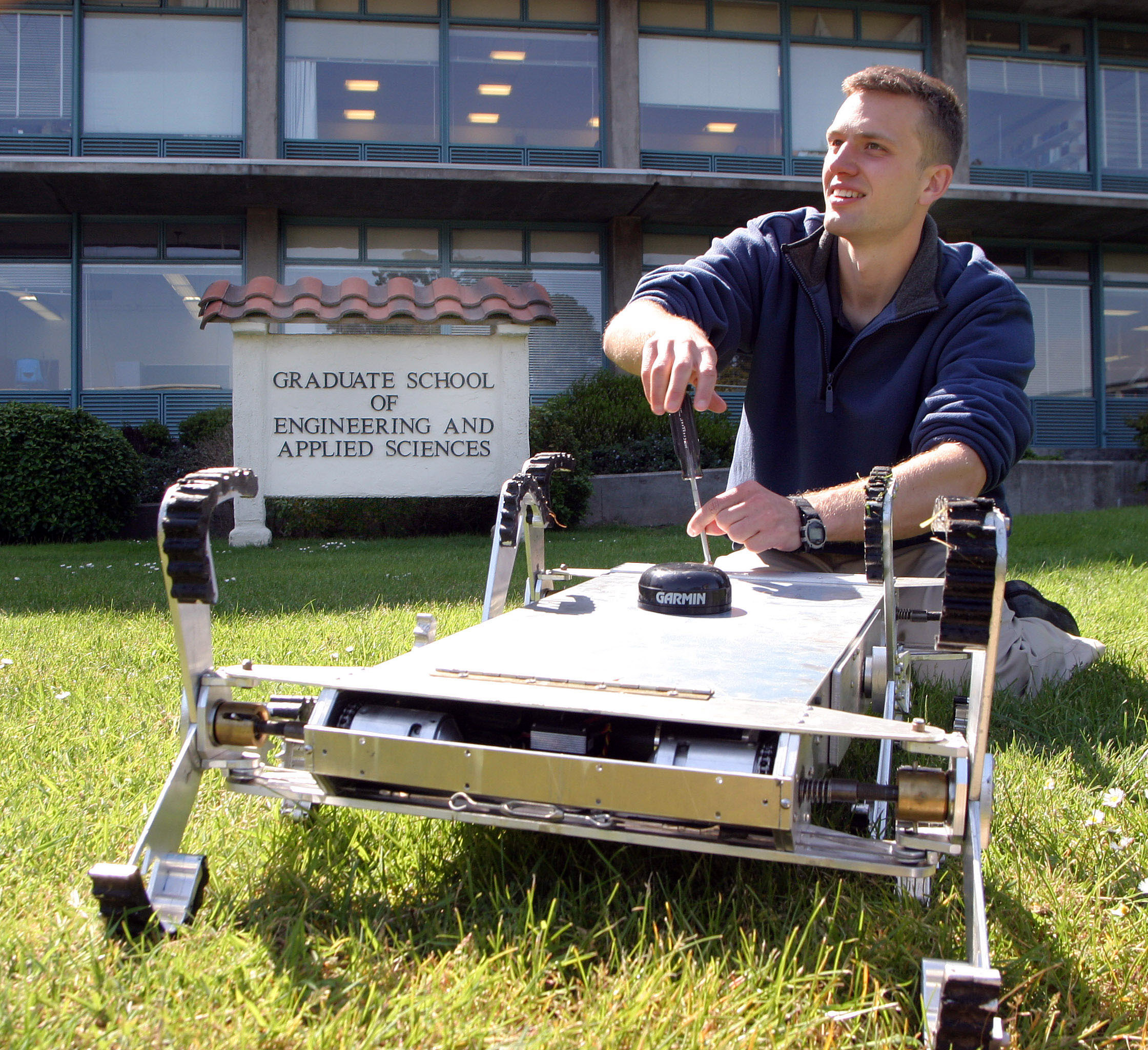
- An agricultural and biosystems engineer fixing an agricultural robot

Occupation
- Names: Agricultural engineer, agricultural and biosystems engineer
- Occupation type: Profession
- Activity sectors: Engineering, agriculture

Description
- Competencies: Engineering, agriculture
- Fields of employment: Engineering, agribusiness, farm
- Related jobs: Agriculturist, farmer, farm worker, engineer

Agricultural engineering, also known as agricultural and biosystems engineering, is the field of study and application of engineering science and designs principles for agriculture purposes, combining the various disciplines of mechanical, civil, electrical, food science, environmental, software, and chemical engineering to improve the efficiency of farms and agribusiness enterprises as well as to ensure sustainability of natural and renewable resources.

An agricultural engineer is an engineer with an agriculture background. Agricultural engineers make the engineering designs and plans in an agricultural project, usually in partnership with an agriculturist who is more proficient in farming and agricultural science.

== History ==
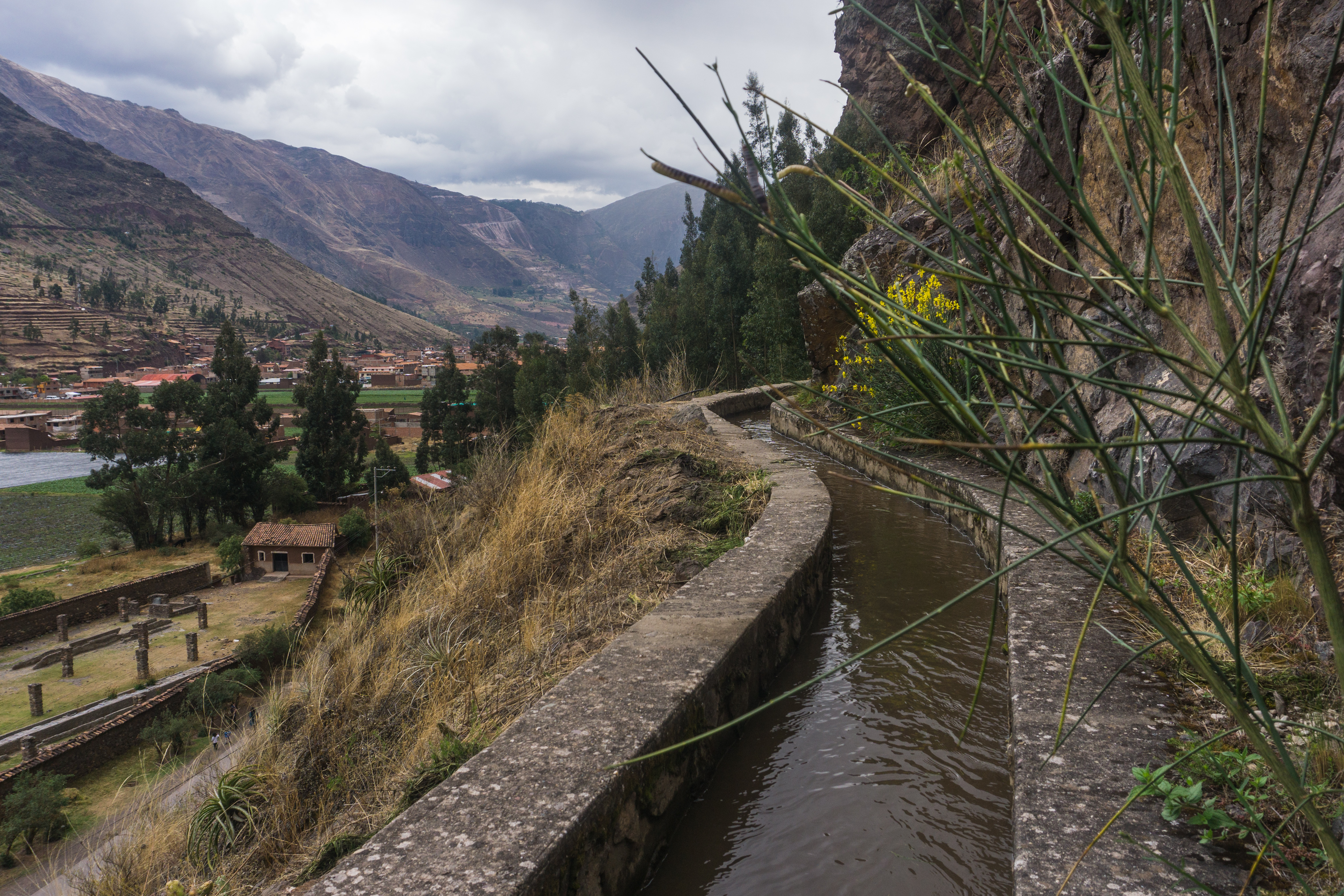
Irrigation canal in Pisac, Peru

The first use of agricultural engineering was the introduction of irrigation in large scale agriculture in the Nile and the Euphrates rivers before 2000 B.C. Large irrigation structures were also present in Baluchistan and India before Christian era. In other parts of Asia, agricultural engineering was heavily present in China. In South America irrigation was practiced in Peru by the Incas and in North America by the Aztecs.

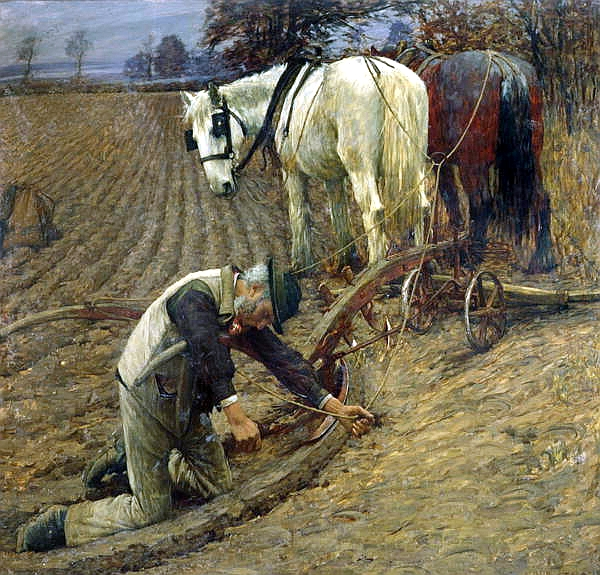
The Last Furrow by Henry Herbert La Thangue

The earliest plough was the ard or scratch-plough.

Settlers practiced irrigation in the vicinity of San Antonio in 1715, the Mormons practiced irrigation in Salt Lake Valley in 1847.

With growing mechanization and steam power in the Industrial Revolution, a new age in agricultural engineering began. Over the course of the Industrial Revolution, mechanical harvesters and planters would replace field hands in most of the food and cash crop industries. Mechanical threshing was introduced in 1761 by John Lloyd, Magnus Strindberg and Dietrich. Beater bar threshing machine was built by Andrew Meikle in 1786. A cast iron plow was first made by Charles Newbold between 1790 and 1796.

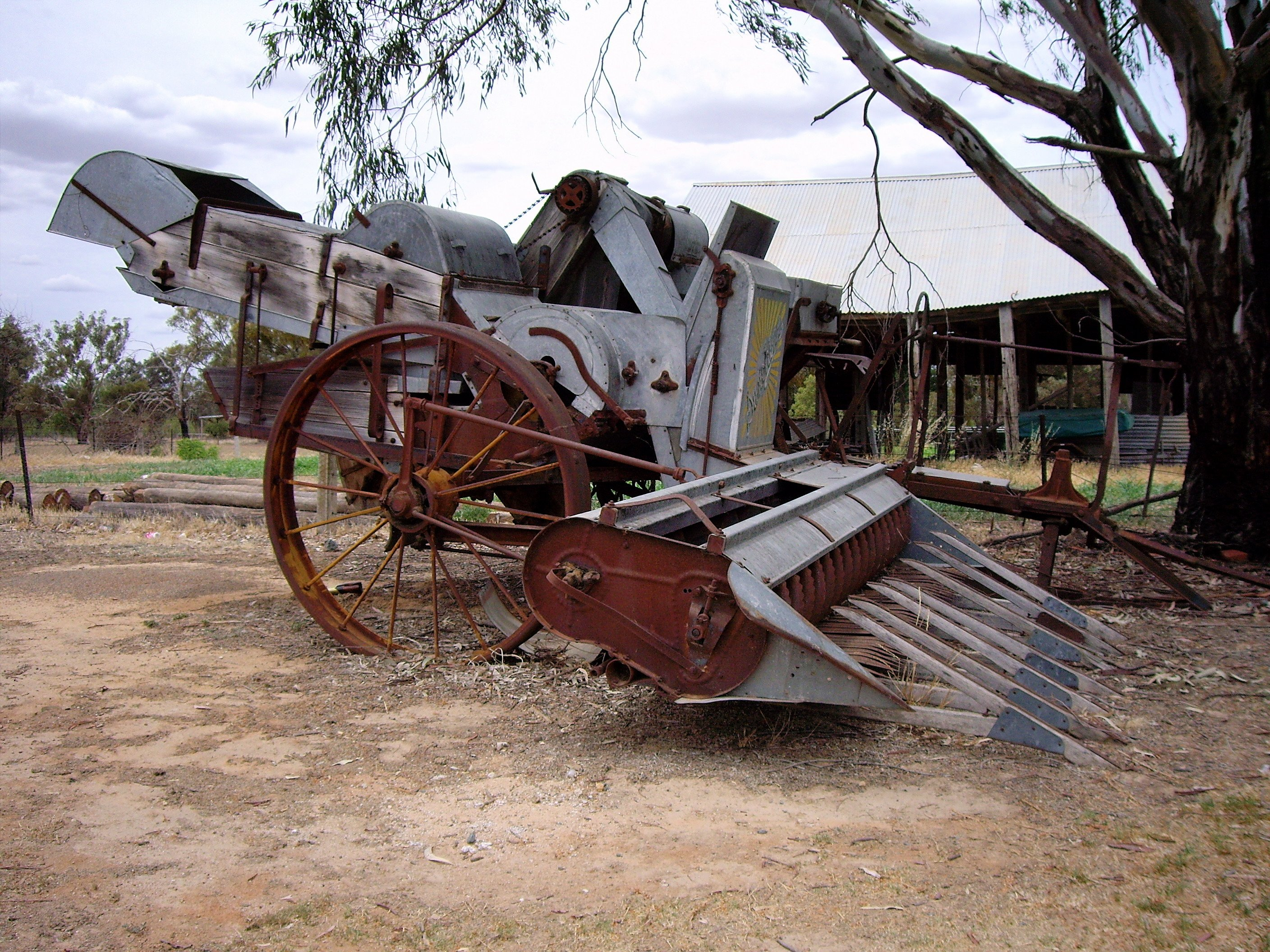
Old Style Sunshine Harvester found in Henty (wine) region of NSW Australia

James Smith constructed a mower in 1811. George Berry used a steam combine harvester in 1886. John Deere made his first steel plow in 1833. The two horse cultivator was first about 1861.

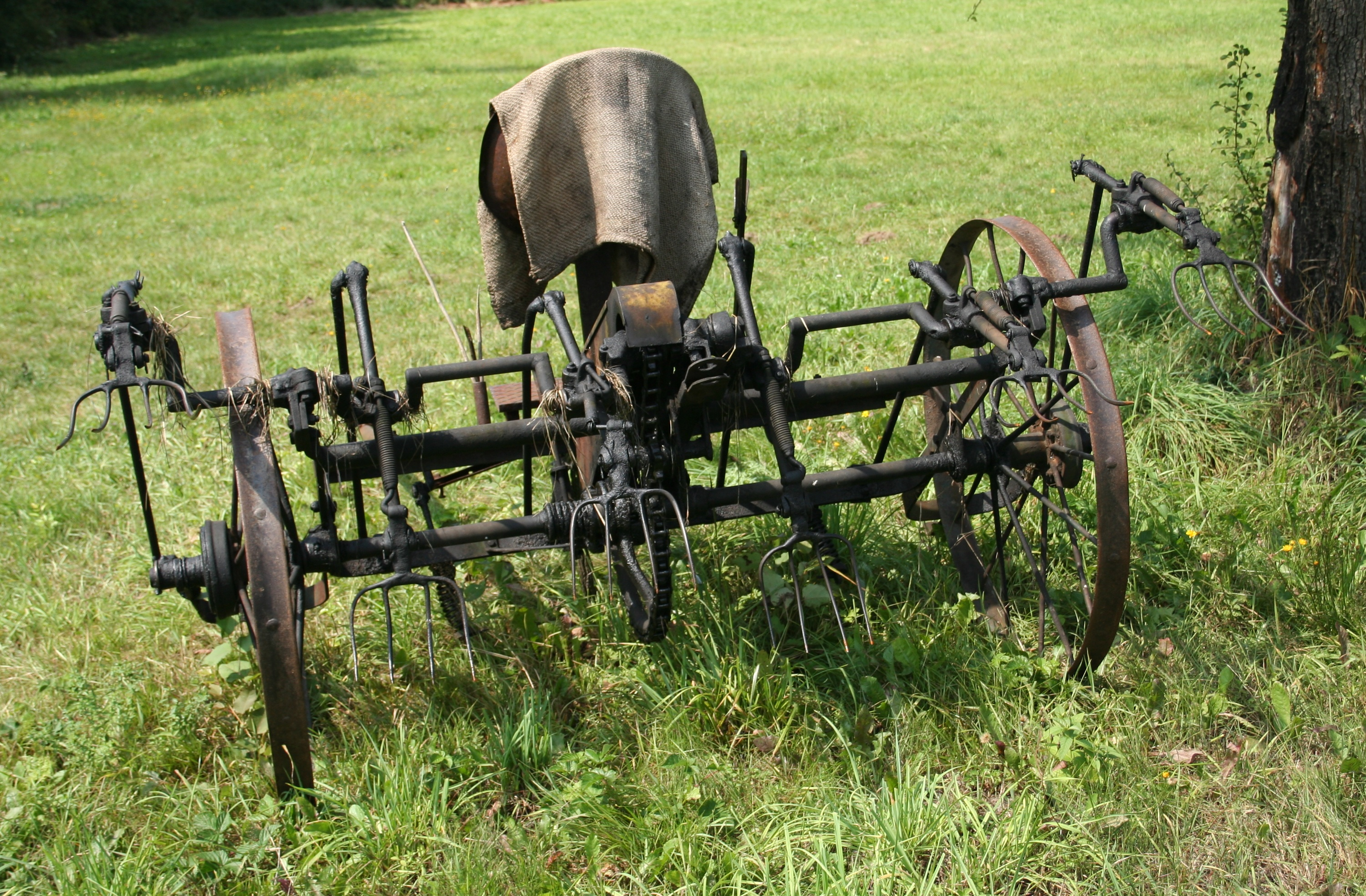
Fork hay tedder

The introduction of these engineering concepts into the field of agriculture allowed for an enormous boost in the productivity of crops, dubbed a "second agricultural revolution" which consisted of:

1. Shift from peasant subsistence-farming to cash-farming for the market
2. Technical changes of crop rotations and livestock improvement
3. Labour being replaced by machinery

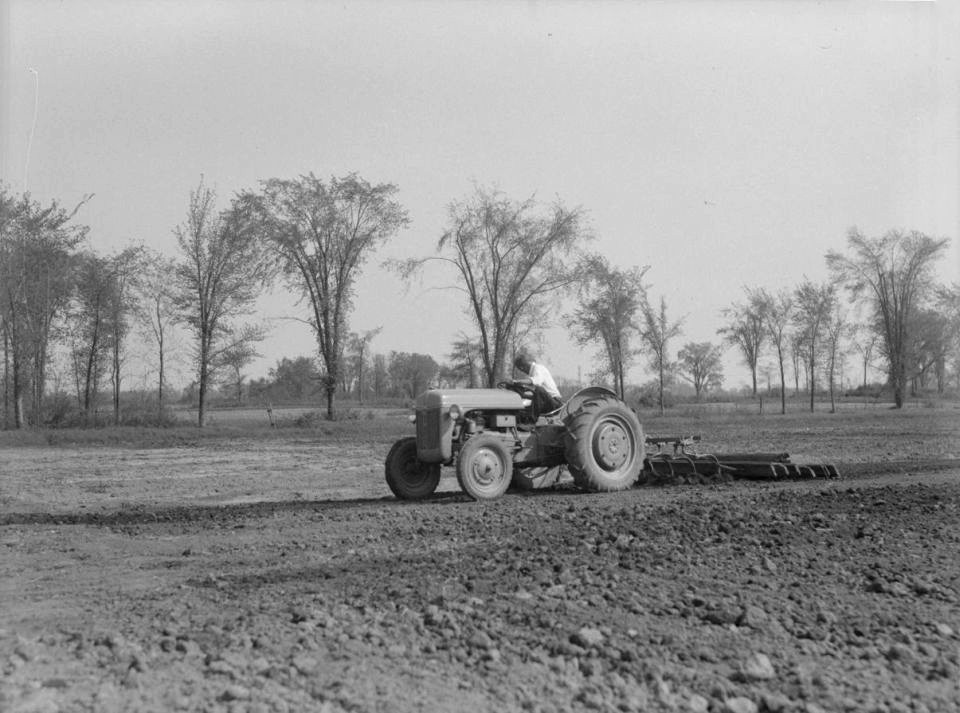
A cultivator pulled by a tractor in Canada in 1943

In the 20th century, with the rise in reliable engines in airplanes, cropdusters were implemented to disperse pesticides. Benjamin Holt built a combine harvester powered by petrol in 1911. Erwin Peucker constructed bulldog tractors 1936. Deutz-Fahr produced the rotary hay tedder in 1961.

In the late 20th century, genetically modified foods (GMOs) were created, giving another large boost to crop yields and resistance to pests.

== Sub-disciplines ==
Agricultural engineering has many sub-disciplines, the most common of which are listed here:

Agricultural machinery

Agricultural structures

Agricultural surveying

Aquaculture

Biomechanics and ergonomics

Forestry engineering

Irrigation

Land development

Pesticides

Precision agriculture

Soil management

== Roles of agricultural engineers ==
Agricultural engineers may perform tasks such as planning, supervising, and managing the building of dairy effluent schemes, irrigation, drainage, flood water control systems, performing environmental impact assessments, agricultural product processing and interpret research results and implement relevant practices. A large percentage of agricultural engineers work in academia or for government agencies. Some are consultants employed by private engineering firms, while others work in industry for manufacturers of agricultural machinery, equipment, processing technology, and structures for housing livestock and storing crops. Agricultural engineers work in production, sales, management, research and development, or applied science.

=== Armenia ===
In 2006, Armenia's agricultural sector accounted for about 20 percent of the GDP. By 2010, it grew to about 25 percent. This was and is higher than in Armenia's neighboring countries of Georgia, Azerbaijan, Turkey, and Iran, in which the contribution of agriculture to the GDP in 2017 was 6.88, 5.63, 6.08, and 9.05 percent, respectively.

=== Philippines ===
In the Philippines, the professional designation is registered agricultural and biosystems engineer'. These engineers are licensed and accredited after successfully passing the Agricultural and Biosystems Engineering Licensure Examination. A prospective agricultural and biosystems engineer must have a four-year Bachelor of Science in Agricultural and Biosystems Engineering.

The practice of agricultural and biosystems engineering also includes the following:

- Consultation, valuation, investigation, and management services on agricultural and biosystems engineering;
- Management or supervision and the preparation of engineering designs, plans, specifications, project studies, and estimates for agricultural and biosystems, aquaculture and fishery, forest product machinery, agricultural and biosystems buildings and structures, farm electrification and energy systems, agricultural and biosystems processing equipment, irrigation, and soils conservation systems and facilities, agricultural and biosystems waste utilization systems and facilities;
- Conducting research and development, training and extension work, and consultancy services on agricultural and biosystems engineering facilities/services, systems, and technologies;
- Testing, evaluation, and inspection of agricultural and biosystems, fishery and forest product machinery, and other related agricultural and biosystems engineering facilities and equipment.
- Management, manufacturing, and marketing of agricultural and biosystems machinery and other related agricultural and biosystems engineering facilities and equipment;
- Teaching agricultural and biosystems engineering subjects in institutions of learning in the Philippines;
- Employment with the government provided such item or position requires the knowledge and expertise of an agricultural and biosystems engineer.

=== United Kingdom ===
In the United Kingdom, the term agricultural engineer is often also used to describe a person who repairs or modifies agricultural equipment.

=== United States ===
The American Society of Agricultural Engineers, now known as the American Society of Agricultural and Biological Engineers (ASABE), was founded in 1907. It is a leading organization in the agricultural engineering field. The ASABE provides safety and regulatory standards for the agricultural industry. These standards and regulations are developed on an international scale for fertilizers, soil conditions, fisheries, biofuels, biogas, feed machinery, tractors, and machinery.

== See also ==
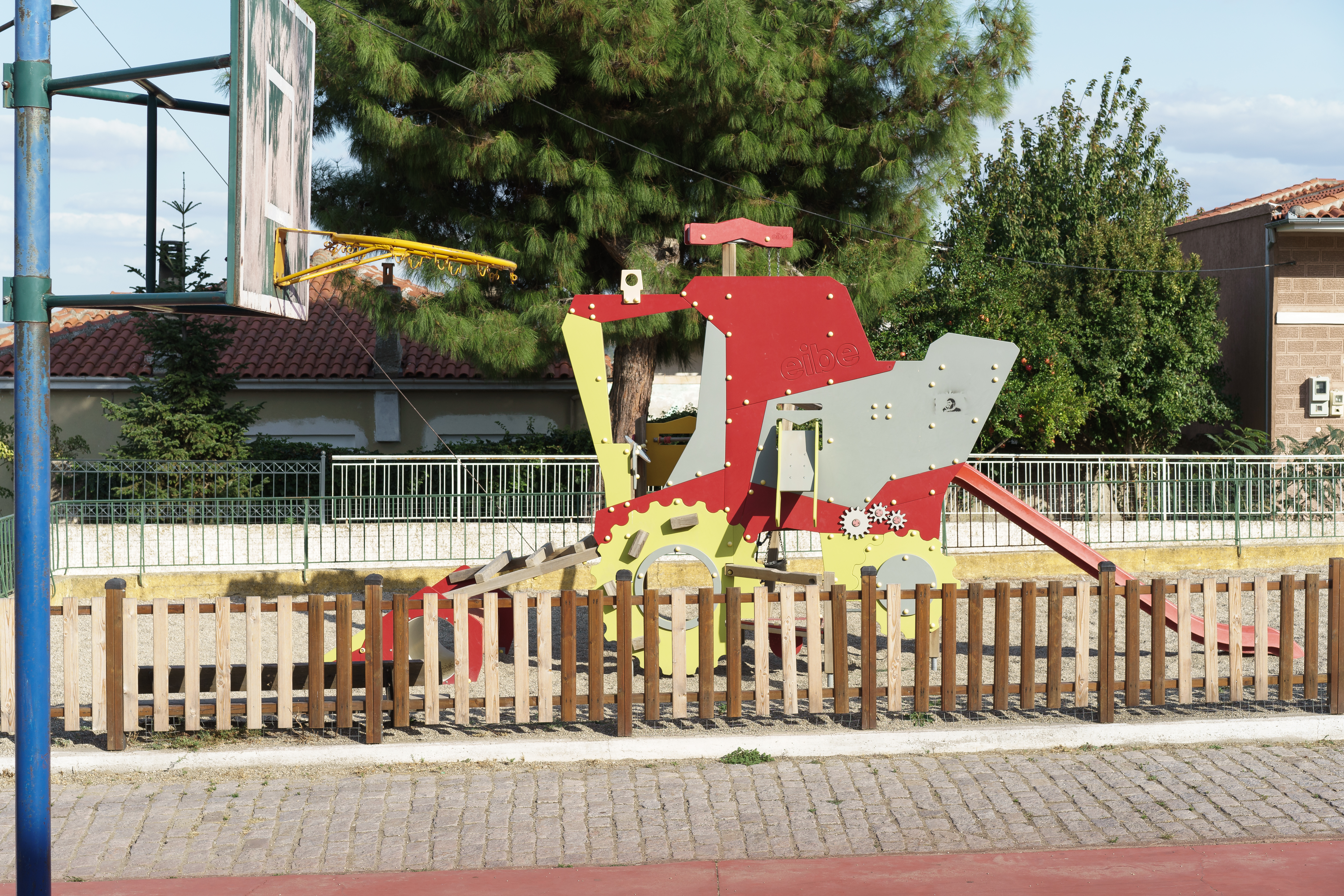
Agricultural machine as play structure

- Agricultural education
- Agricultural science
- Agronomy
- Bioresource engineering
- Biosystems engineering
- Copper alloys in aquaculture
- Industrial agriculture
- Institution of Agricultural Engineers
- List of agricultural journals
- List of agricultural machinery
- Mechanized agriculture
- Water softening
