= Open Agriculture =

- Discipline: Agriculture
- Language: English
- Edited by: Hans R. Herren, Vijay P. Singh

Publication details
- History: 2016-present
- Publisher: Walter de Gruyter
- Frequency: Continuous
- Open access: Yes
- License: CC BY

Standard abbreviations
- ISO 4: Open Agric.

Indexing
- ISSN: 2391-9531
- LCCN: 2016207113
- OCLC no.: 956629429

Links
- Journal homepage

Open Agriculture is a peer-reviewed open access scientific journal covering research on all aspects of agriculture, horticulture, plant science, soil science, food science, and related topics. Occasionally, the journal publishes special issues on a specific topic. It is published by De Gruyter and the editors-in-chief are Hans Rudolf Herren (Millennium Institute) and Vijay P. Singh (Texas A&M University).

== Abstracting and indexing ==
The journals is abstracted and indexed in:

- AGRICOLA
- EBSCO databases
- Emerging Sources Citation Index
- ProQuest databases
- Scopus
