= Tropicultura =

- Discipline: Rural Development
- Language: English
- Edited by: J. Bogaert

Publication details
- History: 1983–present
- Publisher: The University of Liège Library (Belgium)
- Frequency: quarterly
- Open access: Yes
- License: Creative Commons Attribution - Noncommercial Licence 4.0

Standard abbreviations
- ISO 4: Tropicultura

Indexing
- ISSN: 0771-3312 (print); 2295-8010 (web)

Links
- Journal homepage

Tropicultura is a peer-reviewed open access scholarly journal publishing original articles, research and summary notes, overviews of books and essays, announcements and reports on films / audio-visual resources concerning all fields linked to rural development, as well as sustainable management of the environment in overseas countries. It is published on the Portail de Publication de Périodiques Scientifiques (PoPuPS) platform operated by the University of Liège Library. The current editor-in-chief is J. Bogaert.

== Abstracting and indexing ==
The journal is abstracted and indexed in:

- DOAJ
- BIOSIS Previews
- Biological Abstracts
- Scopus
