= Journal of Central European Agriculture =

- Discipline: Agriculture
- Language: English, Bulgarian, Croatian, Czech, Hungarian, Polish, Romanian, Slovak, Slovenian, Serbian

Publication details
- Publisher: International Editorial Board of the Journal of Central European Agriculture
- Frequency: Quarterly
- Open access: yes

Standard abbreviations
- ISO 4: J. Cent. Eur. Agric.

Indexing
- ISSN: 1332-9049
- OCLC no.: 848212051

Links
- Journal homepage; Current issue

The Journal of Central European Agriculture (JCEA) is an Open access peer-reviewed scientific journal founded in 1999 by three faculties from Croatia, Hungary and Slovakia. Today, JCEA is a product of cooperation from nine central European member countries.

Topics covered in JCEA include all areas in field of Agriculture with special attention on landscape management, wildlife management and agro-economy. Journal publishes articles in English language or the member state national language with obligatory title and abstract in English language.
