= Bulgarian Journal of Agricultural Science =

- Discipline: Agriculture, Food science
- Language: English
- Edited by: Maya Ignatova

Publication details
- History: 1995–present
- Publisher: Agricultural Academy of Bulgaria (Bulgaria)
- Frequency: Bimonthly
- Open access: Yes

Standard abbreviations
- ISO 4: Bulg. J. Agric. Sci.

Indexing
- ISSN: 1310-0351 (print); 2534-983X (web)
- OCLC no.: 689359110

Links
- Journal homepage

The Bulgarian Journal of Agricultural Science is an open access peer-reviewed scientific journal published bimonthly by the Agricultural Academy in Bulgaria since 1995. The journal is edited by Maya Ignatova.

== Abstracting and indexing ==
The journal is indexed and abstracted in the following bibliographic databases:

- Academic Search Premier
- CAB Abstracts
- Emerging Sources Citation Index
- Scopus
- Veterinary Science Database
