= Tropical Grasslands (journal) =

- Discipline: Grassland ecology
- Language: English
- Edited by: a . khan

Publication details
- History: 1967-2010
- Publisher: Tropical Grassland Society of Australia (Australia)

Standard abbreviations
- ISO 4: Trop. Grassl.

Indexing
- CODEN: TRGRB4
- ISSN: 0049-4763
- LCCN: 88647836
- OCLC no.: 1767784
- Online archive

Tropical Grasslands was a peer-reviewed scientific journal published by the Tropical Grassland Society of Australia which was formed in 1963. The journal was established in 1967 and was discontinued in 2010 when the Tropical Grassland Society of Australia closed due to declining membership. It covered ecological and agricultural aspects of grasslands. Archived digital copies of articles are available for free online. The founding editor-in-chief was N.H. Shaw and the final editor was Lyle Winks.

In 2012, a new peer-reviewed scientific journal, Tropical Grasslands – Forrajes Tropicales, covering research on tropical pastures and forages was established as an initiative of scientists from Australia and the International Center for Tropical Agriculture. It succeeds the Spanish-only journal Pasturas Tropicales, published from 1979 to 2007, and Tropical Grasslands. Lyle Winks, the former editor of Tropical Grasslands, is the new journal's English editor; Rainer Schultze-Kraft is in charge of submissions in Spanish.
