= Australasian Agribusiness Review =

Australasian Agribusiness Review (ISSN 1442-6951) is a peer-reviewed academic journal in the field of agribusiness. One of the initial co-editors was Bill Schroder.
