= Saltwater aquaponics =

Saltwater aquaponics (also known as marine aquaponics) is a combination of plant cultivation and fish rearing (also called aquaculture), systems with similarities to standard aquaponics, except that it uses saltwater instead of the more commonly used freshwater. In some instances, this may be diluted saltwater. The concept is being researched as a sustainable way to eliminate the stresses that are put on local environments by conventional fish farming practices who expel wastewater into the coastal zones, all while creating complementary crops.

The practice is a careful balance between the ideal salinity conditions for the aquatic species and the maximum allowable salinity levels for the crops that filter the water and create their own yields.

== History of the Practice and Current State of Direction ==
Currently, the majority of saltwater fish farming occurs in the open ocean, which has many harmful effects including disease outbreaks and pollution.

In countries like Japan, saltwater species are much more popular than freshwater fish which has spurred much of the desire for saltwater aquaponics systems.

The mainstream system for fish cultivation has also been mono-aquaculture (only one kind of fish/organism). With this method, oxygen consumption by the cultured fish increases, and the load of carbon dioxide becomes heavier. In addition, nutrients, such as nitrogen and phosphates from feces or remaining fish feed, dissolve in the seawater, making it eutrophic. This causes red tides, fish pathologies, and oxygen deficiency in seawater, resulting in the mass mortality of fish, auto-pollution, etc.

In response poly-eco-aquaculture looks to create symbiosis by establishing seaweeds throughout the year to create an artificial sea forest around the cultured fish cages. The seaweed takes up nutrients, such as nitrogen and phosphate from fish feces and remaining feed and gives off oxygen. The seaweed also inhibits pathogenic bacteria and red tide organisms. Grown seaweeds will then be fed to fish and urchins.

Other organisms which can be produced in these systems include sea cucumber which can be grown in symbiosis with abalone in aquaculture net cages as well. Feces generated by the abalone are fed to sea cucumber. Scallops can also be cultured because they eat organic suspended substances, such as the remaining feed and fish feces.

Environmentally sound poly-eco-aquaculture enables the preservation of aquatic environments to be compatible with that of sustainable aquaculture. With this method, healthy fish can be cultured in purified water while productively recycling seaweed to feed the fish.

== Parts ==
=== Plants ===
Edible halophytes that can be grown in hydroponic systems include New Zealand spinach, common ice plant, common glasswort, barley, rice, and Swiss chard. Algae, seaweed and plankton may be grown as well, possibly in combination.

The relationship between salinity and optimal growth of halotolerant and halophilic plants varies by species. Therefore, it is important to evaluate and optimize cultivation methods by adjusting the salt content of the seawater and diluting wastewater when necessary according to each specific combination of organisms.

==== Common Ice Plant (Suaeda japonica Makino) ====
Common ice plant can gradually acclimate to saltwater. It is possible to farm it in 100% seawater and directly connect its cultivation system to an aquaculture system for a wide range of fish species.

Common ice plant is known to accumulate high levels of heavy metals when grown in soil. This new system enables the farming of safe-to-eat organic ice plant by removing it from this environment.

==== Barley (Hordeum spontaneum) ====
After selecting the most salt tolerant strains, the University of California at Davis was able to grow barley irrigated with pure seawater and obtained half the normal yield per acre.

The experiment was conducted at Bodega Bay, North of San Francisco, in a laboratory on the Pacific Ocean.

==== Rice (PSBRc50) ====
A team led by Liu Shiping, a professor of agriculture at Yangzhou University, created rice varieties that can be grown in salt water. They were able to achieve yields of 6.5 to 9.3 tons per hectare.

== Fish / other aquatic creatures ==
Common creatures in commercial saltwater aquaponics operations include sea fin fish, crustaceans, mollusks, echinoderms, shrimp, prawns, oysters, clam, abalone, flatfishes, and puffer fish. Saltwater fish generally fetch a higher market price than freshwater fish which makes for an economic incentive over traditional aquaponics systems.

It was also found that half pearls could be grown in cultured giant abalone in 5 months after a pearl nucleus was inserted into them. The shells can also be used for mother of pearl work.

== Biofilters ==
=== Phytoplankton, Zooplankton ===
Utilization of aquatic organisms like phytoplankton, zooplankton assist in carbon dioxide and oxygen circulation.

=== Seaweed ===
Seaweed species have the capacity to take in nitrogen and phosphate loads. They also fulfill the role of oxygen producers. However, it is difficult for seaweed to completely take in nitrogen and phosphate loads alone. Even the most efficient species of seaweed requires an area two and a half times that of the fish farm in order to take in the total loads. Just the same, it is considered important to cultivate effective seaweed for the eutrophication of each fish farm and improve the water quality.

== Operation ==
=== Feed Source ===
Utilization of aquatic organisms (e.g., phytoplankton, zooplankton, and fish) are an important part of constructing natural food chains within closed ecological systems.

Construction of a Spirulina to fish food chain opens up the possibility of recirculating aquaculture systems in areas where there may be scarcity or absence of suitable feed resources.

=== Nutrients ===
There are large differences in the concentrations of phosphorus, potassium, and magnesium between freshwater and saltwater aquaponics. Potassium and magnesium are major elements in saltwater. Phosphorus is excreted by fish. Its concentration is relatively low in freshwater conditions but high in saltwater.

== Disease and pest management ==
Although a closed environment has the ability to cultivate large disease outbreaks, it simultaneously reduces predation risks. Outbreaks are also easier to address in a closed environment.

=== Black Spot Disease ===
If calcium, and to a certain extent, magnesium, are lacking, fish may fail to develop a healthy carapace after molting. This can especially lead to "black spot disease," where the animal develops melanized lesions over all of its body, for example, after injury such as scraping against the sides of the rearing facilities.

== Risks ==
Fish farmers' lack of experience with this system can result in massive deaths. Inappropriate disinfection, mistakes in oxygen supply, mismanagement of fish seed, and poor estimation of nitrifying capacity, can force the faculties to shut down. Other problems include the lack of backups (i.e. power and materials) in case of emergencies.

== Current examples ==
Azuma-cho Fisheries

In 2000, Azuma-cho Fisheries Co-operative Association employed seaweed breeding near marine aquaculture farms in an effort to create a safe and sustainable aquaculture recirculating system.

IMT Engineering Inc

From 2003 to 2005, IMT Engineering Inc. conducted aquaponics experiments using the wastewater from shrimp cultures at a facility located in Tsukuba City, Japan. The crops that were tested were water spinach and watercress. The experimental facility was conducted with a 1200-ton grow-out pool.

Mote Aquaculture Park

A sustainable fish farming facility in Sarasota, Florida called Mote Aquaculture Park launched a commercial demonstration project in fall 2014 with the purpose of demonstrating marine aquaponics farming practices. The project raises the saltwater fish species red drum alongside salt-loving halophyte plants, sea purslane and saltwort.. The plants are on a 2-month harvest cycle, and sold via local farmers' markets. The fish production is on a 9–12 months harvest cycle. They are distributed through Florida-based wholesalers.

== See also ==
- Aquaponics
- Crop tolerance to seawater
