= Zemědělská ekonomika =

- Discipline: Agricultural, Economics
- Language: English

Publication details
- History: 1954–present
- Frequency: Monthly

Standard abbreviations
- ISO 4: Zeměd. Ekon.

Indexing
- ISSN: 0139-570X

Links
- Journal homepage

Zemědělská ekonomika (English: Agricultural Economics) is a peer-reviewed academic journal published monthly by the Czech Academy of Agricultural Sciences. It has been published since 1954, using the current title since 1999.
