= Folia Horticulturae =

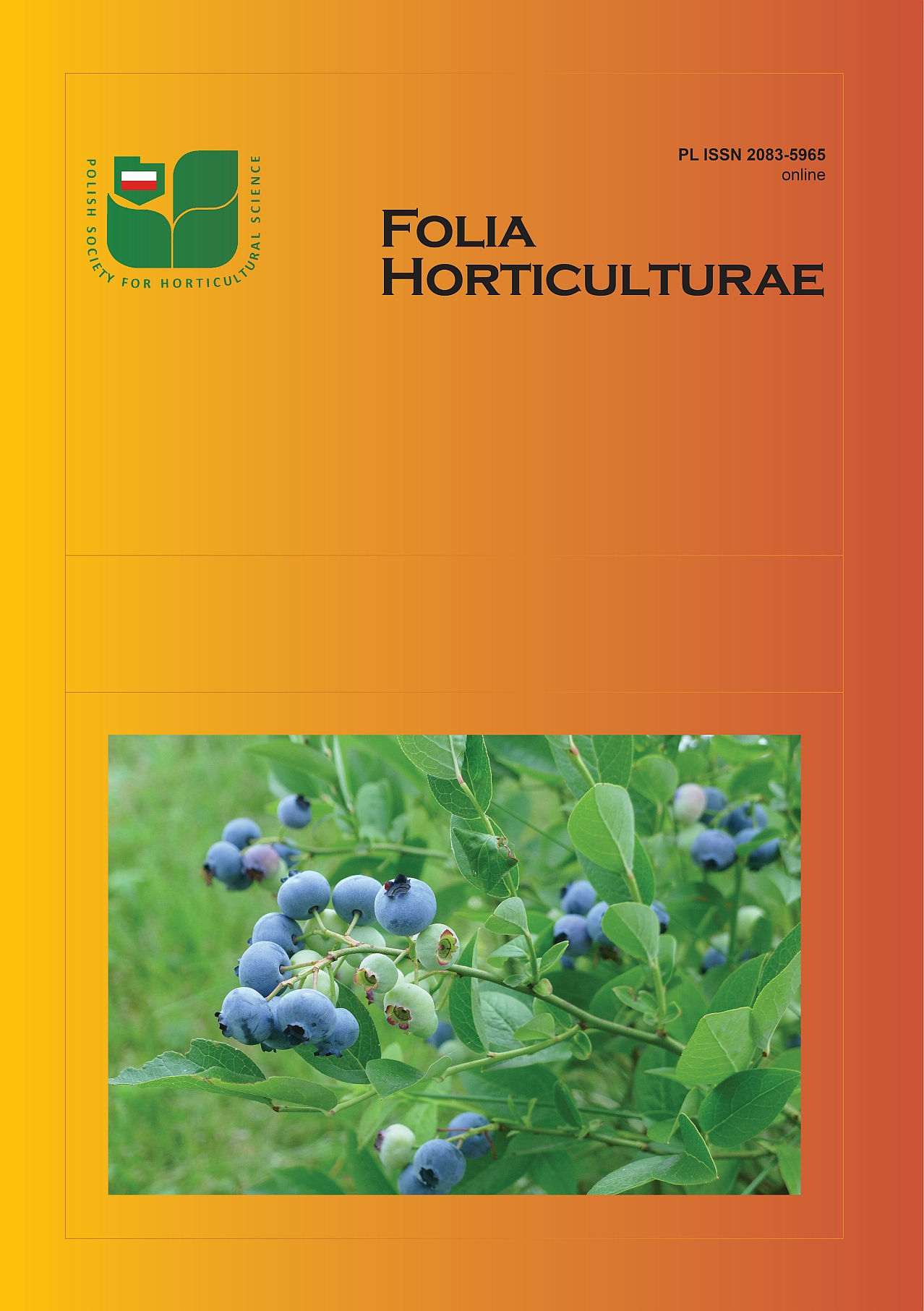
- Discipline: Horticulture
- Language: English
- Edited by: Grzegorz P. Łysiak

Publication details
- History: 1989–present
- Publisher: Polish Society of Horticultural Science
- Frequency: 4/year
- Impact factor: 2.2 (2022)

Standard abbreviations
- ISO 4: Folia Hortic.

Indexing
- ISSN: 0867-1761 (print); 2083-5965 (web)

Links
- Online access

Folia Horticulturae is a quarterly peer-reviewed open access scientific journal of the Polish Society of Horticultural Science publishing original research papers, short communications and review papers from all branches of horticulture. Works must cover the subject of one of the main branches of horticultural crops: fruit production, vegetable production, herbs and medicinal plants, ornamental plants, and plants used in landscape architecture, as well as papers that combine aspects of plant cultivation, plant protection, breeding, seed and nursery, and storage of horticultural commodities.

The journal is abstracted and indexed in AGRICOLA, CABI, and EBSCO databases. According to the Journal Citation Reports, the journal has a 2023 impact factor of 2.2.
