= Fisheries Research =

Peer-reviewed academic journal on fisheries science

- Subject: Fisheries science
- Language: English
- Edited by: G.A. Rose

Publication details
- History: 1982–present
- Publisher: Elsevier
- Open access: Hybrid
- License: CC BY 4.0 or CC BY-NC-ND 4.0
- Impact factor: 1.903 (2014)

Standard abbreviations
- ISO 4: Fish. Res.

Indexing
- ISSN: 0165-7836 (print); 1872-6763 (web)
- LCCN: 83642660

Links
- Journal homepage; Online access

Fisheries Research is a peer-reviewed academic journal on fisheries science published by Elsevier since 1982. The journal is abstracted and indexed in the Science Citation Index, Scopus, Biosis, Academic Search Premier, and PASCAL. According to the Journal Citation Reports, the journal has a 2014 impact factor of 1.903.
