= InfoAg Conference =

Agricultural event in the United States

The InfoAg Conferences are a source for information on technology in crop production, data management, and communication. Sponsored by the Foundation for Agronomic Research (FAR) and the International Plant Nutrition Institute (IPNI), the InfoAg conferences feature a line-up of speakers, interest areas, and demonstrations.

== Previous venues ==
- 1995 - Champaign, IL - Chancellor Hotel, June 27-30, 1995
- 1996 - Champaign, IL - University of Illinois
- 1997 - Champaign, IL - University of Illinois
- 1999 - West Lafayette, IN - Purdue University, August 9-11, 1999
- 2001 - Indianapolis, IN - InfoAg 2001, August 7-9
- 2003 - Indianapolis, IN - InfoAg 2003, July 30-August 1
- 2005 - Springfield, IL - InfoAg 2005, July 19-21
- 2007 - Springfield, IL - InfoAg 2007, July 10-12
- 2009 - Springfield, IL - InfoAg 2009, July 14-16
- 2011 - Springfield, IL - InfoAg 2011, July 12-14
- 2013 - Springfield, IL - InfoAg 2013, July 16-18
- 2014 - St. Louis, MO - InfoAg 2014, July 29-31
- 2015 - St. Louis, MO - InfoAg 2015, July 28-30
- 2016 - St. Louis, MO - InfoAg 2016, August 2-4, 2016
- 2019 - St. Louis, MO - InfoAg 2019, July 22-25, 2019

== Forthcoming venues ==
- 2021 - St. Louis, MO - InfoAg 2021, 27–29 July 2021 (no 2020 conference)

== Regional Conferences ==
In 2005, the InfoAg Conferences began holding regional conferences focused on regional concerns, crops, and speakers.

- Mid-South 2005 - Tunica, MS - InfoAg Mid-South 2005
- Mid-South 2007 - Starkville, MS - InfoAg Mid-South 2007
- Northwest 2007 - Kennewick, WA - InfoAg Northwest 2007
