= Acta Agriculturae Scandinavica B =

- Journal cover page
- Discipline: Soil science, Plant science
- Language: English
- Edited by: Anna Mårtensson

Publication details
- Former name: Acta Agriculturae Scandinavica
- History: 1950–present
- Publisher: Taylor & Francis and the Nordic Association of Agricultural Scientists
- Frequency: 8/year
- Impact factor: 1.694 (2020)

Standard abbreviations
- ISO 4: Acta Agric. Scand. B

Indexing
- CODEN: AASBEV
- ISSN: 0906-4710 (print); 1651-1913 (web)
- LCCN: sf97001064
- OCLC no.: 610456803

Links
- Journal homepage; Online access; Online archive

Acta Agriculturae Scandinavica. Section B. Soil and Plant Science is a peer-reviewed scientific journal published by Taylor & Francis on behalf of the Nordic Association of Agricultural Scientists. It covers environmental sciences, botany, earth sciences, physical geography, ecology, and the soil sciences of relevance to agriculture.

Before the 1992 split into section B (soil and plant science) and section A (animal science), the journal was published by the Royal Swedish Academy of Agriculture and Forestry from 1950 to 1955. It was then published from 1973 to 1991 by the Nordic Association of Agricultural Scientists.

The editor-in-chief is Anna Mårtensson (Swedish University of Agricultural Sciences).

== Abstracting and indexing ==
This journal is abstracted and indexed by:

- Science Citation Index
- Current Contents/Agriculture, Biology & Environmental Sciences
- BIOSIS Previews
- Chemical Abstracts Service
- Current Awareness in Biological Sciences

According to the Journal Citation Reports, the journal has a 2020 impact factor of 1.694.
