= Soil Biology and Biochemistry =

- Cover page of the July 2019 issue
- Discipline: Soil biology
- Language: English
- Edited by: Karl Ritz and Josh Schimel

Publication details
- History: 1969–present
- Publisher: Elsevier (United Kingdom)
- Frequency: Monthly
- Open access: Hybrid and Open Access Support
- Impact factor: 9.8 (2023)

Standard abbreviations
- ISO 4: Soil Biol. Biochem.

Indexing
- ISSN: 0038-0717 (print); 1879-3428 (web)
- OCLC no.: 01716162

Links
- Journal homepage

Soil Biology and Biochemistry is a monthly peer-reviewed scientific journal established in 1969 and published by Elsevier. It focuses on research papers that explain biological processes in soil. The founding editor-in-chief was John Saville Waid, and the current editors-in-chief are Karl Ritz from the University of Nottingham and Josh Schimel from the University of California Santa Barbara, who have been in position since 2020.

The journal covers a broad range of topics within soil biology, including microbial and faunal activities, biogeochemical cycles, and ecosystem processes. It is recognized for its contributions to understanding soil health, fertility, and the role of soil organisms in maintaining ecological balance.

== Abstracting and Indexing ==
Soil Biology and Biochemistry is indexed in several major databases, including Scopus, Web of Science, and PubMed. It has a significant impact factor, which has consistently increased over the years, indicating its relevance and influence in the field of soil science. According to the Journal Citation Reports, the journal had an impact factor of 9.8 in 2023, reflecting its high citation rate.

== Notable research and contributions ==
The journal has published pioneering studies on soil microbial ecology, nutrient cycling, and the impact of environmental changes on soil processes. It serves as a critical resource for researchers, agronomists, and environmental scientists.
