= Aquaculture International =

- Discipline: Agricultural
- Language: English

Publication details
- History: 1993–present
- Publisher: Springer Science+Business Media
- Frequency: Bimonthly

Standard abbreviations
- ISO 4: Aquac. Int.

Indexing
- ISSN: 0967-6120 (print); 1573-143X (web)

Links
- Journal homepage

Aquaculture International is an international bi-monthly scientific journal on the subject of aquaculture and the official journal of the European Aquaculture Society. It is published by Springer. Publication began in 1993. The name is conventionally abbreviated "Aquac Int".

The current editor in chief and main editor, as of March 1, 2020, was Gavin M. Burnell. In 2019, it had an Impact Factor of 1.363.
