= Aquaculture Research =

- Subject: Fisheries science
- Language: English
- Edited by: Ronald W. Hardy, Lindsay Ross, Shi-Yen Shiau, Marc Verdegem

Publication details
- Former names: Aquaculture and Fisheries Management, Fisheries Management
- History: 1970–present
- Publisher: Wiley
- Frequency: Monthly
- Open access: Hybrid
- License: CC BY 4.0, CC BY-NC 4.0, or CC BY-NC-ND 4.0
- Impact factor: 2.184 (2021)

Standard abbreviations
- ISO 4: Aquac. Res.

Indexing
- CODEN: AQREFC
- ISSN: 1355-557X (print); 1365-2109 (web)

Links
- Journal homepage

Aquaculture Research is a peer-reviewed academic journal on fisheries science and aquaculture published by John Wiley & Sons since 1970. The journal is abstracted and indexed in the Science Citation Index, Scopus, AGRICOLA, Biosis, Food Science & Technology Abstracts, Academic Search Premier, and GEOBASE. According to the Journal Citation Reports, the journal has a 2020 impact factor of 2.082, ranking it 24th out of 55 journals in the category "Fisheries". Starting as Fisheries Management in 1970, the journal changed names in 1985 to Aquaculture and Fisheries Management and to Aquaculture Research in 1995.
