= Journal of Experimental Marine Biology and Ecology =

- Discipline: Marine biology, ecology
- Language: English
- Edited by: S.E. Shumway, S. Widdicombe

Publication details
- History: 1967–present
- Publisher: Elsevier
- Frequency: Bimonthly
- Impact factor: 1.796 (2015)

Standard abbreviations
- ISO 4: J. Exp. Mar. Biol. Ecol.

Indexing
- ISSN: 0022-0981
- OCLC no.: 38993932

Links
- Journal homepage; Online access

The Journal of Experimental Marine Biology and Ecology is a peer-reviewed bimonthly journal which publishes work on the biochemistry, physiology, behaviour, and genetics of marine plants and animals in relation to their ecology. According to the Journal Citation Reports, the journal has a 2015 impact factor of 1.796.
