= Seabed gouging by ice =

Outcome of the interaction between drifting ice and the seabed

Iceberg drifting into shallower waters and gouging the seabed as it comes into contact with it.

Drifting sea ice pressure ridges can also gouge the seabed.

Seabed gouging by ice is a process that occurs when floating ice features (typically icebergs and sea ice ridges) drift into shallower areas and their keel comes into contact with the seabed. As they keep drifting, they produce long, narrow furrows most often called gouges, or scours. This phenomenon is common in offshore environments where ice is known to exist. Although it also occurs in rivers and lakes, it appears to be better documented from oceans and sea expanses.

Seabed scours produced via this mechanism should not be confused with strudel scours. These result from spring run-off water flowing onto the surface of a given sea ice expanse, which eventually drains away through cracks, seal breathing holes, etc. The resulting turbulence is strong enough to carve a depression into the seabed. Seabed scouring by ice should also be distinguished from another scouring mechanism: the erosion of the sediments around a structure due to water currents, a well known issue in ocean engineering and river hydraulics – see bridge scour.

== Historical perspective and relevance ==
It appears Charles Darwin speculated in 1855 about the possibility that icebergs could gouge the seabed as they drifted across isobaths. Some discussion on the involvement of sea ice was brought up in the 1920s, but overall this phenomenon remained poorly studied by the scientific community up to the 1970s. At that time, ship-borne sidescan sonar surveys in the Canadian Beaufort Sea began to gather actual evidence of this mechanism. Seabed gouges were subsequently observed further north, in the Canadian Arctic Archipelago, and in the Russian Arctic as well. Throughout that decade, seabed gouging by ice was investigated extensively.

What sparked the sudden interest for this phenomenon was the discovery of oil near Alaska's northern coastlines, and two related factors: 1) the prospect that oilfields could abound in these waters, and 2) a consideration that submarine pipelines would be involved in future production developments, as this appeared to be the most practical approach to bring this resource to the shore. Since then, means of protecting these structures against ice action became an important concern. An oil spill in this environment would be problematic in terms of detection and clean-up.

Scientists in fields of research other than offshore engineering have also addressed seabed gouging. For instance, biologists have linked regions of the seabed reshaped by seabed gouging by ice to the formation of black pools, seabed depressions filled with anoxic high-salinity water which are death traps for small marine organisms. However, much of it appears to have been documented from an offshore engineering perspective, for the purpose of oil exploration.

== Seabed survey for gouges ==
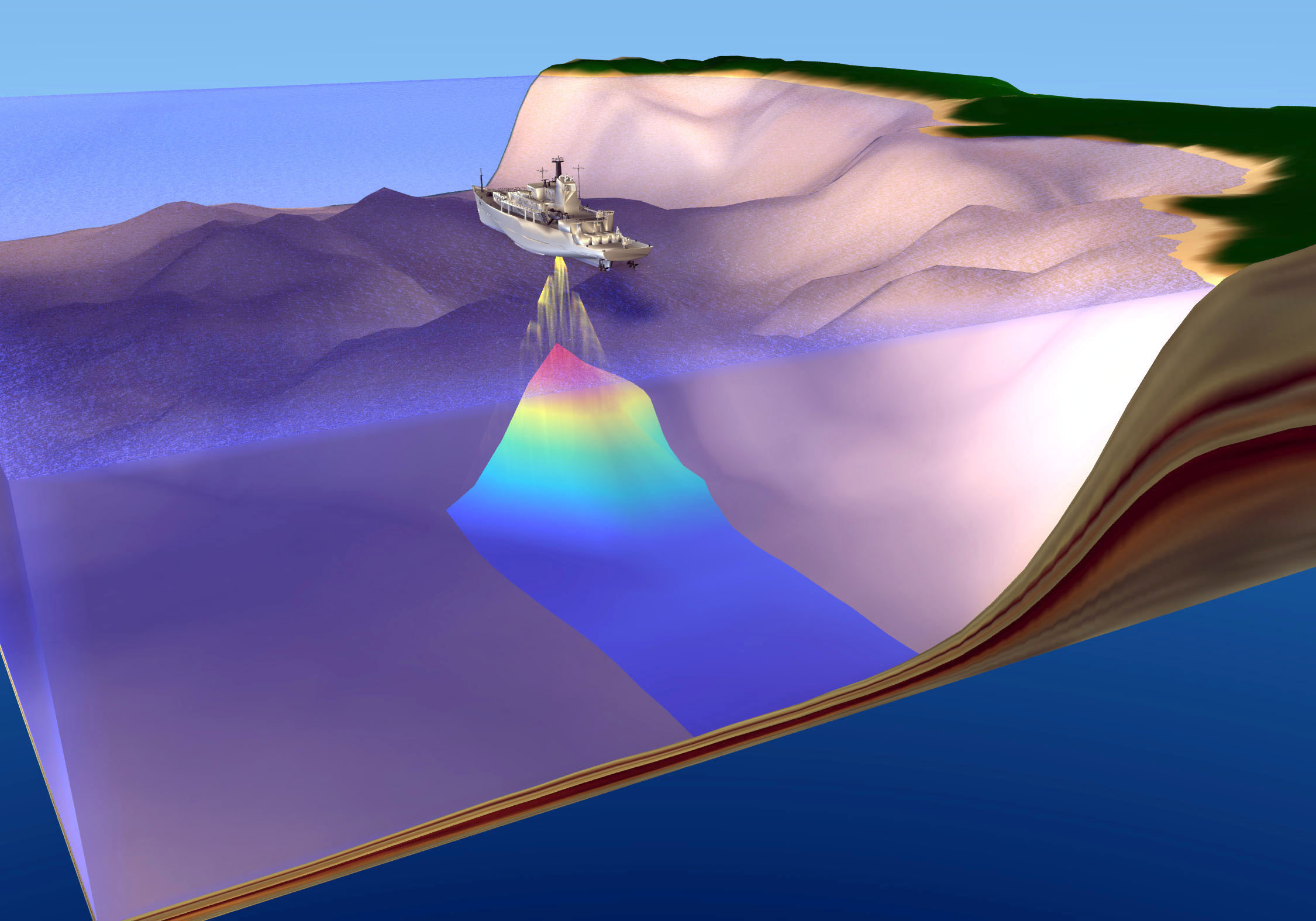
Illustration of an echo sounding operation, here with a multibeam sonar used to map seabed bathymetry.

Seabed gouging by ice is an eminently discreet phenomenon: little sign of it can be observed from above the water surface – the odd evidence includes sea floor sediments incorporated into the ice. Information of interest on these gouges includes: depth, width, length and orientation. Gouging frequency – the number of gouges produced at a given location per unit time – is another important parameter. This kind of information has been gathered by means of seabed mapping with ship-borne instrumentation, typically a fathometer: echo sounding devices such as a side-scan and a multi-beam sonar systems. Repetitive mapping involves repeating these surveys a number of times, at an interval ranging from a few to several years, as a means of estimating gouging frequency.

== Gouge characteristics ==
Seabed gouges produced by drifting ice features can be many kilometers in length. In Northern Canada and Alaska, gouge depths may reach 5 metres (16 ft). Most, however, do not exceed 1 meter (3 feet). Anything deeper than 2 meters is referred to by the offshore engineering community as an extreme event. Gouge widths range from a few meters to a few hundred meters. The maximum water depths at which gouges have been reported range from 450 to 850 metres (1,480 to 2,790 ft), northwest of Svalbard in the Arctic Ocean. These are thought to be remnant traces left by icebergs during the Pleistocene, thousands of years ago, when the sea level was lower than what it is today. In the Beaufort Sea, Northern Canada, a 50 km (30 mi) long gouge was shown to exist, with a maximum depth of 8.5 metres (28 ft) and in water depths ranging from 40 to 50 metres (130 to 160 ft). The gouge is not always straight but varies in orientation. This event is thought to be about 2000 years old. Recent episodes of grounding, gouging and fragmentation of large Antarctic icebergs have been observed to produce powerful hydroacoustic and seismic signals that further illuminate the dynamics of the process.

== The ice features ==
In the offshore environment, the gouging features are made up of two kinds of ice: glacial ice and sea ice.

Anatomy of a gouged seabed, with three zones: Zone 1 is where the soil is removed (to form the gouge), Zone 2 where soil displacement occurs, and Zone 3 where there is none.

=== Glacial ice ===
Physically and mechanically, glacial ice is akin to lake ice, river ice and icicles. The reason is that they all form from freshwater (non saline water). Ice sheets, ice caps and glaciers essentially consist of glacial ice. Since glacial ice spreads sideways and down-slope (as a result of gravity), in some areas this ice reaches the coastline. Where this happens, depending on topography, the ice may break up into pieces that fall in the sea, a mechanism called ice calving, and drift away. Alternatively, ice sheets may spread offshore into extensive floating ice platforms called ice shelves, which can ultimately also calve. The features produced by these calving processes are known as icebergs and may range in size from meter to kilometer scale. The very large ones, referred to as ice islands, are typically tabular in shape. These may be responsible for extreme gouging events.

=== Sea ice ===
Sea ice is the outcome of freezing seawater. It is porous and mechanically weaker than glacial ice. Sea ice dynamics are highly complex. Driven by winds and currents, sea ice may ultimately develop into pressure ridges, a pile-up of ice fragments, or rubble, making up long, linear features. These are a very common source of seabed gouges. Pressure ridges are often enclosed inside expanses of drifting pack ice, such that gouging activity from sea ice ridge keels is closely related with pack ice motion. Stamukhi are also pile-ups of broken sea ice but they are grounded and are therefore relatively stationary. They result from the interaction between fast ice and the drifting pack ice. Stamukhi can penetrate the seabed to a considerable depth, and this also poses a risk to subsea pipelines at shore approaches.

== Gouging dynamics ==
=== Keel reaction ===
Because of the differences in the nature of glacial ice and pressure ridges, gouging events from these two types of ice are also different. In both cases, the ice-soil interface is expected to retain a certain equilibrium angle, called the attack angle, during which the gouging process achieves a steady state. Icebergs may adjust to this angle by rotation. Sea ice ridges may do so through the rearrangement of the rubble at the keel-seabed interface or through keel failure.

=== Seabed reaction ===
Seabed reaction to the gouging process depends on the properties of both the ice and the seabed. Assuming the former is stronger than the latter, and the ice driving force is sufficient, a gouge will form in the seabed. Three zones within the seabed are distinguished on the basis of soil response. Zone 1 is the gouge depth, where the soil has been displaced by the ice feature and remobilized into side berms and front mound ahead of the ice-seabed interface. Zone 2 is where the soil undergoes some displacement. In Zone 3, little or no displacement takes place, but stresses of an elastic nature are transmitted from the zone above.

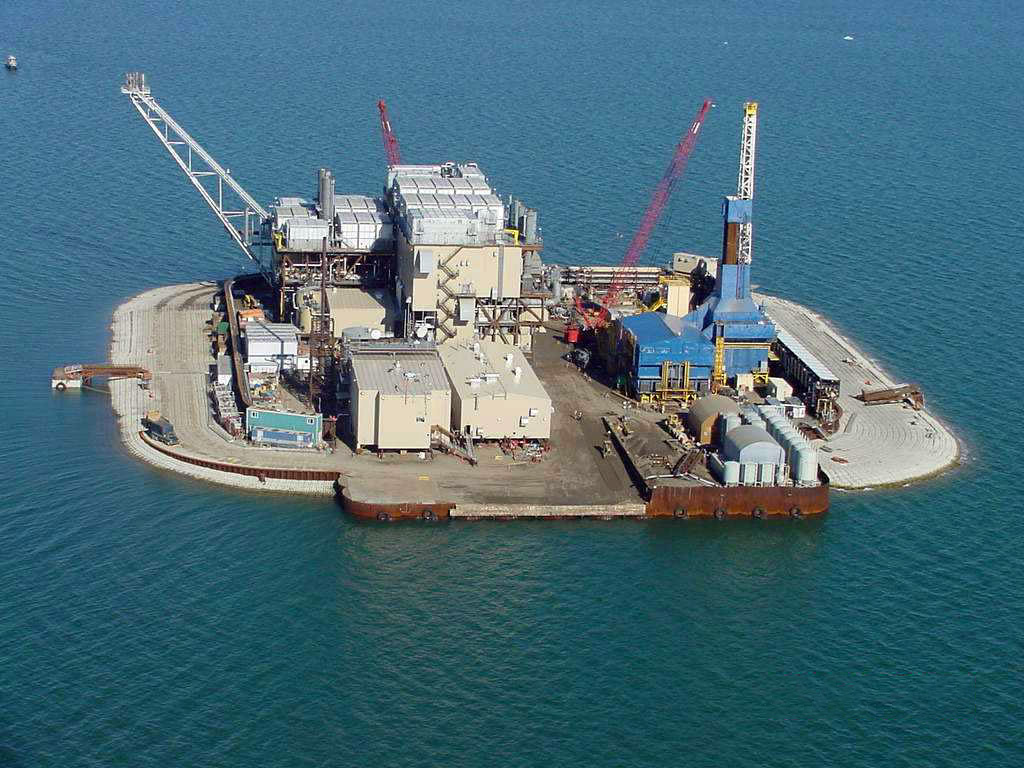
The near shore Northstar Island in the Alaskan Beaufort Sea under open water conditions (summer) is an example of a production facility that relies on a submarine pipeline to carry the resource to land.

== Arctic offshore oil & gas ==
The area north of the Arctic Circle may hold a significant amount of undiscovered oil and gas, up to 13% and 30%, respectively, according to the USGS. This resource probably lies in continental shelves at water depths below 500 metres (1,600 ft), which makes up about one third of that area. Also, more than 400 oil and gas fields had been identified up to 2007, most of them in Northern Russia and on the North Slope of Alaska.

=== A challenge for offshore engineering ===
Access poses a challenge. An offshore production scheme necessarily aims for safe and economical operation throughout the year and the full lifespan of the project. Offshore production developments often consist of installations on the seabed itself, away from sea surface hazards (wind, waves, ice). In shallower waters, the production platform may rest directly on the seabed. Either way, if these installations include a submarine pipeline to deliver this resource to the shoreline, a substantial portion of its length could be exposed to gouging events.

Pipeline buried below the seafloor to avoid direct impact with a seabed gouging ice feature.

=== Protecting submarine pipelines from gouging events ===
According to recent reviews on the subject, adequate protection against gouging activity may be achieved through pipeline burial. Placing the pipeline in Zone 3 would be the safest option, but the costs for this option are deemed prohibitive. Instead, current design philosophy envisages pipe location within Zone 2, which is still below the gouge depth, but where the soil is expected to move as a result of a gouging event above it. This implies that the pipeline must undergo a certain amount of bending and consequent deformation, or strain, of the pipeline wall. For the currently operating North Star production site, “[t]he minimum pipeline depth of cover (original undisturbed seabed to top of pipe) to resist ice keel loads was calculated based on limit state design procedures for pipe bending”. For that particular site, “[p]redicted seabed soil displacements beneath the maximum ice keel gouge depth (3.5 ft) yielded a 7-ft minimum depth of cover for pipe bending strains up to 1.4%”.

This design philosophy must contend with at least three sources of uncertainty:

- The maximum expected gouge depth: Based on the past gouging regime (gouge depth distribution and gouging frequency, especially), one must rely on probability analyses to estimate the likely maximum gouge depth at the planned pipeline deployment site during its full operational lifespan (e.g. 20–40 years). This type of analysis is not unusual in civil engineering – textbooks are written on this subject. But changing climate patterns are an added source of uncertainty, since it is uncertain how climate change will affect future gouging regimes.
- Subgouge deformation: Seabed gouging by ice is a relatively complex phenomenon, depending on a number of parameters (keel dimensions and properties, soil response, etc.). Even if the maximum gouge depth can be ascertained, it is difficult to assess the amount of soil displacement below it, a parameter considered when establishing what a safe pipeline burial depth should be.
- Pipeline strain: Another source of uncertainty is the amount of strain that the pipeline is likely to see at a given depth below the gouge.

=== Environmental issues ===
Oil and gas developments in Arctic waters must address environmental concerns through proper contingency plans. Parts of the Arctic are covered with ice most of the year. During the winter months, darkness prevails. If an oil spill occurs, it may go undetected for several months. Assuming this spill is located, clean-up procedures are likely to be impeded by ice cover. Furthermore, these are remote locations, such that logistical issues would come into play. Arctic ecosystems are sensitive – a timely response is required to mitigate the consequences of an oil spill.

== See also ==
- Drift ice
- Iceberg
- Offshore geotechnical engineering
- Submarine pipeline
- Pressure ridge (ice)
- Stamukha
- Strudel (ice)
- Bloop

== Bibliography ==
- Abdalla B., Jukes P., Eltaher A., Duron B. (2008) The technical challenges of designing oil and gas pipelines in the Arctic, OCEANS 2008 IEEE Proceedings, Quebec City, Canada, pp. 1–11.
- Annandale G.W. (2006) Scour Technology: Mechanics and Engineering Practice, McGraw-Hill, New York, 420 p.
- Barrette, P (2011). "Offshore pipeline protection against seabed gouging by ice: An overview". Cold Regions Science and Technology. 69 (1): 3–20. Bibcode:2011CRST...69....3B. doi:10.1016/j.coldregions.2011.06.007.
- Been K., Sancio R.B., Ahrabian D., Deltares W.V.K., Croasdale K., Palmer A. (2008) Subscour displacement in clays from physical tests, Proceedings of the 5th International Pipeline Conference (IPC), American Society of Mechanical Engineers (ASME), Calgary, Canada.
- Blasco S.M., Shearer J.M., Myers R. (1998) Seabed scouring by sea-ice: scouring process and impact rates: Canadian Beaufort Shelf. Proceedings of the 1st Ice Scour and Arctic Marine Pipelines Workshop, 13th International Symposium on Okhotsk Sea and Sea Ice, Mombetsu, Hokkaido, pp. 53–58.
- Cardenas, I.C.; et al. (2022). "Marine geohazards exposed: Uncertainties involved". Marine Georesources and Geotechnology. 41 (6): 1–31. doi:10.1080/1064119X.2022.2078252. hdl:11250/3058338. S2CID 249161443.
- Clark J.I., Chari T.R., Landva J., Woodworth-Lynas C.M.T. (1987) Pipeline route selection in an iceberg-scoured seabed, Proceedings of the 40th Canadian Geotechnical Conference. The Canadian Geotechnical Society (CGS), Regina, pp. 131–138.
- Comiso, J.C. (2002). "A rapidly declining perennial sea ice cover in the Arctic". Geophysical Research Letters. 29 (20): 17-1 – 17-4. Bibcode:2002GeoRL..29.1956C. doi:10.1029/2002gl015650.
- Croasdale, K., Comfort, G., Been, K. (2005) Investigation of ice limits to ice gouging, Proceedings of the 18th International Conference on Port and Ocean Engineering under Arctic Conditions (POAC), Potsdam, pp. 23–32.
- DF DICKINS & Associates Ltd. (2000) Detection and Tracking of Oil Under Ice, Mineral Management Services (MMS). Herndon.
- Gautier, D.L.; Bird, K.J.; Charpentier, R.R.; Grantz, A.; Houseknecht David, W.; Klett, T.R.; Moore, T.E.; Pitman, J.K.; Schenk, C.J.; Schuenemeyer, J.H.; Sørensen, K.; Tennyson, M.E.; Valin, Z.C.; Wandrey, C.J. (2009). "Assessment of undiscovered oil and gas in the Arctic". Science. 324 (5931): 1175–1179. Bibcode:2009Sci...324.1175G. doi:10.1126/science.1169467. PMID 19478178. S2CID 206517941.
- Grass J.D. (1984) Ice scour and ice ridging studies in Lake Erie. Proceedings of the 7th International Symposium on Ice. Association of Hydraulic Engineering and Research (IAHR), Hamburg, pp. 221–236.
- Haas C. (2003) Dynamic versus thermodynamics: The sea ice thickness distribution. In : Thomas, D. N. & Dieckmann, G. S. (eds.), Sea ice - An Introduction to its Physics, Chemistry, Biology and Geology, Blackwell Science, Malden, MA (USA), pp. 82–111.
- Héquette, A.; Desrosiers, M.; Barnes, P.W. (1995). "Sea ice scouring on the inner shelf of the southeastern Canadian Beaufort Sea". Marine Geology. 128 (3–4): 201–219. Bibcode:1995MGeol.128..201H. doi:10.1016/0025-3227(95)00095-g.
- Hobbs, P.V. (1974) Ice Physics, Oxford University Press, N.Y., 864 p.
- Jordaan, I.J. (2005) Decisions under Uncertainty: Probabilistic Analysis for Engineering Decisions, Cambridge University Press, 672 p.
- King, T (2011). "Protection of pipelines from ice gouging". Journal of Pipeline Engineering. 10 (2): 115–120. Archived from the original on 2011-10-12.
- Kubat I., Gorman R., Collins A., Timco G. (2006) Climate change impact on northern shipping regulations, Proceedings of the 7th International Conference on Ships and Marine Structures in Cold Regions (ICETECH), pp. 1–8.
- Kvitek R.G., Conlan K.E., Iampietro P.J. (1998) Black pools of death hypoxic, brine-filled ice gouge depressions, https://www.int-res.com/articles/meps/162/m162p001.pdf](PDF, Marine Ecology Progress Series.
- Lanan G. A., Ennis J. O. (2001) Northstar offshore Arctic pipeline design and construction, Proceedings of the 33rd Offshore Technology Conference (OTC), Houston, pp. 621-628.
- Lanan G. A., Cowin T. G., Johnston D. K. (2011) Alaskan Beaufort Sea Pipeline Design, Installation and Operation, Proceedings of the 43rd Offshore Technology Conference (OTC) , Houston.
- Leidersdorf, C.B., Hearon, G.E., Hollar, R.C., Gadd, P.E., Sullivan, T.C. (2001) Ice gouge and strudel scour data for the Northstar pipelines, Proceedings of the 16th International Conference on Port and Ocean Engineering under Arctic Conditions (POAC), Ottawa, pp. 145-154.
- Løset, S., Shkhinek, K.N., Gudmestad, O.T. and Høyland, K.V. (2006) Actions from Ice on Arctic Offshore and Coastal Structures. Krasnodar, St. Petersburg, 271 pp.
- Martin, S.; Drucker, R.; Aster, R.; Davey, F.; Okal, E.; Scambos, T.; MacAyeal, D. (2010). "Kinematic and seismic analysis of giant tabular iceberg breakup at Cape Adare, Antarctica". J. Geophys. Res. 115 (B6): B06311. Bibcode:2010JGRB..115.6311M. doi:10.1029/2009JB006700.
- McHale J.E., Dickins D.F., Glover N.W. (2000) Oil spill response in ice infested waters, Proceedings of the 2nd Ice Scour and Arctic Marine Pipelines Workshop, 15th International Symposium on Okhotsk Sea and Sea Ice (Mombetsu, Hokkaido), pp. 15-51.
- Mørk, K (2007). "The challenges facing Arctic pipelines — design principles for extreme conditions". Offshore. 67: 9.
- Nobahar, A.; Kenny, S.; Phillips, R. (2007). "Buried pipelines subject to subgouge deformations". International Journal of Geomechanics. 7 (3): 206–216. doi:10.1061/(ASCE)1532-3641(2007)7:3(206).
- Noble P.G., Comfort G. (1982) Damage to an underwater pipeline by ice ridges, in: Frederking, R.M.W., Pilkington, G.R. (Eds.), Proceedings of Workshop on Sea Ice Ridging and Pile-up, Snow and Ice Subcommittee, Associate Committee on Geotechnical Research, National Research Council Canada, Technical Memorandum No.134, pp. 248–284.
- Oickle, E.J.; Blasco, S.M.; Shearer, J.M. (2006). "Extreme ice-scouring processes on the Canadian Beaufort Shelf caused by sea-ice pressure ridge keels". Atlantic Geology. 42 (1): 104.
- Palmer A.C., Konuk I., Comfort G. and Been K. (1990) Ice gouging and the safety of marine pipelines, Proceedings of the 22nd Offshore Technology Conference (OTC), Houston, pp. 235-244.
- Palmer, A (1997). "Geotechnical evidence of ice scour as a guide to pipeline burial depth". Canadian Geotechnical Journal. 34 (6): 1002–1003. Bibcode:1997CaGJ...34.1002P. doi:10.1139/t97-050.
- Palmer, A.C., Been, K. (2011) Pipeline geohazards for Arctic conditions. In: W.O. McCarron (Editor), Deepwater Foundations and Pipeline Geomechanics. J. Ross Publishing, Fort Lauderdale, Florida, pp. 171-188.
- Palmer, A.C., Tung, C.Y. (2012) Reducing the cost of protecting Arctic marine pipelines against ice gouging, Proceedings of the 22nd International Offshore and Polar Engineering Conference (ISOPE), Rhodes, Greece, pp. 1300-1303.
- Pilkington, G.R., Marcellus, R.W. (1981) Methods of determining pipeline trench depths in the Canadian Beaufort Sea, Proceedings of the 6th International Conference on Port and Ocean Engineering under Arctic Conditions (POAC), Quebec City, pp. 674-687.
- Sonnichsen G.V., King T, Jordaan I., Li C. (2005) Probabilistic analysis of iceberg scouring frequency based on repetitive seabed mapping, offshore Newfoundland and Labrador, Proceedings of the 18th International Conference on Port and Ocean Engineering under Arctic Conditions (POAC), Potsdam, N.Y., pp. 85-94.
- Sonnichsen G., King T. (2011) 2004 Grand Banks iceberg scour survey, Proceedings of the 21st International Conference on Port and Ocean Engineering under Arctic Conditions (POAC), Montreal, pp. 1473-1482.
- Timco, G., Davies, M. (1995) Laboratory Tests of Oil Fate in Cold Water Ice and Waves CHC-NRC Technical Report. Ottawa, Canada.
- Wadhams P. (2000) Ice in the Ocean, Gordon and Breach Science Publishers, 351 p.
- Weeks W.F. (2010) On Sea Ice, University of Alaska Press, 664 p.
- Woodworth-Lynas, C.M.T.; Simms, A.; Rendell, C.M. (1985). "Iceberg scouring and grounding on the Labrador Continental Shelf". Cold Regions Science and Technology. 10: 163–186. doi:10.1016/0165-232x(85)90028-x.
- Woodworth-Lynas C., Nixon D., Phillips R., Palmer A. (1996) Subgouge deformations and the security of Arctic marine pipelines, Proceedings of the 28th Offshore Technology Conference (OTC), Houston, pp. 657–664.
