= Strudel (ice) =

Vertical hole in sea ice

Arbitrary example of a strudel pattern on sea ice

When a floating ice sheet (top diagram) is flooded (bottom diagram), a strudel may form, leading to jet-like water drainage and associated scour in the seabed (P: pressure).

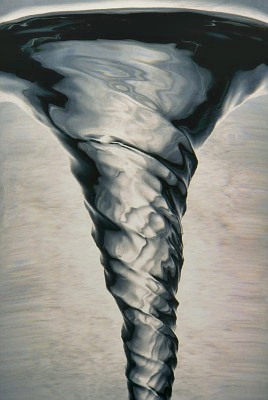
Whirlpool – a vortex analogous to that created by water draining above a strudel

A strudel /ˈstruːdəl/ (plural: strudel) is a vertical hole in sea ice through which downward jet-like, buoyancy-driven drainage of flood water is thought to occur. This feature is less than a few tens of meters in size and typically occurs within 30 km from a river mouth, in the sea ice expanse that is fastened to the coastline (known as fast ice). Once the water that flooded the ice has completely drained off the ice surface, strudel become recognizable by a radial pattern of feeder channels that lead to the hole. They are elongated and irregularly spaced, with the larger ones up to several kilometers apart. Their distribution tends to be controlled by weak areas in the ice – in places, they line up along fractures or refrozen extensional cracks. The ice sheet where they occur may be 2 m in thickness, at water depths (below the ice) in the order of a few meters.

The term strudel is German, and designates a whirlpool, in reference to the water vortex that forms above these features during drainage. It has been suggested that this vortex could present a hazard for investigators wishing to study this phenomenon in the field, and that this would explain, at least partly, why little is known about strudel.

== Formation ==
The formation of strudel is related to the break up of a frozen river during the melting season, where this river runs into a sea ice expanse. At that time, fresh water flows onto the fast ice with a progression rate of about 2–3 m/s, extending up to a few tens of kilometers away from the river mouth. Water depths above the ice surface may be up to a few meters. A strudel forms as a result of water carving its way through the ice sheet. Drainage is initiated through small openings or cracks in the ice resulting from the weight of the freshwater. Some are reportedly enlarged seal-breathing holes. Within a few days, the water drains off the ice. Drainage is driven by the buoyancy of the ice, not by the density difference between freshwater and sea water. The pressure difference responsible for that flow is a function of the ice thickness and the difference in unit weight between the ice and the water.

== Strudel scours ==
Water gushing downward through strudel produces scour depressions in the seabed. This occurs at shallow water levels, within the two-meter bathymetry contour, and up to 8 meters. The depth of these depressions may reach 6 meters or more. This depends on a number of factors: seabed properties, water depth, flow velocity, flow duration and size and shape of the orifice. The width of individual strudel scours are generally in the order of 10–20 meters. An excavation rate of 2.5 km^{−2}y^{−1} has been reported, as well as complete back filling by sediments within 2–3 years. Such rapid filling rates imply that most strudel scours are recent events. Strudel scours present risks to submarine pipelines if water action removes the soil from below a pipe segment such that it becomes a free span. The consequences include: vortex-induced oscillation, lateral buckling and overstress due to self-weight. Moreover, the presence of a pipeline may conceivably promote the generation of strudel because of the heat generated by this structure, which may thin and thus weaken the ice above it.

A distinction is made between strudel scours and ice scours. The former is the result of water action, as is the case for other types of scours (bridge and tidal scours); the latter, also called gouges, are produced by drifting ice and are most often linear features.

== See also ==
- Bridge scour
- Fast ice
- Seabed gouging by ice
- Sea ice
- Submarine pipeline
- Tidal scour
