= Hydrodynamic scour =

Removal of sediment near an obstruction by swiftly moving water

Mechanism of formation

Hydrodynamic scour is the removal of substrate (gravel, sand, silt, clay, sediment, etc.) from around the base of obstructions to the flow in the sea, rivers, and canals. Scour, caused by fast-flowing water, can carve out scour holes, compromising the integrity of a structure. It is an interaction between the hydrodynamics and the geotechnical properties of the substrate. Bridge scour is a notable cause of bridge failure and a problem with most marine structures supported by the seabed in areas of significant tidal and ocean current. It can also affect biological ecosystems and heritage assets.

== Mechanism ==
Any obstruction within flowing water produces changes in velocity within the water column. The flow changes that occur in the vicinity of the substrate may cause differential movement in the bed materials near the obstruction. The magnitude of these changes varies with stream velocity, feature shape, and substrate character. Generally the stream bed is deepened at the upstream end of the obstruction, and the material removed from the substrate is usually deposited in the sheltered areas behind or adjacent to the obstruction where the local velocity is sufficiently reduced. In conditions of high stream velocities, mobile bed materials, and poorly streamlined structures, scour depths can be quite great.

== See also ==
- Bridge scour
- Kolk (vortex)
- Sediment transport
- Tidal scour
