= Submarine pipeline =

Pipeline that is laid on the seabed or below it inside a trench

A submarine pipeline (also known as marine, subsea or offshore pipeline) is a pipeline that is laid on the seabed or below it inside a trench. In some cases, the pipeline is mostly on-land but in places it crosses water expanses, such as small seas, straits and rivers. Submarine pipelines are used primarily to carry oil or gas, but transportation of water is also important. A distinction is sometimes made between a flowline and a pipeline. The former is an intrafield pipeline, in the sense that it is used to connect subsea wellheads, manifolds and the platform within a particular development field. The latter, sometimes referred to as an export pipeline, is used to bring the resource to shore. Sizeable pipeline construction projects need to take into account many factors, such as the offshore ecology, geohazards and environmental loading – they are often undertaken by multidisciplinary, international teams.

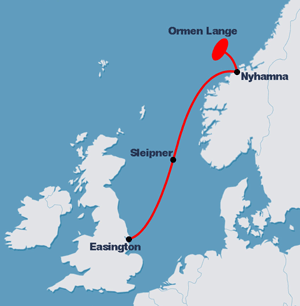
Example of a submarine pipeline route: the Langeled pipeline.

== Route selection ==
One of the earliest and most critical tasks in a submarine pipeline planning exercise is the route selection. This selection has to consider a variety of issues, some of a political nature, but most others dealing with geohazards, physical factors along the prospective route, and other uses of the seabed in the area considered. This task begins with a fact-finding exercise, which is a standard desk study that includes a survey of geological maps, bathymetry, fishing charts, aerial and satellite photography, as well as information from navigation authorities.

=== Physical factors ===
Interaction between a submarine pipeline and the seabed onto which it rests (four possible scenarios).

The primary physical factor to be considered in submarine pipeline construction is the state of the seabed – whether it is smooth (i.e., relatively flat) or uneven (corrugated, with high points and low points). If it is uneven, the pipeline will include free spans when it connects two high points, leaving the section in between unsupported. If an unsupported section is too long, the bending stress exerted onto it (due to its weight) may be excessive. Vibration from current-induced vortexes may also become an issue. Corrective measures for unsupported pipeline spans include seabed leveling and post-installation support, such as berm or sand infilling below the pipeline. The strength of the seabed is another significant parameter. If the soil is not strong enough, the pipeline may sink into it to an extent where inspection, maintenance procedures and prospective tie-ins become difficult to carry out. At the other extreme, a rocky seabed is expensive to trench and, at high points, abrasion and damage of the pipeline's external coating may occur. Ideally, the soil should be such as to allow the pipe to settle into it to some extent, thereby providing it with some lateral stability.

One of a number of reasons why submarine pipelines are buried below the seabed: to protect them against the gouging action of drifting ice features, such as icebergs.

Other physical factors to be taken into account prior to building a pipeline include the following:

- Seabed mobility: Sand waves and megaripples are features that move with time, such that a pipeline that was supported by the crest of one such feature during construction may find itself in a trough later during the pipeline's operational lifespan. The evolution of these features is difficult to predict so it is preferable to avoid the areas where they are known to exist.
- Submarine landslides: They result from high sedimentation rates and occur on steeper slopes. They can be triggered by earthquakes. When the soil around the pipe is subjected to a slide, especially if the resulting displacement is at high angle to the line, the pipe within it can incur severe bending and consequent tensile failure.
- Currents: High currents are objectionable in that they hinder pipe laying operations. For instance, in shallow seas tidal currents may be quite strong in a strait between two islands. Under these circumstances, it may be preferable to bring the pipe elsewhere, even if this alternative route ends up being longer.
- Waves: In shallow waters, waves can also be problematic for pipeline laying operations (in severe wave regimes) and, subsequently, to its stability, because of the water's scouring action. This is one of a number of reasons why landfalls (where the pipeline reaches the shoreline) are particularly delicate areas to plan.
- Ice-related issues: In freezing waters, floating ice features often drift into shallower waters, and their keel comes into contact with the seabed. As they continue to drift, they gouge the seabed and can hit the pipeline. Stamukhi can also damage this structure, either by exerting high local stresses on it or by causing to soil around it to fail, thereby inducing excessive bending. Strudel are another pipeline hazard in cold waters – water gushing through them can remove the soil from below the structure, making it vulnerable to overstress (due to self-weight) or vortex-induced oscillations. Pipeline route planning for areas where these risks are known to exist has to consider laying the pipeline in a back-filled trench.

=== Other uses of the seabed ===
Proper planning of a pipeline route has to factor in a wide range of human activities that make use of the seabed along the proposed route, or that are likely to do so in the future. They include the following:

- Other pipelines: If and where the proposed pipeline intersects an existing one, which is not uncommon, a bridging structure may be required at that juncture in order to cross it. This has to be done at a right angle. The juncture should be carefully designed so as to avoid interferences between the two structures either by direct physical contact or due to hydrodynamic effects.
- Fishing vessels: Commercial fishing makes use of heavy fishing nets dragged on the seabed and extending several kilometers behind the trawler. This net could snag the pipeline, with potential damage to both pipeline and vessel.
- Ship anchors: Ship anchors are a potential threat to pipelines, especially near harbors.
- Military activities: Some areas still have mines originating from former conflicts but that are still operational. Other areas, used for bombing or gunning practices, may also conceal live ammunition. Moreover, at some locations, various types of instrumentation are laid on the seafloor for submarine detection. These areas have to be avoided.

== Submarine pipeline characteristics ==
Submarine pipelines generally vary in diameter from 3 inches (76 mm) for gas lines, to 72 inches (1,800 mm) for high capacity lines. Wall thicknesses typically range from 10 to 75 millimetres (0.39 to 2.95 in). The pipe can be designed for fluids at high temperature and pressure. The walls are made from high-yield strength steel, 350-500 MPa (50,000-70,000 psi), weldability being one of the main selection criteria. The structure is often shielded against external corrosion by coatings such as bitumastic or epoxy, supplemented by cathodic protection with sacrificial anodes. Concrete or fiberglass wrapping provides further protection against abrasion. The addition of a concrete coating is also useful to compensate for the pipeline's positive buoyancy when it carries lower density substances.

The pipeline's inside wall is not coated for petroleum service. But when it carries seawater or corrosive substances, it can be coated with epoxy, polyurethane or polyethylene; it can also be cement-lined. In the petroleum industry, where leaks are unacceptable and the pipelines are subject to internal pressures typically in the order of 10 MPa (1500 psi), the segments are joined by full penetration welds. Mechanical joints are also used. A pig is a standard device in pipeline transport, be it on-land or offshore. It is used to test for hydrostatic pressure, to check for dents and crimps on the sidewalls inside the pipe, and to conduct periodic cleaning and minor repairs.

== Pipeline construction ==
Pipeline construction involves two procedures: assembling many pipe segments into a full line, and installing that line along the desired route. Several systems can be used – for a submarine pipeline, the choice in favor of any one of them is based on the following factors: physical and environmental conditions (e.g. currents, wave regime), availability of equipment and costs, water depth, pipeline length and diameter, constraints tied to the presence of other lines and structures along the route. These systems are generally divided into four broad categories: pull/tow, S-lay, J-lay and reel-lay.

Simplified drawings showing three configurations used to tow subsea pipelines offshore to the planned installation site (not to scale).

=== The pull/tow system ===
In the pull/tow system, the submarine pipeline is assembled onshore and then towed to location. Assembly is done either parallel or perpendicular to the shoreline – in the former case, the full line can be built prior to tow out and installation. A significant advantage with the pull/tow system is that pre-testing and inspection of the line are done onshore, not at sea. It allows to handle lines of any size and complexity. As for the towing procedures, a number of configurations can be used, which may be categorized as follows: surface tow, near-surface tow, mid-depth tow and off-bottom tow.

- Surface tow: In this configuration, the pipeline remains at the surface of the water during tow, and is then sunk into position at lay site. The line has to be buoyant – this can be done with individual buoyancy units attached to it. Surface tows are not appropriate for rough seas and are vulnerable to lateral currents.
- Near-surface tow: The pipeline remains below the water surface but close to it – this mitigates wave action. But the spar buoys used to maintain the line at that level are affected by rough seas, which in itself may represent a challenge for the towing operation.
- Mid-depth tow: The pipeline is not buoyant – either because it is heavy or it is weighted down by hanging chains. In this configuration, the line is suspended in a catenary between two towing vessels. The shape of that catenary (the sag) is a balance between the line's weight, the tension applied to it by the vessels and hydrodynamic lift on the chains. The amount of allowable sag is limited by how far down the seabed is.
- Off-bottom tow: This configuration is similar to the mid-depth tow, but here the line is maintained within 1 to 2 m (several feet) away from the bottom, using chains dragging on the seabed.
- Bottom tow: In this case, the pipeline is dragged onto the bottom – the line is not affected by waves and currents, and if the sea gets too rough for the tow vessel, the line can simply be abandoned and recovered later. Challenges with this type of system include: requirement for an abrasion-resistant coating, interaction with other submarine pipelines and potential obstructions (reef, boulders, etc.). Bottom tow is commonly used for river crossings and crossings between shores.

Simplified drawings of three common systems used for the construction and installation of subsea pipelines (not to scale): S-lay, J-lay and reel.

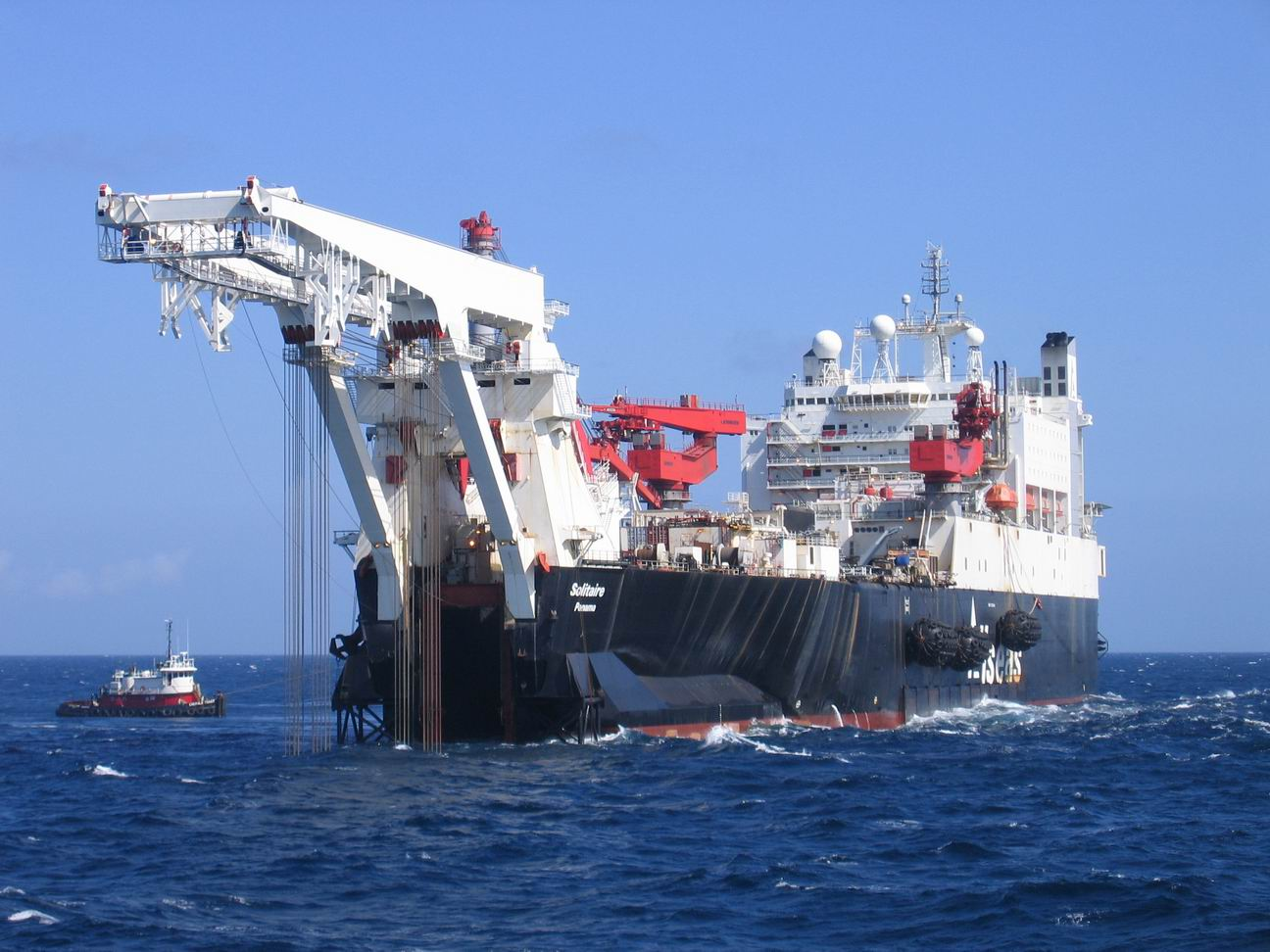
The Solitaire, one of the largest pipe-laying ships in the world.

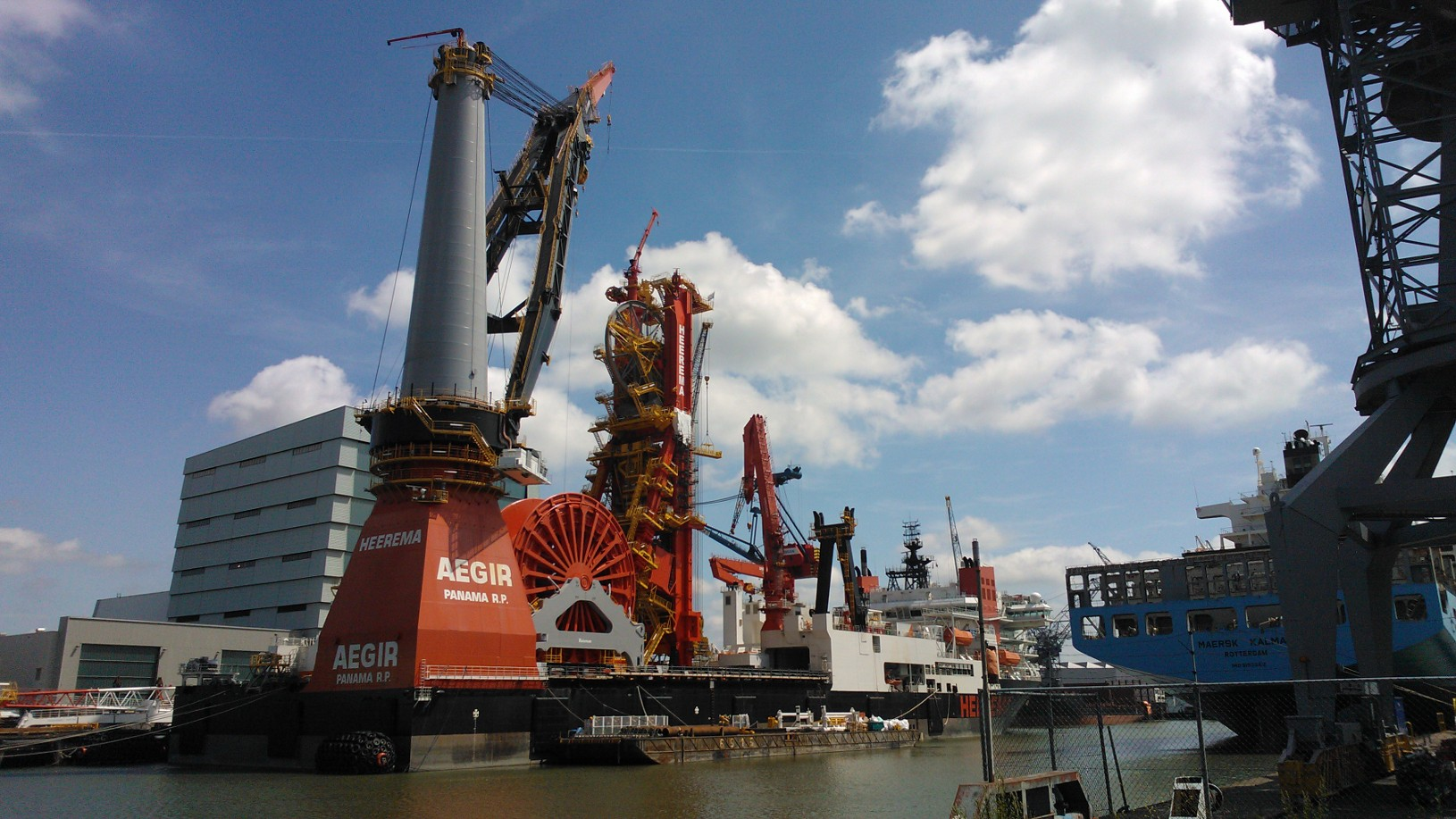
The DCV Aegir, a pipelay vessel designed for J-lay and reel-lay.

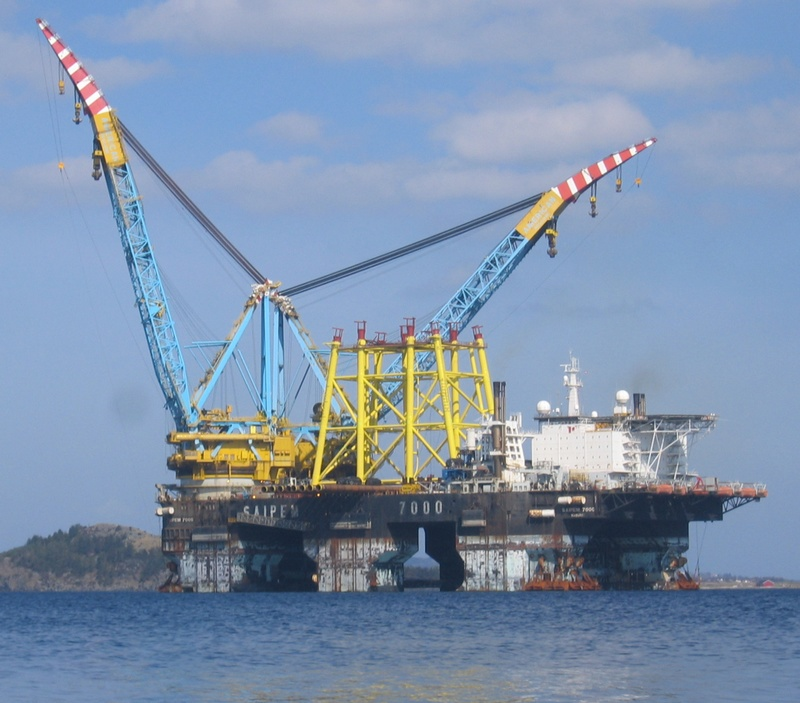
The Saipem 7000, a semi-submersible crane vessel equipped with a J-lay pipe-laying system.

=== The S-lay system ===
In the S-lay system, the pipeline assembly is done at the installation site, on board a vessel that has all the equipment required for joining the pipe segments: pipe handling conveyors, welding stations, X-ray equipment, joint-coating module, etc. The S notation refers to the shape of the pipeline as it is laid onto the seabed. The pipeline leaves the vessel at the stern or bow from a supporting structure called a stinger that guides the pipe's downward motion and controls the convex-upward curve (the overbend). As it continues toward the seabed, the pipe has a convex-downward curve (the sagbend) before coming into contact with the seabed (touch down point). The sagbend is controlled by a tension applied from the vessel (via tensioners) in response to the pipeline's submerged weight. The pipeline configuration is monitored so that it will not get damaged by excessive bending. This on-site pipeline assembly approach, referred to as lay-barge construction, is known for its versatility and self-contained nature – despite the high costs associated with this vessel's deployment, it is efficient and requires relatively little external support. But it may have to contend with severe sea states – these adversely affect operations such as pipe transfer from supply boats, anchor-handling and pipe welding. Recent developments in lay-barge design include dynamic positioning and the J-lay system.

=== The J-lay system ===
In areas where the water is very deep, the S-lay system may not be appropriate because the pipeline leaves the stinger to go almost straight down. To avoid sharp bending at the end of it and to mitigate excessive sag bending, the tension in the pipeline would have to be high. Doing so would interfere with the vessel's positioning, and the tensioner could damage the pipeline. A particularly long stinger could be used, but this is also objectionable since that structure would be adversely affected by winds and currents. The J-lay system, one of the latest generations of lay-barge, is better suited for deep water environments. In this system, the pipeline leaves the vessel on a nearly vertical ramp (or tower). There is no overbend – only a sagbend of catenary nature (hence the J notation), such that the tension can be reduced. The pipeline is also less exposed to wave action as it enters the water. However, unlike for the S-lay system, where pipe welding can be done simultaneously at several locations along the vessel deck's length, the J-lay system can only accommodate one welding station. Advanced methods of automatic welding are used to compensate for this drawback.

=== The Reel-lay system ===
In the reel-lay system, the pipeline is assembled onshore and is spooled onto a large drum typically about 20 by 6 metres (66 ft × 20 ft) in size, mounted on board a purpose-built vessel. The vessel then goes out to location to lay the pipeline. Onshore facilities to assemble the pipeline have inherent advantages: they are not affected by the weather or the sea state and are less expensive than seaborne operations. Pipeline supply can be coordinated: while one line is being laid at sea, another one can be spooled onshore. A single reel can have enough capacity for a full-length flow line. The reel-lay system, however, can only handle lower diameter pipelines – up to about 400 mm (16 in). Also, the kind of steel making up the pipes must be able to undergo the required amount of plastic deformation as it is bent to proper curvature (by a spiral J-tube) when reeled around the drum, and straightened back (by a straightener) during the layout operations at the installation site.

== Stabilisation ==
Several methods are used to stabilise and protect submarine pipelines and their components. These may be used alone or in combinations.

=== Trenching and burial ===
Simplified drawing showing a typical jetting system for trenching below a submarine pipeline that is lying on the seafloor.

A submarine pipeline may be laid inside a trench as a means of safeguarding it against fishing gear (e.g. anchors) and trawling activity. This may also be required in shore approaches to protect the pipeline against currents and wave action (as it crosses the surf zone). Trenching can be done prior to pipeline lay (pre-lay trenching), or afterward by seabed removal from below the pipeline (post-lay trenching). In the latter case, the trenching device rides on top of, or straddles, the pipeline. Several systems are used to dig trenches in the seabed for submarine pipelines:

- Jetting: This is a post-lay trenching procedure whereby the soil is removed from beneath the pipeline by using powerful pumps to blow water on each side of it.
- Mechanical cutting: This system uses chains or cutter disks to dig through and remove harder soils, including boulders, from below the pipeline.
- Plowing: The plowing principle, which was initially used for pre-lay trenching, has evolved into sophisticated systems that are lighter in size for faster and safer operation.
- Dredging/excavation: In shallower water, the soil can be removed with a dredger or an excavator prior to laying the pipeline. This can be done in a number of ways, notably with a ′′cutter-suction′′ system, with the use of buckets or with a backhoe.

″A buried pipe is far better protected than a pipe in an open trench.″ This is commonly done either by covering the structure with rocks quarried from a nearby shoreline. Alternatively, the soil excavated from the seabed during trenching can be used as backfill. A significant drawback to burial is the difficulty in locating a leak should it arise, and for the ensuing repairing operations.

=== Mattresses ===
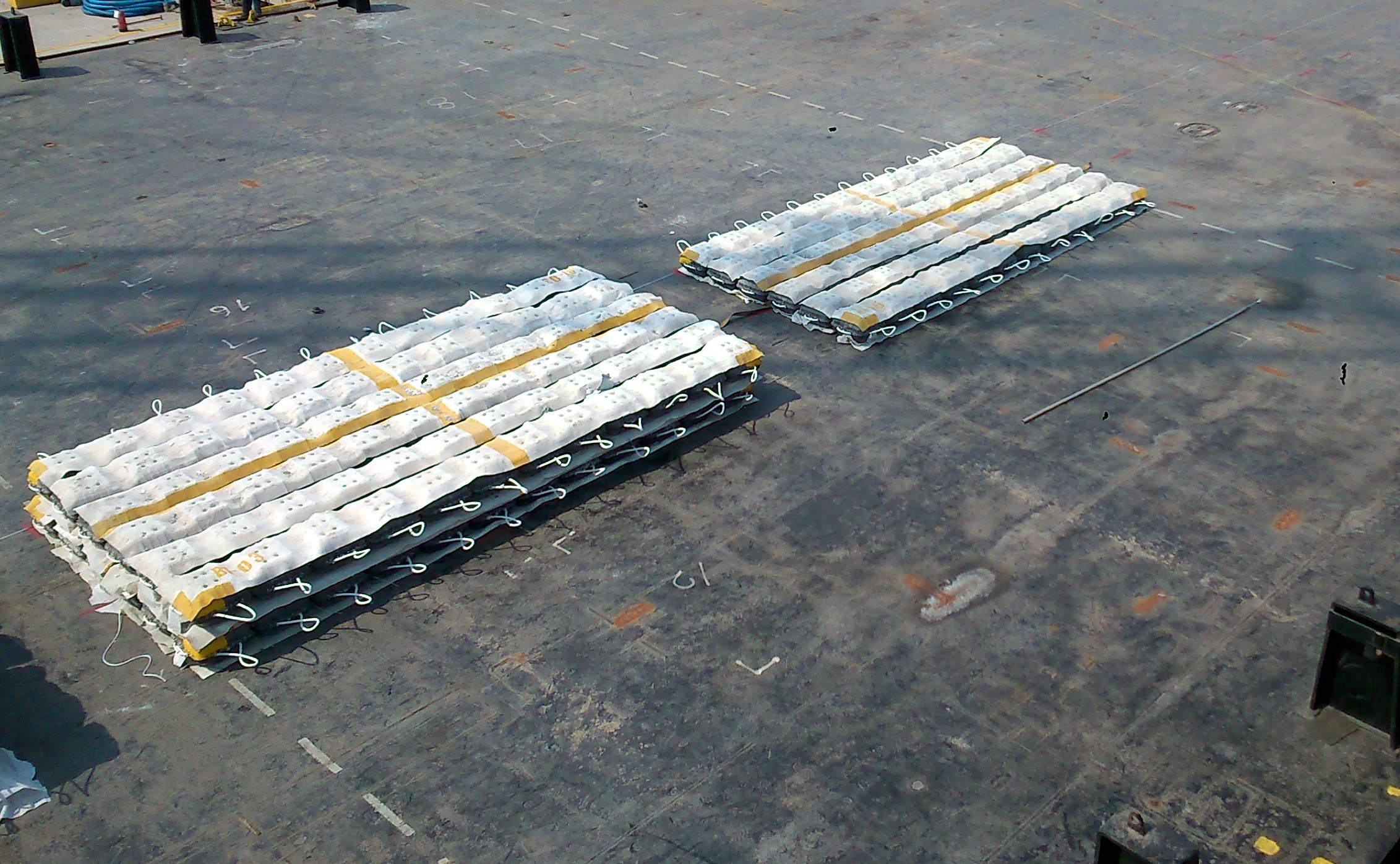
Concrete mattresses on barge

Mattresses may be laid over the pipeline, or both under and over it depending on the substrate.

- Frond mattresses have an effect similar to seaweed and tend to cause sand to accumulate. They must be anchored to the bottom to prevent being washed away.
- Concrete mattresses are used to help hold part of the pipeline in place by their weight and reduce scour. They are usually heavy enough to be held in place by their own weight, as they are made from concrete blocks linked together by rope.
- Combination mattresses of concrete mattress with overlaid frond mattress are also used.

=== Ground anchors ===
Clamps holding the pipeline to piles may be used to prevent lateral movement.

=== Saddle blocks ===
Precast concrete saddle blocks may be used to provide lateral support and hold the pipeline down more firmly.

=== Sandbags and groutbags ===
These may be packed at the sides or under a pipeline to provide vertical and/or lateral support.

=== Gravel dumps ===
Gravel may be dumped over parts of a pipeline to reduce scour and help stabilise against lateral movement.

== Environmental and legal issues ==
The Espoo Convention created certain requirements for notification and consultation where a project is likely to have transboundary environmental effects. Scholars are divided on how effective Espoo is at mitigating environmental harm. Law of the Sea concepts involved in the construction of transboundary pipelines concern territorial waters, continental shelves, exclusive economic zones, freedom of the high seas and protection of the environment. Under international law the high seas are open to all states to lay underwater pipelines and for various other types of construction.

Underwater pipelines pose environmental risk because pipelines themselves may become damaged by ship's anchors, corrosion, tectonic activity, or as a result of defective construction and materials. Stanislav Patin has said that study on the effects of natural gas on underwater ecosystems, fish and other marine organisms has been limited. Researchers found a cause-effect relationship between mass fish mortality and natural gas leaks after drilling accidents in the Sea of Azov in 1982 and 1985.

Concerns about the environmental risks of underwater pipelines have been raised on numerous occasions. There have been at least two serious incidents involving oil pipelines on the UK's continental shelf. There have also been several "minor spills and gas leaks" involving other North Sea pipelines. In 1980 a pipeline was damaged by a ship's anchor and in 1986 a pipeline valve failed due to pressure changed. Both incidents resulted in oil spills. Several Baltic countries expressed concerns about the Nord Stream pipeline. The route of the 1,200 km underwater pipeline would travel through fishing areas of the Baltic Sea, as well as area where chemical weapons from World War II had been discarded.

== Protection of submarine pipelines ==
=== Significance of submarine pipelines ===
Submarine pipelines are crucial to the global energy infrastructure and supply. This infrastructure contributes to global energy security, as its function is to transport oil, natural gas and other resources over vast distances. In December 2020, operational oil pipelines worldwide had a daily capacity of almost 100 million barrels of oil equivalent. The regions with the longest operational oil pipeline network in 2024 in kilometres are North America with 111,353 km, Asia with 86,717 km and Europe in third place with 74,077 km. Pipelines have been of geopolitical and national security priority since the beginning of their construction. Disruptions to pipeline operations can cause significant economic losses, environmental hazards, and energy shortages for the affected parties, reflecting the need for their sufficient protection to be of high priority. Key challenges related to critical maritime infrastructure protection are human activity, geographical accessibility, natural hazards, sabotage, maintenance and monitoring and lack of international cooperation.

=== Threats: intentional human activity ===
Earlier debates about critical maritime infrastructure have shifted from emphasis on terrorism and cyber threats toward the increasing frequency and efficacy of hybrid tactics. The Nord Stream sabotage demonstrates hybrid attacks, which aim to induce significant damage to an adversary while operating in a way that makes detection, attribution and response difficult to enact, blurring the conceptual lines between conflict and peace.

=== Increased attention ===
Despite underwater pipelines being categorized as critical infrastructure they only recently became a prominent issue in debates about maritime security. Previously, pipelines had been overlooked and neglected in geopolitical security debates. One reason for the increased attention is the growing threat to critical infrastructure on the seabed and the resulting risk to national security. The shift in attention changed especially after the sabotage of the Nord Stream pipelines in the Baltic Sea in September 2022. The explosion highlighted the need for prioritization of critical maritime infrastructure protection, including vulnerabilities of marine infrastructure and the inadequacy of the current protection and response mechanisms. The perpetrators of the sabotage of the Nord Stream pipeline are still not caught, despite observers' accounts stating that the incident had a high level of sophistication implying either state sponsorship or another form of governmental backing.

=== Protection of submarine pipelines ===
NATO working to enhance the security of underwater infrastructure to prevent and respond to threats such as organized crime and hybrid attacks like the explosion of the Nord Stream Pipeline. In 2023, at the Vilnius summit, NATO launched a new centre for the protection of underwater pipelines following the to-date unsolved case of sabotage on the Nord Stream pipelines and growing concern that Russia is mapping infrastructure in waters around Europe. The centre is dedicated to the security of the vast network of underwater energy pipelines demonstrated to be vulnerable to attacks to disrupt energy supply and economic activity.

The European Union has also updated its maritime security strategy involving the protection of underwater pipelines. The strategy promotes rules-based governance at sea and boosts international cooperation The objective of the strategy is to increase the resilience and protection of critical maritime infrastructure such as gas pipelines and underwater cables. The strategy comprises six strategic objectives. The first is to escalate activities at sea such as security exercises and the second is to cooperate with partners such as regional and international organisations. The third objective is to lead maritime domain awareness such as information collection and exchange among authorities, to manage risks and threats involving improving the collective resilience of the EU and its member states, to enhance civilian and military capabilities and lastly, to educate and train to ensure a high level of specialised education and skills which is largely focused on skills needed to tackle hybrid threats.

=== Responses to the Nord Stream sabotage ===
After the Nord Stream sabotage in 2022, NATO and the European Union intensified their attention towards the protection of maritime infrastructure. This resulted in increased policy activity and new protection strategies and plans, including the procurement of additional naval vessels to be used for seabed infrastructure protection. The sabotage of the Nord Stream pipeline in 2022 triggered a substantial response, especially among North Sea coastal states. In 2023, the UK added a new surveillance ship, the RFA Proteus, to its fleet. The vessel's purpose is to monitor the seabed and ensure infrastructure safety. Norway increased its security measures around the country's oil and gas infrastructure, involving an increased presence of the Navy, Coast Guard and Air Force covering all domains including subsea and cyber. Highlighting the need for cooperation in response to the threat against critical maritime infrastructure, Norway also accepted assistance from the UK, France and Germany offering their naval resources to restore and increase the security surrounding the oil and gas infrastructure in the North Sea.

== See also ==
- Geohazard – Geological state that may lead to widespread damage or risk
- Ocean – Body of salt water covering most of Earth
- Offshore construction – Installation of structures and facilities in a marine environment
- Offshore drilling – Mechanical process where a wellbore is drilled below the seabed
- Offshore geotechnical engineering – Sub-field of engineering concerned with human-made structures in the sea
- Offshore (hydrocarbons)
- Oil platform – Offshore ocean structure with oil drilling and related facilities
- Pipe-laying ship – Ship type used to lay subsea pipelines
- Seabed – Bottom of the ocean
- Seabed gouging by ice – Outcome of the interaction between drifting ice and the seabed
- Subsea (technology) – Technology of submerged operations in the sea
- Subsea valves – Valve used to control undersea material flow

== Bibliography ==
- Bai Y. & Bai Q. (2010) Subsea Engineering Handbook. Gulf Professional Publishing, New York, 919 p.
- Barrette, P (2011). "Offshore pipeline protection against seabed gouging by ice: An overview". Cold Regions Science and Technology. 69 (1): 3–20. Bibcode:2011CRST...69....3B. doi:10.1016/j.coldregions.2011.06.007.
- Bisht, I. S. (2022, October 3). UK to Procure Seabed Surveillance Vessels for Infrastructure Safety. The Defense Post. https://thedefensepost.com/2022/10/03/uk-seabed-surveillance-vessels/
- Brooke-Holland, L. (2023). Seabed warfare: Protecting the UK's undersea infrastructure. https://commonslibrary.parliament.uk/seabed-warfare-protecting-the-uks-undersea-infrastructure/
- Brown R.J. (2006) Past, present, and future towing of pipelines and risers. In: Proceedings of the 38th Offshore Technology Conference (OTC). Houston, U.S.A.
- Bueger, C., & Edmunds, T. (2024). Understanding Maritime Security. Oxford University Press.
- Bueger, C., & Liebetrau, T. (2023). Critical maritime infrastructure protection: What's the trouble? Marine Policy, 155, 105772.
- Cook, L. (2023, June 16). NATO moves to protect undersea pipelines, cables as concern mounts over Russian sabotage threat. AP News. https://apnews.com/article/nato-russia-sabotage-pipelines-cables-infrastructure-507929033b05b5651475c8738179ba5c
- Council of the EU. (2023, October 24). Maritime security: Council approves revised EU strategy and action plan. Consilium. https://www.consilium.europa.eu/en/press/press-releases/2023/10/24/maritime-security-council-approves-revised-eu-strategy-and-action-plan/
- Croasdale K., Been K., Crocker G., Peek R. & Verlaan P. (2013) Stamukha loading cases for pipelines in the Caspian Sea. Proceedings of the 22nd International Conference on Port and Ocean Engineering under Arctic Conditions (POAC), Espoo, Finland.
- Dean E.T.R. (2010) Offshore Geotechnical Engineering - Principles and Practice, Thomas Telford, Reston, VA, U.S.A., 520 p.
- Gerwick B.C. (2007) Construction of marine and offshore structures. CRC Press, New York, 795 p.
- Häggblom, R. (2022, October 4). Nordic Countries' Response to Nord Stream Sabotage. Naval News. https://www.navalnews.com/naval-news/2022/10/nordic-countries-response-to-nord-stream-sabotage/
- MARCOM, P. A. O. (2024). NATO officially launches new Maritime Centre for Security of Critical Undersea Infrastructure. Mc.Nato.Int. https://mc.nato.int/media-centre/news/2024/nato-officially-launches-new-nmcscui.aspx
- Monaghan, S., Svendsen, O., Darrah, M., & Arnold, E. (2023). NATO's Role in Protecting Critical Undersea Infrastructure. Center for Strategic and International Studies (CSIS); JSTOR. http://www.jstor.org.ep.fjernadgang.kb.dk/stable/resrep55403
- Nasiri, H. (2024, May 4). Managing Undersea Pipeline Damage: Strategies for Prevention, Response, and Recovery. 9th International Conference on Civil, Structural and Seismic Engineering. https://www.researchgate.net/publication/380343395_Managing_Undersea_Pipeline_Damage_Strategies_for_Prevention_Response_and_Recovery
- Palmer, A.C. & Been K. (2011) Pipeline geohazards for Arctic conditions. In: W.O. McCarron (Editor), Deepwater Foundations and Pipeline Geomechanics, J. Ross Publishing, Fort Lauderdale, Florida, pp. 171–188.
- Palmer, A. C. & King R. A. (2008). Subsea Pipeline Engineering (2nd ed.). Tulsa, USA: Pennwell, 624 p.
- Ramakrishnan T.V. (2008) Offshore engineering. Gene-Tech Books, New Delhi, 347 p.
- Shapiro, J., & McNeish, J.-A. (Eds.). (2021). Our Extractive Age: Expressions of Violence and Resistance. Routledge. https://doi.org/10.4324/9781003127611
- Statista. (2024a). Daily capacity of oil pipelines worldwide as of December 2020, by status. Statista Research Department.
- Statista. (2024b). Global oil pipeline length 2024, by region. Statista Research Department. https://www.statista.com/statistics/1491014/length-of-oil-pipelines-by-region/
- Wilson J.F. (2003) Structures in the offshore environment. In: J.F. Wilson (Editor), Dynamics of Offshore Structures. John Wiley & Sons, Hoboken, New Jersey, U.S.A., pp. 1–16.
