= Subsea valves =

Valve used to control undersea material flow

Subsea valves are used to isolate or control the flow of material through an undersea pipeline (submarine pipeline) or other apparatus. Most commonly used to transport oil and gas, they are designed to function in a sub-marine environment, withstanding the effects of raised external pressure, salt-water corrosion, and bubbles or debris in the material carried. Subsea valves undergo stringent testing to ensure high reliability.

== Usage ==
Subsea valves are used in sub-marine environments, which can range in depth from shallow water (usually down to a depth of 75 meters) to deep water (down to 3500 meters). Various industries use subsea valves, with the oil and gas sector accounting for the majority, where there is a need to move material from, to, or below the seabed.

== Hazards to subsea valves ==
External environmental factors to be considered specifically for subsea valves include waterproofing, increased ambient pressure, and long-term corrosion from the high salt content of seawater.

Internal factors to consider for subsea valves are related to the type of flow material (what passes through the valve apparatus). Typically in subsea environments, the flows will either be liquid or gas based but due to location of the operation, the flow can contain a significant amount of sand and debris. This can present internal structural challenges.

One of the most challenging aspects for subsea valve deployment is cavitation. This occurs when liquid, being pumped through various pieces of machinery including the subsea valve, contains bubbles (or cavities). When the bubbles move through the system into areas of higher pressure they will collapse, and on moving into areas with lower pressure they will expand. This can have several negative effects including:

- An increase in noise and more importantly vibration, which may cause damage to a number of machinery components including the subsea valve and in extreme cases cause total pump failure.
- The pump may undergo a reduction in capacity.
- Pressure may not be maintained, potentially causing fracturing within the pump.
- Overall pump efficiency drops.

Due to the subsea valve not being easily accessible, it is of particular importance that it can function without hindrance, as replacement may be extremely costly.

== Subsea valve testing ==
To overcome the problems associated with sub-marine environments, subsea valves are required to pass a number of stringent tests. These may include (as applicable):

- Gas testing according to API 6DSS / API 17D or API 6A (PSL 2, PSL 3, PSL 3G or PSL 4)
- Performance verification test according to API 6A PR 2
- Hyperbaric testing
- Endurance Testing according to API6A
- Bending calculation and test
- Seismic test
