= Andrew Clennel Palmer =

British engineer (1938–2019)

Professor Andrew Clennel Palmer FRS FREng FICE

Professor of Civil Engineering, National University of Singapore
- In office 2007–2015

Jafar Research Professor of Petroleum Engineering, University of Cambridge
- In office 1996–2005

Personal details
- Born: 26 May 1938 Colchester, Essex, England
- Died: 21 December 2019 (aged 81)

Andrew Clennel Palmer (26 May 1938 – 21 December 2019) was a British engineer who worked on offshore geotechnical problems of submarine pipeline design and the study of the properties of ice. He spent much of his career as a teacher and academic researcher, at the University of Liverpool, Cambridge University, the University of Manchester Institute of Science and Technology, and the National University of Singapore, punctuated by work in industry, while also serving as an expert witness and as a member of various industrial and academic committees.

== Early life and education ==
Born in Colchester, Palmer was the son of Gerald Basil Coote Palmer, headmaster of Mark Hall Comprehensive School in Harlow, and Muriel née Howes. After attending the Royal Liberty School in Gidea Park, he read Mechanical Sciences at Pembroke College, Cambridge, completing his undergraduate degree in 1961. He achieved first-class honours in his first two years (the third being unclassed).

== Academia ==
Daniel C. Drucker was visiting Cambridge while Palmer was a student and was sufficiently impressed to extend an invitation to return to Brown University and perform research there, which Palmer accepted after graduation, receiving a doctorate in 1965. Drucker said that his work could have been worth three doctorates. His work at Brown included plasticity, glacial creep and ice lensing.

After his doctorate, Palmer spent two years as a lecturer at the University of Liverpool, but was dissatisfied with the university's engineering curriculum and returned to Cambridge in 1967, where he became a fellow of Churchill College. His initial research there was on the physical properties of soil and how temperature affected soil plasticity; he was able to analogise from the stress–strain relationships in metals, which were more understood.

These topics led to his involvement with BP's trans-Alaska pipeline project, beginning in 1970 with the company seeking an expert in permafrost; Palmer had no specific understanding of oil pipelines, but the company was seeking a new perspective on its engineering problems, and he would follow up his initial work by contributing to the Forties and Ninian pipelines. He solved the problem of predicting the shape of the curve of a pipeline, and thus the mechanical stress it suffers, as it is being laid by an S-lay barge by building a physical model and dimensional analysis, avoiding the need for numerically-laborious calculation of finite element analysis.

== In industry and at UMIST ==
In 1975, after his engagement with BP, Palmer left Cambridge and joined R. J. Brown & Associates as an industrial engineer. He worked on the first under-ice pipelines in the arctic in Northern Canada, the Polar Gas pipeline and the Panarctic Drake F-76 flowline, serving as the project manager of the latter. Having physically modelled laying the pipeline, the physical model was used to optimise the process and the actual installation went very smoothly. After this success, Palmer stayed with the company and worked in London, Houston and Singapore, rising to the role of head of the London office, as well as travelling around Europe on business.

Palmer left R. J. Brown & Associates following other departures and conflict at the company. After a period of unemployment—the petroleum industry being in a slump—Palmer joined the University of Manchester Institute of Science and Technology and began a course to train practitioners in submarine pipeline design; the course would be repeated many times over the next forty years. Despite enjoying his tenure at the university, it was not long, spending only three years there before leaving during turmoil around budgets, job losses, and a merger with Victoria University.

== Andrew Palmer & Associates ==
Returning to industry, Palmer established a company, Andrew Palmer & Associates Limited (APAL). As well as consulting on various projects, APAL developed a modular software suite for oil engineers, PLUSONE. The company was successful and earned a reputation for high-quality engineering work, expanding from its original office in London to sites in Aberdeen, Glasgow and Newcastle and also becoming involved in project management, eventually employing over 55 people. The company had a high proportion of young and female employees, and practiced employee stock ownership and equally shared profits between employees—though the latter was not entirely a success. Palmer did not enjoy the role of being a manager, preferring to be involved in the engineering process, and the company was sold in 1993, with Palmer staying on until 1996 as part of the sale agreement.

== Return to academia ==
Palmer returned to Cambridge in 1996 as a professor of petroleum engineering, with a remit for cross-disciplinary collaboration. He flourished in this role, introducing students to a variety of the problems faced by practitioners, as well as in university administration and benefactor relations, soliciting donations from industry. During a sabbatical, he spent a year as a visiting professor at Harvard University.

He retired from Cambridge in 2005 and, in 2006, moved to the National University of Singapore to a chair sponsored by Keppel Corporation, where he continued to teach and supervise graduate students.

== Research ==
Palmer's initial topic of study was soil mechanics, particularly at low temperature; he would later investigate ice flow and the mechanical properties of ice, which would remain a recurrent, long-term interest of his.

He would deploy dimensional analysis, which he described as 'a magical way of finding useful results with almost no effort,' as well as physical models of systems that, while simple, nevertheless captured a relevant aspect of the problem and allowed for experimentation and optimisation cheaply, which was especially important before digital computers were powerful enough to simulate complex systems. Sometimes, the models were not so small: Palmer realised that the 1:20 scale modelling of storm hazards near Western Australia were insufficient, and instead was involved in building a large 1:6 flow cell.

His contribution to understanding how pipelines buckle form the basis of modern pipelines are designed to avoid this hazard, and he introduced a new way of laying pipelines in deep water partly-filled with seawater (previously, they had been laid empty), so that the walls did not need to be as thick (significantly reducing costs) to stop the pipelines buckling under the pressure.

== Other work ==
Palmer made himself available as an expert witness, and enjoyed working with lawyers, who he found quick-witted (though forgetful once a case was over). He testified for the Crown at the Piper Alpha disaster inquest and at various other investigations. He served on several committees and editorial boards, including as president of the Pipeline Industries Guild from 1998 to 2000.

== Personal life ==
Palmer met Jane Evans, an artist, on an American holiday while they were both volunteering to construct schools; they married in 1963, and had a daughter, Emily. The two shared many interests and hobbies, including art and travel.

As an undergraduate, Palmer was keenly left wing and debated at the Cambridge Union. He was elected president of his college's Junior Combination Room. He spoke many languages: as well as his native English, he learnt Chinese, Dutch, French, German, Italian, Russian and Spanish. Colleagues found him kind, if quirky, and he was well-liked.

== Awards ==
- Fellow of the Royal Society, 1994
- Fellow of the Royal Academy of Engineering
- Fellow of the Institution of Civil Engineers
- Clarkson University, honorary doctorate, 2007

== Bibliography ==
- King, Roger Anthony (27 July 2022). "Andrew Clennel Palmer. 26 May 1938—21 December 2019". Biographical Memoirs of Fellows of the Royal Society. 73: 379–393. doi:10.1098/rsbm.2022.0015. S2CID 251071307.
