= Stream bed =

Channel bottom of a stream, river, or creek

A streambed or stream bed is the bottom of a stream or river and is confined within a channel or the banks of the waterway. Usually, the bed does not contain terrestrial (land) vegetation and instead supports different types of aquatic vegetation (aquatic plant), depending on the type of streambed material and water velocity. Streambeds are what would be left once a stream is no longer in existence. The beds are usually well preserved even if they get buried because the banks and canyons made by the stream are typically hard, although soft sand and debris often fill the bed. Dry, buried streambeds can actually be underground water pockets. During times of rain, sandy streambeds can soak up and retain water, even during dry seasons, keeping the water table close enough to the surface to be obtainable by local people.

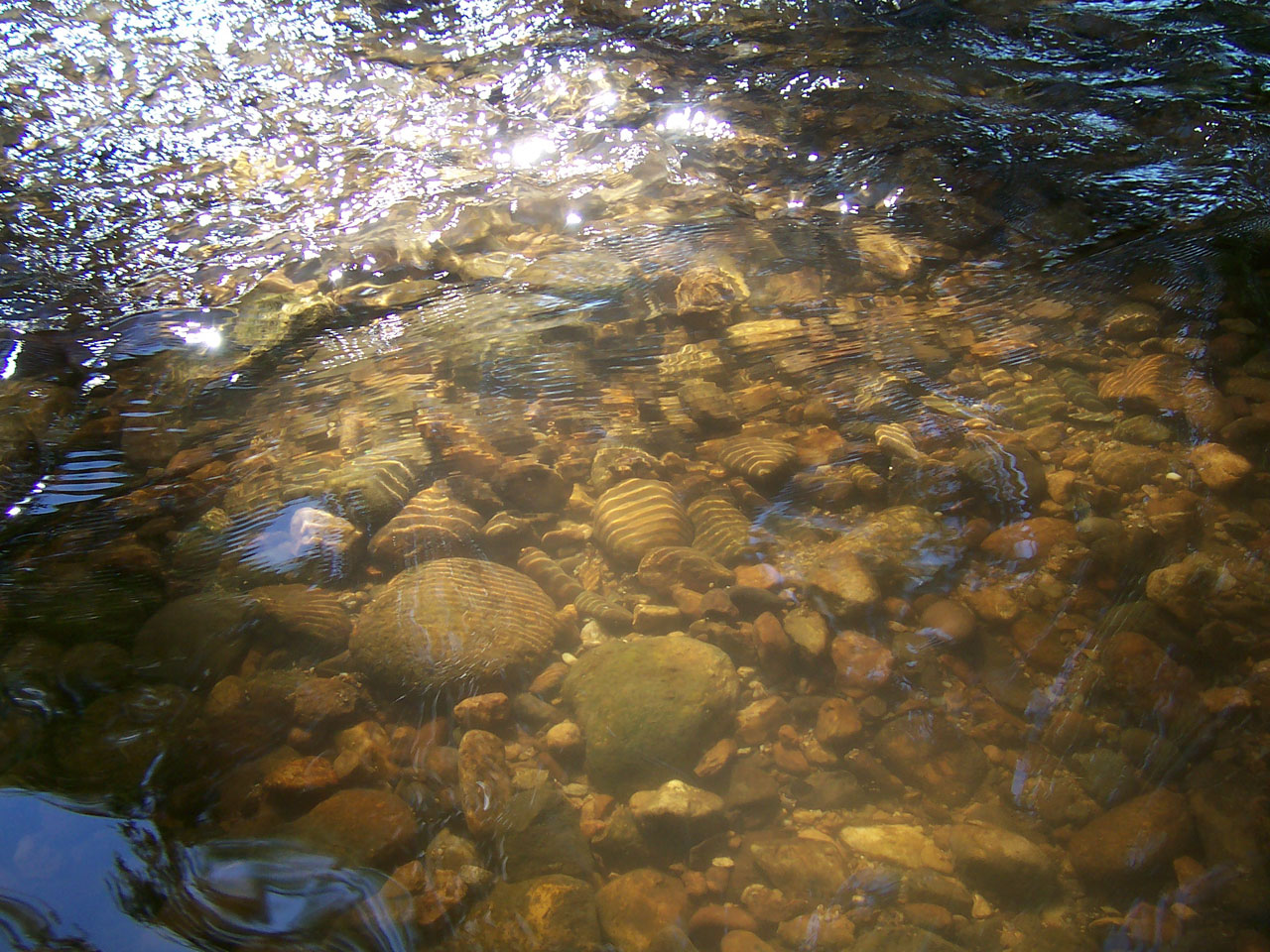
A stream bed armored with rocks

The nature of any streambed is always a function of the flow dynamics and the local geologic materials. The climate of an area will determine the amount of precipitation a stream receives and therefore the amount of water flowing over the streambed. A streambed is usually a mix of particle sizes which depends on the water velocity and the materials introduced from upstream and from the watershed. Particle sizes can range from very fine silts and clays to large cobbles and boulders (grain size). In general, sands move most easily, and particles become more difficult to move as they increase in size. Silts and clays, although smaller than sands, can sometimes stick together, making them harder to move along the streambed. In streams with a gravel bed, the larger grain sizes are usually on the bed surface with finer grain sizes below. This is called armoring of the streambed.

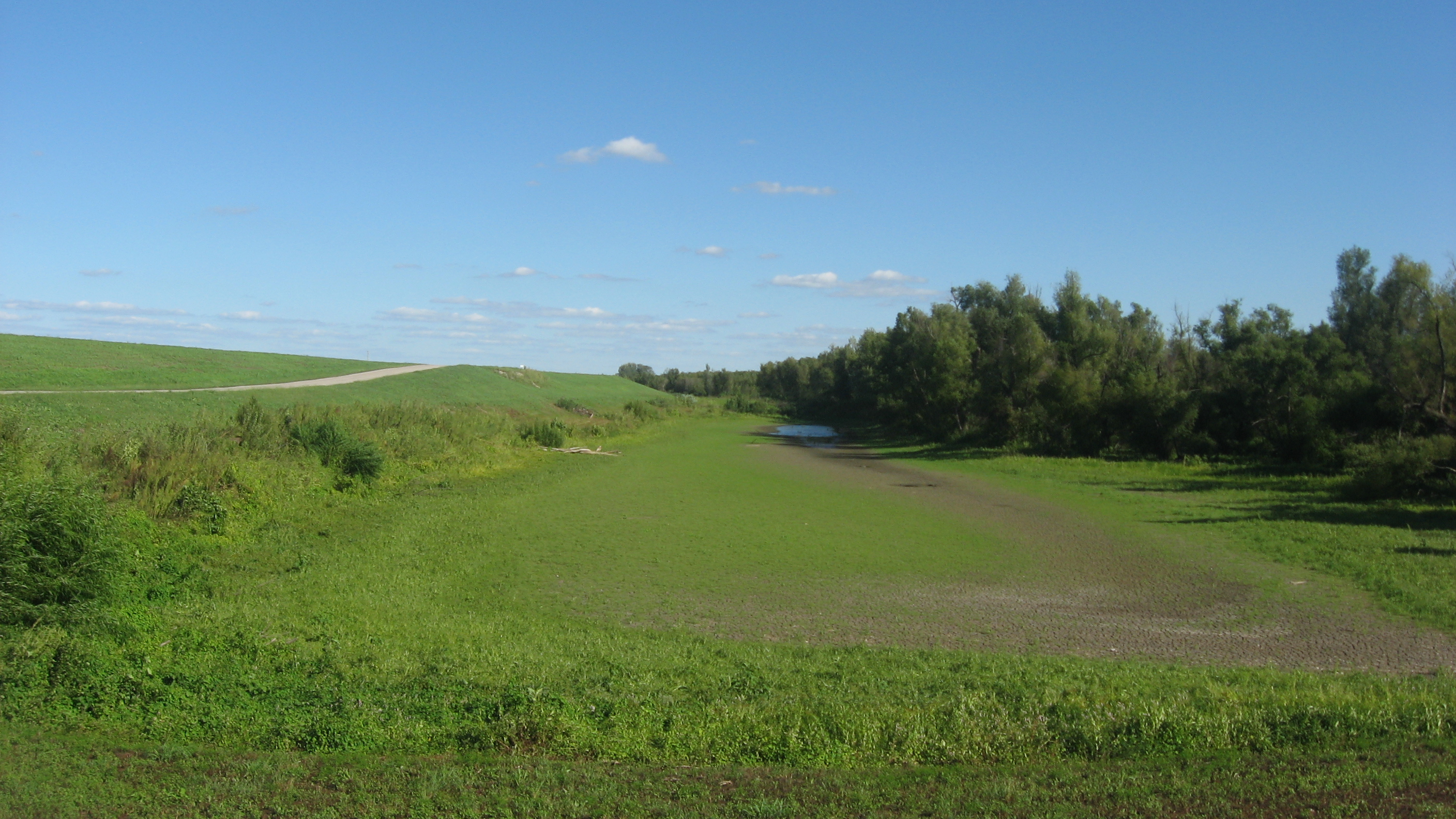
The old bed of the Mississippi River near Kaskaskia, Illinois, left behind after the river shifted

The streambed is very complex in terms of erosion and deposition. As the water flows downstream, different sized particles get sorted to different parts of a streambed as water velocity changes and sediment is transported, eroded and deposited on the streambed. Deposition usually occurs on the inside of curves, where water velocity slows, and erosion occurs on the outside of stream curves, where velocity is higher. This continued erosion and deposition of sediment tends to create meanders of the stream. In streams with a low to moderate grade, deeper, slower water pools (stream pools) and faster shallow water riffles often form as the stream meanders downhill. Pools can also form as water rushes over or around obstructions in the waterway.

Under certain conditions a river can branch from one streambed to multiple streambeds. For example, an anabranch may form when a section of stream or river goes around a small island and then rejoins the main channel. The buildup of sediment on a streambed may cause a channel to be abandoned in favor of a new one (avulsion (river)). A braided river may form as small threads come and go within a main channel. The measurement of riverbed depths is called bathymetry.

== Climate change ==
The intensity and frequency of both drought and rain events are expected to increase with climate change. Floods, or flood stage, occur when a stream overflows its banks. In undisturbed natural areas, flood water would be able to spread out within a floodplain and vegetation of either grassland or forest, would slow and absorb peak flows. In such areas, streambeds should remain more stable and exhibit minimal scour. They should retain rich organic matter and, therefore continue to support a rich biota (river ecosystem). The majority of sediment washed out in higher flows is "near-threshold" sediment that has been deposited during normal flow and only needs a slightly higher flow to become mobile again. This shows that the streambed is left mostly unchanged in size and shape over time. In urban and suburban areas with little natural vegetation, high levels of impervious surface, and no floodplain, unnaturally high levels of surface runoff can occur. This causes an increase in flooding and watershed erosion which can lead to thinner soils upslope. Streambeds can exhibit a greater amount of scour, often down to bedrock, and banks may be undercut causing bank erosion. This increased bank erosion widens the stream and can lead to an increased sediment load downstream.

== See also ==
- Armor (hydrology)
- Benthic zone
- Hyporheic zone
- Thalweg
