= Bridge maintenance =

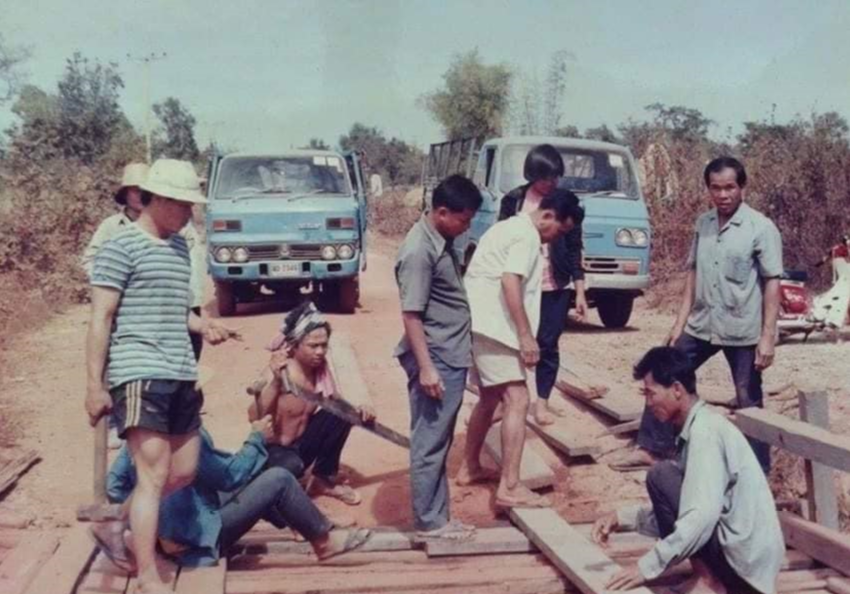
Villagers repairing the bridge in Buangam

Maintenance of bridge infrastructure presents many challenges. Transportation engineering and maintenance personnel must maintain around the clock service to millions of people each year while maintaining millions of cubic meters of concrete distributed throughout their facilities. This infrastructure includes bridges. Presently only a limited number of accurate and economical techniques exist to test these structures for integrity and safety as well as insure that they meet original design specifications.

No single technology can locate all physical anomalies in and below the concrete, these techniques along with data fusion can assist in the following investigations, to name a few:

1. Locating voids and delaminations in bridge pavements and scour around bridge support columns.
2. Determining location and types of reinforcing steel in concrete
3. Ensuring quality control on new concrete installations

== Techniques ==
=== Infrared thermography and ground-penetrating radar ===
Infrared thermography and ground-penetrating radar have been developed to locate voids and delaminations in concrete structures such as bridge decks, highways and airport pavements. Being able to locate voids and delaminations means the structural maintenance engineer can measure the actual cracking and weakening of concrete pavements before catastrophic failures can occur.

Concrete objects, such as bridges, emit energy based upon the absolute temperature of its surfaces and the surface temperatures are dependent upon the internal conditions of the concrete. These internal conditions can include physical conditions like:

1. Density changes in concrete
2. Voids caused by erosion beneath the concrete slabs
3. Horizontal delaminations caused by rust expansion of rusting internal reinforcing steel.

Infrared thermographic radiometer or “IR Imager” locates these anomalous thermal conditions. This device can measure hundreds of thousand of individual temperature points per second and convert this data to thermal maps or temperature images of the concrete. By locating anomalous areas, or temperature patterns which differ from the background “norm” on these images, trained engineers can locate the exact anomalous areas that could lead to catastrophic failure of concrete and its supporting soil and backfill systems.

Ground-penetrating radar gives information valuable in determining such characteristics as: target material, voids, fluids, soil or backfill strata, and quantity of reinforcing steel present.

=== Magnetometer ===
Magnetometers are instruments designed to locate ferrous materials. It can detect iron containing materials to a maximum depth of approximately 10 feet. This is useful for locating dowel pins or determining if reinforcing steel exists.

=== Pachometer ===
This device is designed to specifically locate reinforcing steel in concrete and to assist in the determination of the size of the hidden reinforcing steel.
