= Armor (hydrology) =

Association of surface rocks with stream beds or beaches

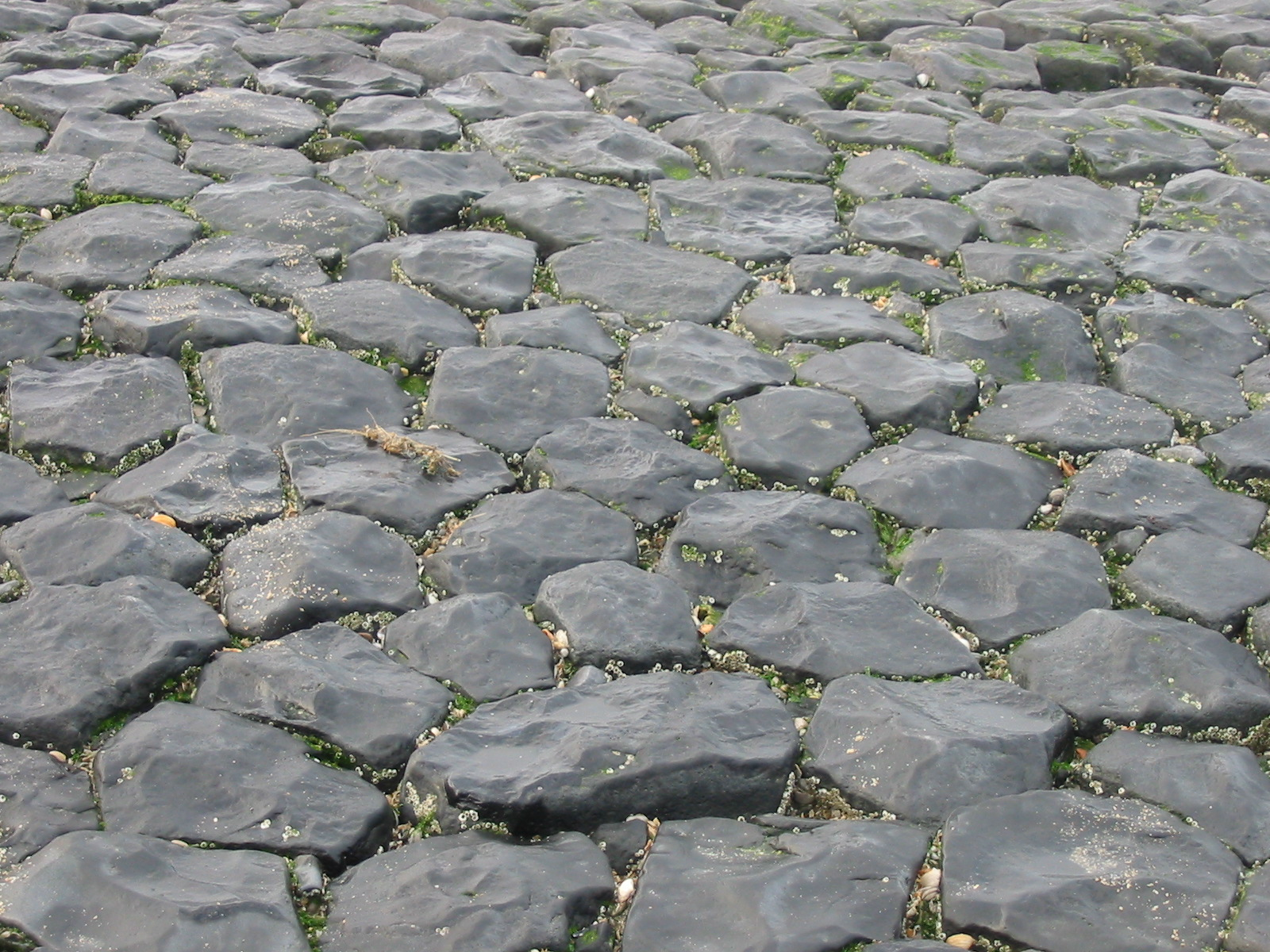
Armour of basalt blocks

In hydrology and geography, armor is the association of surface pebbles, rocks or boulders with stream beds or beaches. Most commonly hydrological armor occurs naturally; however, a man-made form is usually called riprap, when shorelines or stream banks are fortified for erosion protection with large boulders or sizable manufactured concrete objects. When armor is associated with beaches in the form of pebbles to medium-sized stones grading from two to 200 millimeters across, the resulting landform is often termed a shingle beach. Hydrological modeling indicates that stream armor typically persists in a flood stage environment.

== Hjulstroms diagram ==
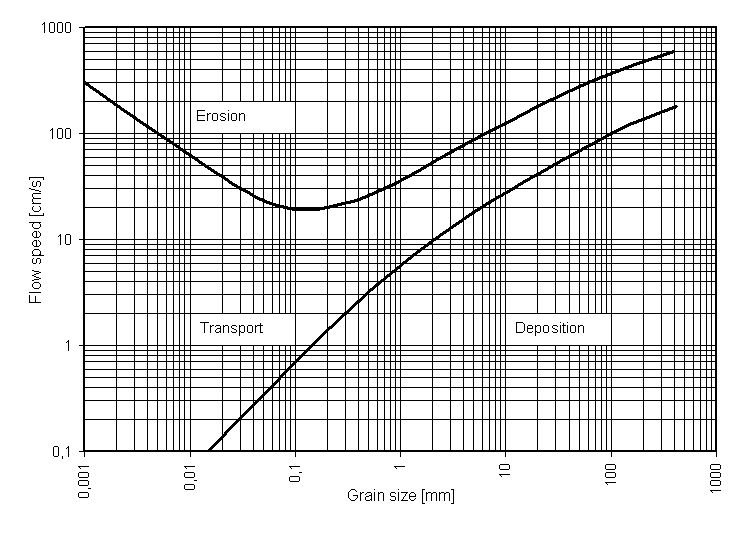
The Hjulstroms diagram

Bed armor is most often transported through entrainment, and more specifically suspension and saltation. Both of these processes involve moving the sediment both near and around the bed of a river. When a sediment is entrained it is being moved downstream through the forces between the layers of water around it, and once it settles it begins to create a layer on the bed of the river. This layer of sediment changes the hydrology of the river around it, as once this layer on the bottom is formed it affects the hydraulics of the river. This layer of sediments on the bed of the river can act as barrier to the incoming flow, and depending on the size and distribution of the grains, can change the river.

The Hjulstroms diagram represents at what grain size and flow speed a particle is transported. The slope present at the top left of its graph is due to clay and silt cohesion.

== Particle size ==
The distribution and size of the sediments can sometimes help indicate the type of river, and the general flow direction. The grain distribution of the bed armor is essential to understanding the armor, and its function that is dependent on the size of the armor. For example, if there is a large piece of sediment that sits on the bed armor layer of the river it can change the threshold for critical flow. The change in critical flow at the bottom of the stream or river can change the turbidity of the flow, and create different types of river systems depending on the range of impact the change in flow has. This effect can create a positive loop, with the critical flow disrupting smaller sediments downstream which repeat the process.

== Stream power ==
Stream power expresses the amount of energy that a river is exerting on its bed. The equation is primarily used to understand the force in terms of the water doing work on the bed. Bed armor is directly involved with this equations, when the force on the stream increases the water acting on the sediments can also increase. This can lead to change and movement within the stream in reference to the sediments on the bottom layer.

== See also ==
- Storm surge – Rise of water associated with a low-pressure weather system
- Bridge scour – Erosion of sediment near bridge foundations by water
