= Offshore Technology Conference =

- Abbreviation: OTC
- Formation: 1969
- Founded at: Houston, Texas, USA
- Website: http://www.otcnet.org/

Offshore Technology Conference (OTC) is a series of conferences and exhibitions, focused on the exchanging technical knowledge relevant to the development of offshore energy resources, primarily oil and natural gas. It was founded in 1969. There are four events organized by OTC. The flagship Offshore Technology Conference is held annually during early May in Houston, Texas, USA since 1969. In 2011, OTC organized OTC Brasil and the Arctic Technology Conference to offer a version of the event focused on the development in the Brasil and Arctic regions. In 2014, OTC Asia was created. OTC Brasil and OTC Asia are held every other year.

OTC is sponsored by 13 industry associations, who work cooperatively to develop the technical program each year. Sponsoring organizations include the American Association of Petroleum Geologists, the American Institute of Chemical Engineers, the American Society of Civil Engineers, the ASME International Petroleum Technology Institute, the Institute of Electrical and Electronics Engineers, the Marine Technology Society, the Society of Exploration Geophysicists, the Society for Mining, Metallurgy, and Exploration, the Society of Naval Architects and Marine Engineers, the Society of Petroleum Engineers, and the Minerals, Metals and Materials Society.

OTC uses proceeds from the events to reinvest into the oil and gas industry through the 13 sponsoring organizations. All technical papers presented at Offshore Technology Conference events are available on OnePetro.org.

== Offshore Technology Conference (OTC Houston) ==
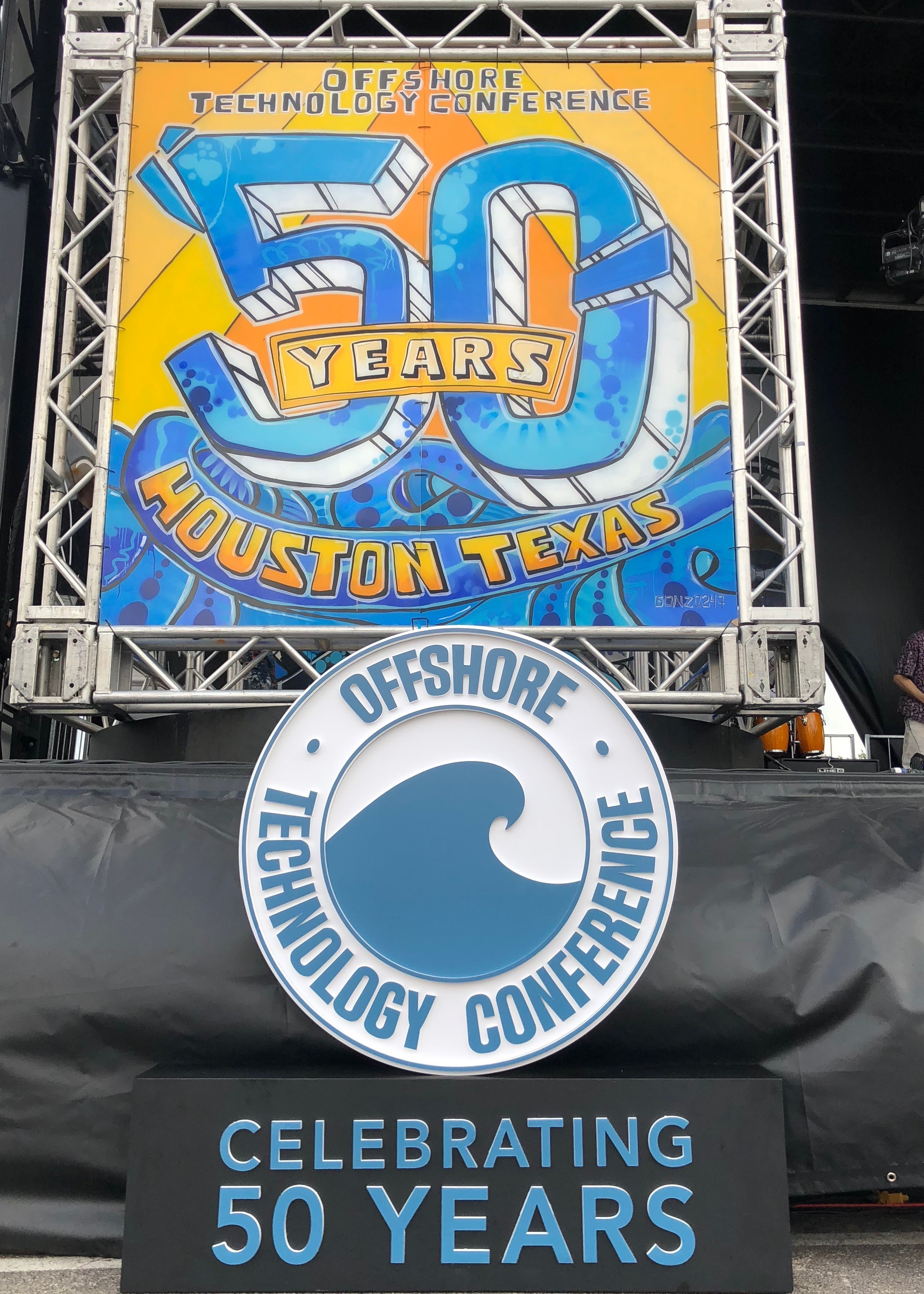
One side of the plexiglass cube painted live at OTC by Houston artist Gonzo247. Below in front of the cube is a custom sign made for the 50th OTC in Houston held in May 2018.

Offshore Technology Conference, the flagship OTC event, is the largest oil and gas sector trade show in the world. The first OTC was held in Houston, Texas in 1969. In 2017, OTC was ranked the 25th event on the Trade Show News Network 2017 Top US Trade Shows List. In 2018, the 50th edition of OTC was held and many outlets reflected on the impact of OTC on Houston and the industry over the years. To celebrate the 50th edition of the event, OTC created a special sign and commissioned Houstonian artist Mario E. Figueroa Jr., also known as GONZO247, to create a one of a kind plexi glasscube painted live at OTC. The 2019 OTC is the 50th anniversary of OTC.

It ranks among the largest 200 tradeshows held annually in the United States and is among the 10 largest meetings in terms of attendance. Attendance consistently exceeds 50,000, and more than 2,000 companies participate in the exhibition. OTC includes attendees from around the globe, with more than 120 countries represented at recent conferences. In 2009, 2,500 companies from 38 countries participated and 66,820 attendance, an 8.5% drop from previous year's 75,092, was reported despite a global economic recession and initial concerns about swine flu. Attendance in 2014 reached a 46-year high of 108,300, the highest in show history and up 3.3% from the previous year.

The cost to attend the Offshore Technology Conference event is generally lower than prices for other oil and gas conferences. In 2018, to attend the full conference as a professional who was a member of one of the 13 sponsoring organizations the registration fee was $180 which included full access to the technical sessions and massive exhibition.

=== Spotlight on New Technology Awards ===
The annual Spotlight on New Technology Awards showcases the latest and most advanced hardware and software technologies that are leading the industry into the future. Technologies are awarded based on the following criteria: new and innovative, proven, broad interest for the industry and significant impact beyond existing technologies.

== OTC Brasil ==
OTC Brasil has been held in 2011, 2013, and 2017. In 2017, OTC Brasil was held in Rio de Janeiro and 150 technical papers were presented in 29 technical sessions.

== OTC Asia ==
OTC Asia was held in 2014, 2016, 2018, 2024 and 2026. The 2018 OTC Asia was held in March in Kuala Lumpur. More than 290 technical papers were presented at OTC Asia in 2018. The event also includes the OTC Asia Spotlight on Technology Awards.

== Arctic Technology Conference ==
The Arctic Technology Conference has been held in 2011, 2012, 2014, 2015, 2016, and will be held in fall 2018. In 2011-2012 and 2014, the conference was held in Houston. The 2015 edition was held in Copenhagen, Denmark. The 2016th edition was held in St. John's, Canada and 135 technical papers were presented. The 2018 edition was held in Houston.

The Arctic Technology Conference is an OTC event that covers the technical challenges that come along with exploration and production of petroleum and natural gas in the arctic. The conference technical program will discuss the logistical and technical aspects involved with recovery oil and gas in the harsh icy arctic environment as well as the environmental and regulatory requirements in the unique arctic environment.
