= Tidal scour =

Sea-floor erosion caused by strong tidal currents

Tidal scour is "sea-floor erosion caused by strong tidal currents resulting in the removal of inshore sediments and formation of deep holes and channels". Examples of this hydrological process can be found globally. Two locations in the United States where tidal scour is the predominant shaping force is the San Francisco Bay and the Elkhorn Slough. Tidal force can also contribute to bridge scour.

== Historical Perspective and Relevance ==
Research on tidal scour is largely centered at Elkhorn Slough in California. The slough was directly exposed to tidal flux beginning in 1947 with the creation of the Moss Landing Harbor. Multiple studies have been done on the slough since tidal exposure to catalog the morphological change and determine how long it will take for the system to reach equilibrium.

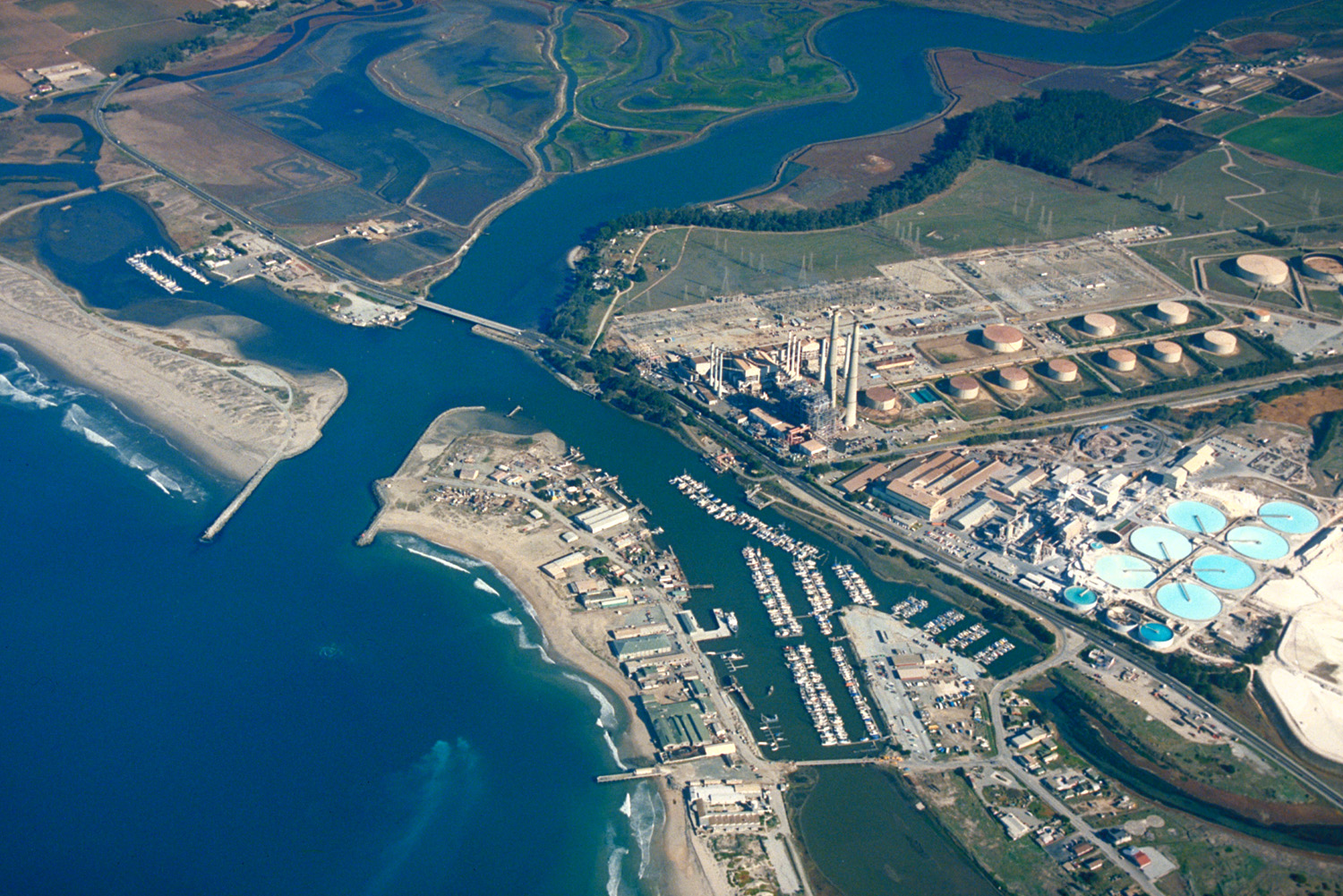
Elkhorn Slough is the focus of many tidal scour studies. Tidal scour became prevalent with the creation of the Moss Landing Harbor seen toward the bottom of the image.

== Formation ==
Tidal scours are formed in tide-dominated deltas and estuaries with the changing of the tide. As the tide changes from low to high or high to low, water is transported through the channel taking sediment with it. With increasing erosion, there is increasing tidal volume creating a self-perpetuating system. Tidal scour is most apparent when a barrier is breached due to natural or anthropogenic forcing.

== Anatomy ==
=== Bathymetry ===
Tidal scour can be determined by looking at the change in bathymetry over time. Bathymetry of tidal channels is determined using multi-beam sonar or LiDAR. By comparing cross-sections of channel bathymetry over several years and at various distances in the tidal channel, the amount of tidal scour can be quantified.

=== Grain Size Distribution ===
Sediment grab samples show that in areas demonstrating tidal scour, there is an increase in grain size from surrounding areas.

== Ecological Significance ==
With direct influence from the Ocean, slough morphology can change significantly making it difficult for native species to persist. This can be seen in:

- Increased transport of agricultural runoff, such as DDT-laden sediment, introduced by increased tidal scour.
- The erosion of marshes and eelgrass beds.
- The loss of benthic organisms as the channels deepen more than organisms can persist.

== See also ==
- Bridge scour – Erosion of sediment near bridge foundations by water
- River delta – Silt deposition landform at the mouth of a river
- Estuary – Partially enclosed coastal body of brackish water
- Sediment transport – Movement of solid particles, typically by gravity and fluid entrainment
