= Bridge scour =

Erosion of sediment near bridge foundations by water

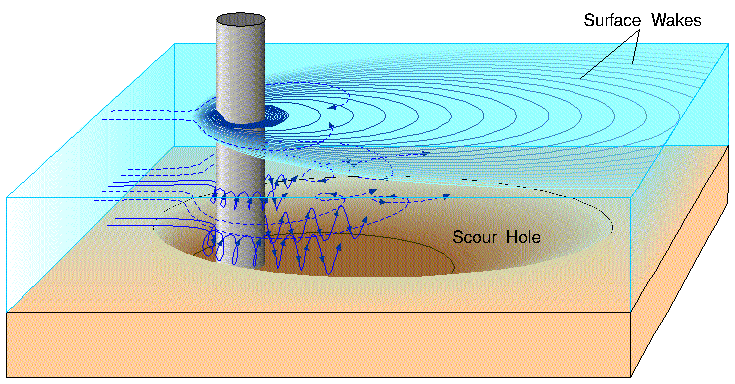
A diagram showing how scour holes are formed past a bridge abutment

Bridge scour is the removal of sediment such as sand and gravel from around bridge abutments or piers. Hydrodynamic scour, caused by fast-flowing water, can carve out scour holes, compromising the integrity of a structure.

In the United States, bridge scour is one of the three main causes of bridge failure (the others being collision and overloading). It has been estimated that 60% of all bridge failures result from scour and other hydraulic-related causes. It is the most common cause of highway bridge failure in the US, where 46 of 86 major bridge failures resulted from scour near piers from 1961 to 1976.

== Areas affected by scour ==
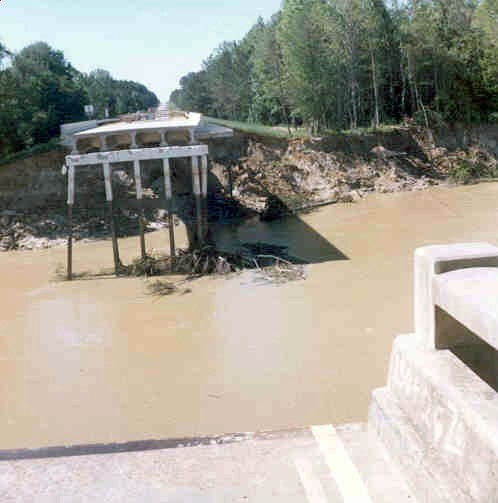
Mississippi Highway 33 bridge over the Homochitto River failed due to flood-induced erosion

Water normally flows faster around piers and abutments making them susceptible to local scour. At bridge openings, contraction scour can occur when water accelerates as it flows through an opening that is narrower than the channel upstream from the bridge. Degradation scour occurs both upstream and downstream from a bridge over large areas. Over long periods of time, this can result in the lowering of the stream bed.

== Causes ==
Stream channel instability resulting in river erosion and changing angles-of-attack can contribute to bridge scour. Debris can also have a substantial impact on bridge scour in several ways. A build-up of material can reduce the size of the waterway under a bridge causing contraction scour in the channel. A build-up of debris on the abutment can increase the obstruction area and increase local scour. Debris can deflect the water flow, changing the angle of attack and increasing local scour. Debris might also shift the entire channel around the bridge causing increased water flow and scour in another location.

The most frequently encountered bridge scour problems usually involve loose alluvial material that can be easily eroded. It should not be assumed that total scour in cohesive or cemented soils will not be as large as in non-cohesive soils; the scour simply takes longer to develop.

Many of the equations for scour were derived from laboratory studies, for which the range of applicability is difficult to ascertain. Most studies focused on piers and pile formations, though most bridge scour problems are related to the more complex configuration of the bridge abutment. Some studies were verified using limited field data, though this is also difficult to accurately scale for physical modelling purposes. During field measurements of post scour, a scour hole that had developed on the rising stage of a flood, or at the peak, may be filled in again on the falling stage. For this reason, the maximum depth of scour cannot be simply modelled after the event.

Scour can also cause problems with the hydraulic analysis of a bridge. Scour may considerably deepen the channel through a bridge and effectively reduce or even eliminate the backwater. This reduction in backwater should not be relied on, however, because of the unpredictable nature of the processes involved.

When considering scour it is normal to distinguish between non-cohesive or cohesionless (alluvial) sediments and cohesive material. The former are usually of most interest to laboratory studies. Cohesive materials require special techniques and are poorly researched.

The first major issue when considering scour is the distinction between clear-water scour and live-bed scour. The critical issue is whether or not the mean bed shear stress of the flow upstream of the bridge is less than or larger than the threshold value needed to move the bed material.

If the upstream shear stress is less than the threshold value, the bed material upstream of the bridge is at rest. This is referred to as the clear-water condition because the approach flow is clear and does not contain sediment. Thus, any bed material that is removed from a local scour hole is not replaced by sediment being transported by the approach flow. The maximum local scour depth is achieved when the size of the scour hole results in a local reduction in shear stress to the critical value such that the flow can no longer remove bed material from the scoured area.

Live-bed scour occurs where the upstream shear stress is greater than the threshold value and the bed material upstream of the crossing is moving. This means that the approach flow continuously transports sediment into a local scour hole. By itself, a live bed in a uniform channel will not cause a scour hole—for this to be created some additional increase in shear stress is needed, such as that caused by a contraction (natural or artificial, such as a bridge) or a local obstruction (e.g. a bridge pier). The equilibrium scour depth is achieved when material is transported into the scour hole at the same rate at which it is transported out.

Typically the maximum equilibrium clear-water scour is about 10% larger than the equilibrium live-bed scour. Conditions that favour clear-water scour include bed material being too coarse to be transported, the presence of vegetated or artificial reinforced channels where velocities are only high enough due to local scour, or flat bed slopes during low flows.

It is possible that both clear-water and live-bed scour can occur. During a flood event, bed shear stress may change as the flood flows change. It is possible to have clear-water conditions at the commencement of a flood event, transitioning to a live bed before reverting to clear-water conditions. Note that the maximum scour depth may occur under initial clear-water conditions, not necessarily when the flood levels peak and live-bed scour is underway. Similarly, relatively high velocities can be experienced when the flow is just contained within the banks, rather than spread over the floodplains at the peak discharge.

Urbanization has the effect of increasing flood magnitudes and causing hydrographs to peak earlier, resulting in higher stream velocities and degradation. Channel improvements or the extraction of gravel (above or below the site in question) can alter water levels, flow velocities, bed slopes and sediment transport characteristics and consequently affect scour. For instance, if an alluvial channel is straightened, widened or altered in any other way that results in an increased flow-energy condition, the channel will tend back towards a lower energy state by degrading upstream, widening and aggrading downstream.

The significance of degradation scour to bridge design is that the engineer has to decide whether the existing channel elevation is likely to be constant over the life of the bridge, or whether it will change. If change is probable then it must be allowed for when designing the waterway and foundations.

The lateral stability of a river channel may also affect scour depths, because movement of the channel may result in the bridge being incorrectly positioned or aligned with respect to the approach flow. This problem can be significant under any circumstances but is potentially very serious in arid or semi-arid regions and with ephemeral (intermittent) streams. Lateral migration rates are largely unpredictable. Sometimes a channel that has been stable for many years may suddenly start to move, but significant influences are floods, bank material, vegetation of the banks and floodplains, and land use.

Scour at bridge sites is typically classified as contraction (or constriction) scour and local scour. Contraction scour occurs over a whole cross-section as a result of the increased velocities and bed shear stresses arising from a narrowing of the channel by a construction such as a bridge. In general, the smaller the opening ratio the larger the waterway velocity and the greater the potential for scour. If the flow contracts from a wide floodplain, considerable scour and bank failure can occur. Relatively severe constrictions may require regular maintenance for decades to combat erosion. It is evident that one way to reduce contraction scour is to make the opening wider.

Local scour arises from the increased velocities and associated vortices as water accelerates around the corners of abutments, piers and spur dykes.

=== Flow pattern around a cylindrical pier ===
The approaching flow decelerates as it nears the cylinder, coming to rest at the centre of the pier. The resulting stagnation pressure is highest near the water surface where the approach velocity is greatest, and smaller lower down. The downward pressure gradient at the pier face directs the flow downwards. Local pier scour begins when the downflow velocity near the stagnation point is strong enough to overcome the resistance to motion of the bed particles.

During flooding, although the foundations of a bridge might not suffer damage, the fill behind abutments may scour. This type of damage typically occurs with single-span bridges with vertical wall abutments.

== Bridge examination and scour evaluation ==
The examination process is normally conducted by hydrologists and hydrologic technicians, and involves a review of historical engineering information about the bridge, followed by a visual inspection. Information is recorded about the type of rock or sediment carried by the river, and the angle at which the river flows toward and away from the bridge. The area under the bridge is also inspected for holes and other evidence of scour.

Bridge examination begins by office investigation. The history of the bridge and any previous scour related problems should be noted. Once a bridge is recognized as a potential scour bridge, it will proceed to further evaluation including field review, scour vulnerability analysis and prioritizing. Bridges will also be rated in different categories and prioritized for scour risk. Once a bridge is evaluated as scour critical, the bridge owner should prepare a scour plan of action to mitigate the known and potential deficiencies. The plan may include installation of countermeasures, monitoring, inspections after flood events, and procedures for closing bridges if necessary.

Alternatively, sensing technologies are also being put in place for scour assessment. The scour-sensing level can be classified into three levels: general bridge inspection, collecting limited data and collecting detailed data. There are three different types of scour-monitoring systems: fixed, portable and geophysical positioning. Each system can help to detect scour damage in an effort to avoid bridge failure, thus increasing public safety.

== Countermeasures and prevention ==
The Hydraulic Engineering Circular Manual No. 23 (HEC-23) contains general design guidelines as scour countermeasures that are applicable to piers and abutments. The numbering in the following table indicates the HEC-23 design guideline section:

Description of countermeasure types in HEC-23
| Description | Design guideline no. |
|---|---|
| Bend way weirs and stream barbs | 1 |
| Soil cement | 2 |
| Wire-enclosed riprap mattress | 3 |
| Articulated concrete block system | 4 |
| Grout-filled mattresses | 5 |
| Concrete armour units | 6 |
| Grout- or cement-filled bags | 7 |
| Rock riprap at piers and abutments | 8 |
| Spurs | 9 |
| Guide banks | 10 |
| Check dams and drop structures | 11 |
| Revetments | 12 |

Bend way weirs, spurs and guide banks can help to align the upstream flow while riprap, gabions, articulated concrete blocks and grout-filled mattresses can mechanically stabilize the pier and abutment slopes. Riprap remains the most common countermeasure used to prevent scour at bridge abutments. A number of physical additions to the abutments of bridges can help prevent scour, such as the installation of gabions and stone pitching upstream from the foundation. The addition of sheet piles or interlocking prefabricated concrete blocks can also offer protection. These countermeasures do not change the scouring flow and are temporary since the components are known to move or be washed away in a flood. The Federal Highway Administration (FHWA) recommends design criteria in HEC-18 and 23, such as avoiding unfavourable flow patterns, streamlining the abutments, and designing pier foundations resistant to scour without depending upon the use of riprap or other countermeasures.

Trapezoidal-shaped channels through a bridge can significantly decrease local scour depths compared to vertical wall abutments, as they provide a smoother transition through a bridge opening. This eliminates abrupt corners that cause turbulent areas. Spur dykes, barbs, groynes, and vanes are river training structures that change stream hydraulics to mitigate undesirable erosion or deposits. They are usually used on unstable stream channels to help redirect stream flow to more desirable locations through the bridge. The insertion of piles or deeper footings is also used to help strengthen bridges.

== Estimating scour depth ==
Hydraulic Engineering Circular Manual No. 18 (HEC-18) was published by the FHWA, and includes several techniques of estimating scour depth. The empirical scour equations for live-bed scour, clear-water scour, and local scour at piers and abutments are shown in the Chapter 5 – General Scour section. The total scour depth is determined by adding three scour components which includes the long-term aggradation and degradation of the river bed, general scour at the bridge and local scour at the piers or abutment. However, research has shown that the standard equations in HEC-18 over-predict scour depth for a number of hydraulic and geologic conditions. Most of the HEC-18 relationships are based on laboratory flume studies conducted with sand-sized sediments increased with factors of safety that are not easily recognizable or adjustable. Sand and fine gravel are the most easily eroded bed materials, but streams frequently contain much more scour resistant materials such as compact till, stiff clay, and shale. The consequences of using design methods based on a single soil type are especially significant for many major physiographic provinces with distinctly different geologic conditions and foundation materials. This can lead to overly conservative design values for scour in low risk or non-critical hydrologic conditions. Thus, equation improvements are continued to be made in an effort to minimize the underestimation and overestimation of scour.

== Bridge disasters caused by scour ==
- Custer Creek train wreck
- Glanrhyd Bridge collapse
- Hintze Ribeiro Bridge collapse
- Schoharie Creek Bridge collapse

== See also ==
- List of bridge failures
- Armor (hydrology)
- Baer–Babinet law
- Breakwater (structure)
- Bridge maintenance
- Fluid dynamics
- Homochitto River
- Kármán vortex street
- MIKE 21C
